= Wellstone =

Wellstone is a surname. Notable people with the surname include:

- Paul Wellstone (1944–2002), American politician
- Sheila Wellstone (1944–2002), wife of Paul

== See also ==
- The Wellstone, novel
- Wellstone Action, non-profit organization
