= 2008 United States Senate election in Minnesota =

- November 4, 2008
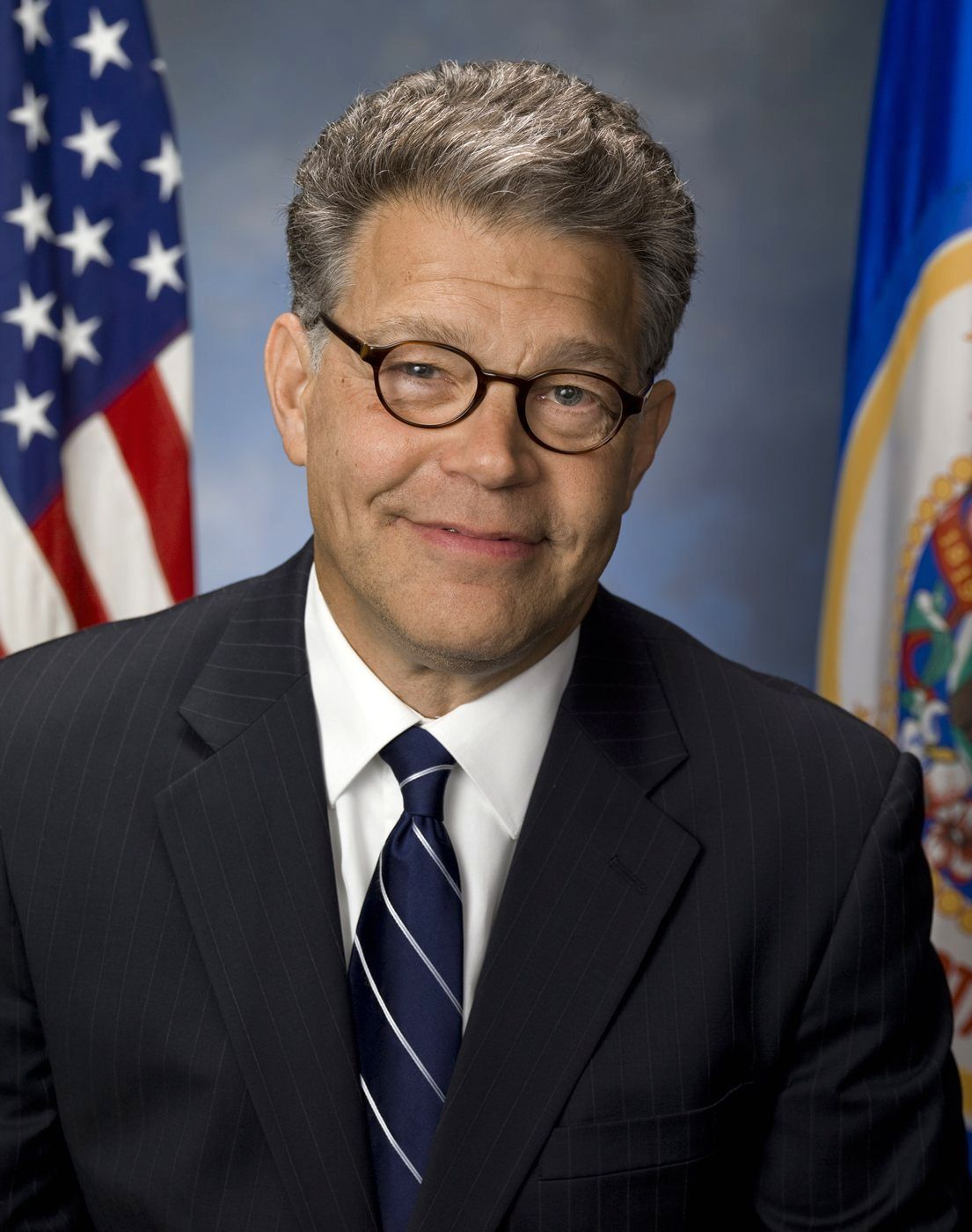

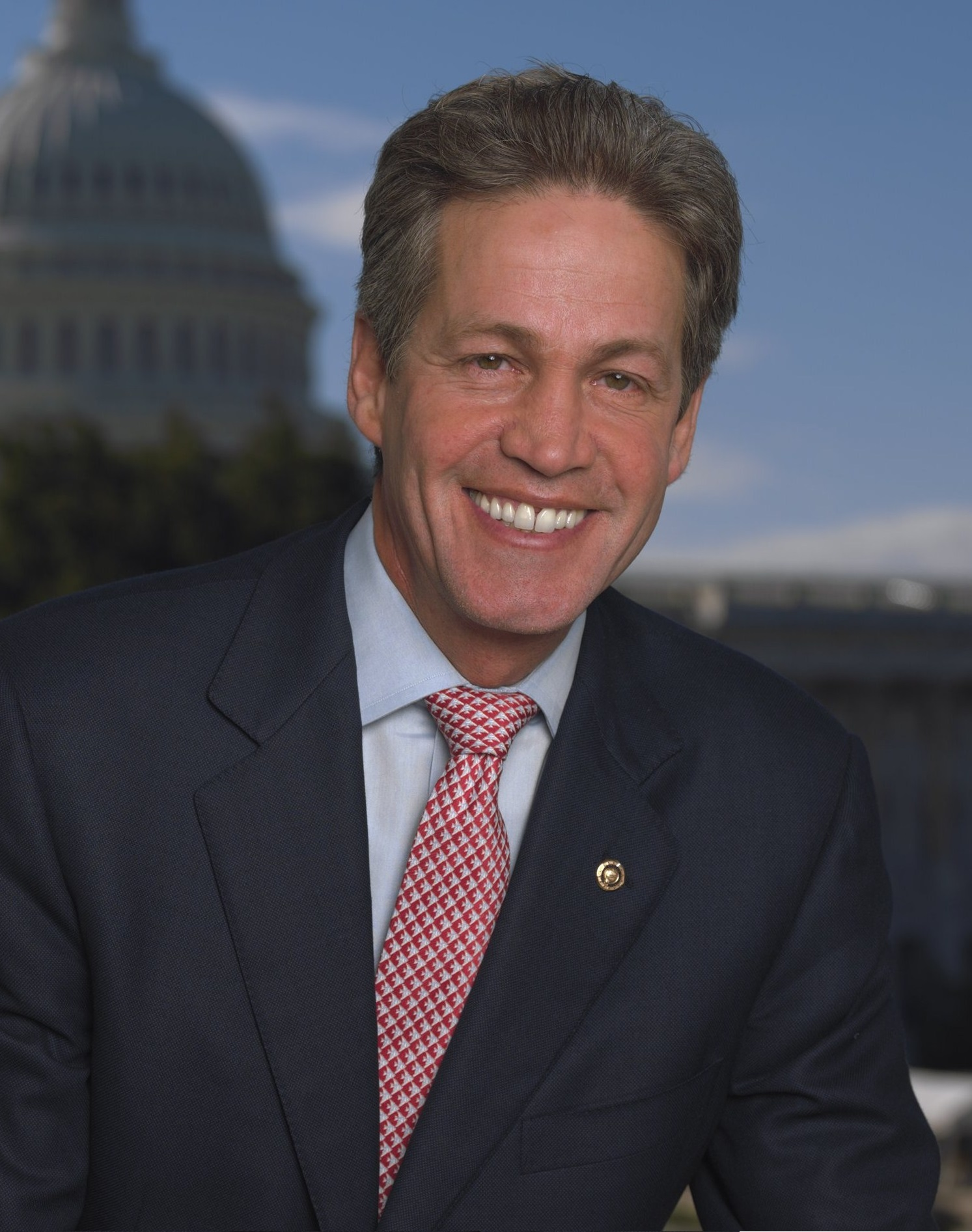

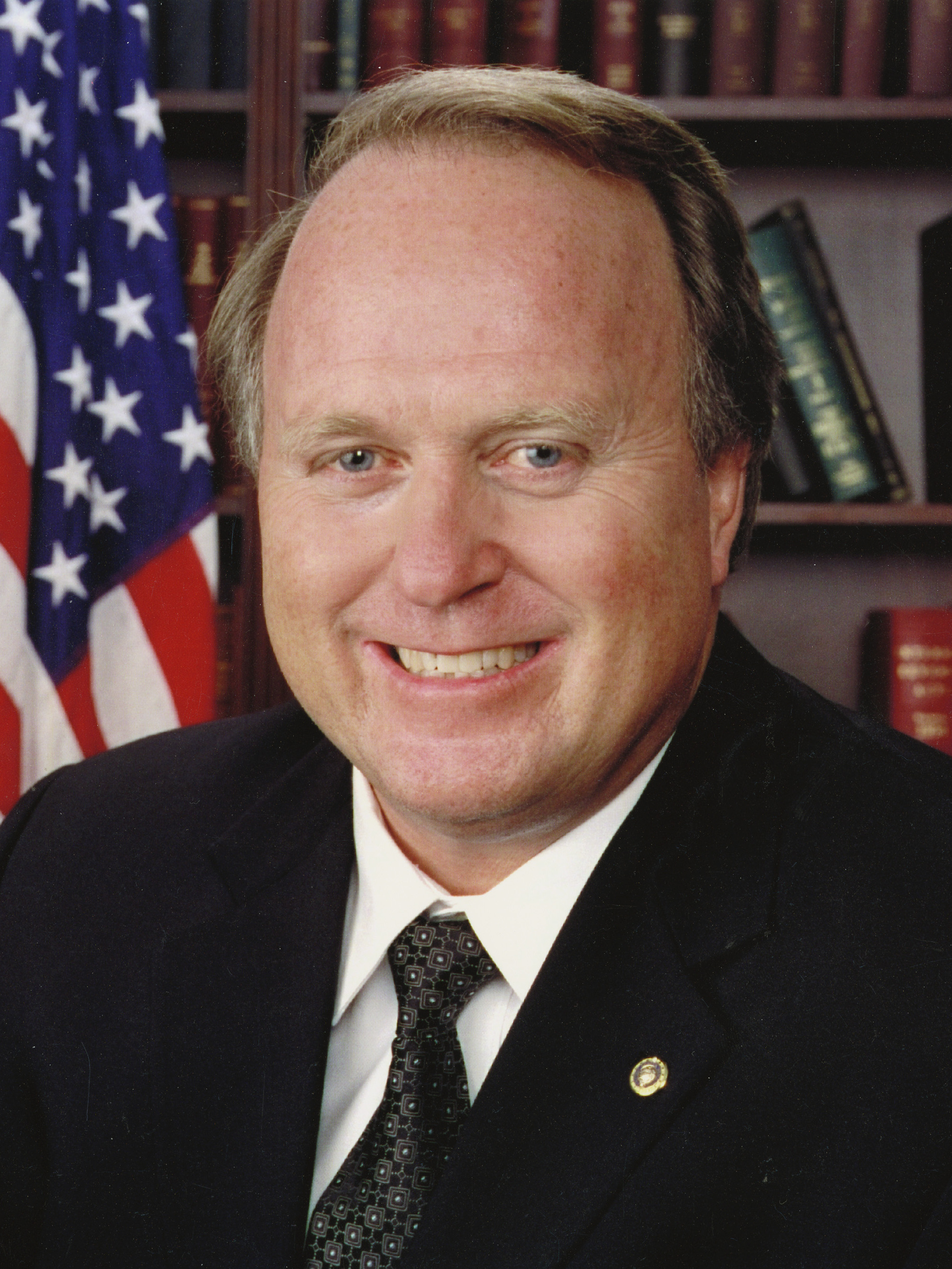
Nominee	Al Franken	Norm Coleman	Dean Barkley
Party	Democratic (DFL)	Republican	Independence
Popular vote	1,212,629	1,212,317	437,505
Percentage	41.99%	41.98%	15.15%
- Franken: 30–40% 40–50% 50–60% 60–70% 70–80% 80–90% >90% Coleman: 30–40% 40–50% 50–60% 60–70% 70–80% 80–90% >90% Barkley: 30–40% 40–50% 50–60% 60–70% Tie: 30–40% 40–50% 50% No votes
U.S. senator before election
Norm Coleman
Republican
Elected U.S. Senator
Al Franken
Democratic (DFL)

The 2008 United States Senate election in Minnesota took place on November 4, 2008. After a legal battle lasting over eight months, the Democratic–Farmer–Labor Party (DFL) candidate, Al Franken, defeated Republican incumbent Norm Coleman in one of the closest elections in the history of the Senate, with Coleman's Senate predecessor Dean Barkley taking third place. Franken took his oath of office on July 7, 2009, more than half a year after the end of Coleman's term on January 3, 2009.

When the initial count was completed on November 18, Franken was trailing Coleman by 215 votes. The close margin triggered a mandatory recount. After reviewing ballots that had been challenged during the recount and counting 953 wrongly rejected absentee ballots, the State Canvassing Board officially certified the recount results with Franken holding a 225-vote lead.

On January 6, 2009, Coleman's campaign filed an election contest and on April 13, a three-judge panel dismissed Coleman's Notice of Contest and ruled that Franken had won the election by 312 votes. Coleman's appeal of the panel's decision to the Minnesota Supreme Court was unanimously rejected on June 30, and he subsequently conceded the election. Franken was sworn in as the junior senator from Minnesota on July 7. With a margin of just 0.01%, this election was the closest race of the 2008 Senate election cycle.

== Primaries ==
In Minnesota, candidates are generally endorsed by their political parties before the party primaries. The Republican Party endorsed Norm Coleman, and the DFL Party Al Franken. In total 18 candidates had filed to run in the statewide primaries, including seven for the DFL Party, two for the Republican Party, seven for the Independence Party, one for the Libertarian Party, and one for the Constitution Party.

Notable challengers included former Ventura administration official Jack Uldrich and former Senator Dean Barkley for the IP nomination; lawyer and vocal Franken critic Priscilla Lord Faris for the DFL nomination; and dentist and fugitive Jack Shepard for the Republican nomination. Minneapolis attorney Mike Ciresi also campaigned for the DFL endorsement, but dropped out on March 10. Each party's respective primary was held on September 9, resulting in Barkley, Franken and Coleman on the general election ballot.

=== DFL ===
Democratic–Farmer–Labor primary results
Party	Candidate	Votes	%
Democratic (DFL)	Al Franken	164,136	65.34%
Democratic (DFL)	Priscilla Lord Faris	74,655	29.72%
Democratic (DFL)	Dick Franson	3,923	1.56%
Democratic (DFL)	Bob Larson	3,152	1.25%
Democratic (DFL)	Rob Fitzgerald	3,095	1.23%
Democratic (DFL)	Ole Savior	1,227	0.49%
Democratic (DFL)	Alve Erickson	1,017	0.40%
Total votes		251,205	100.00%

The following candidates sought an endorsement at the party's convention, but dropped out after Franken was endorsed: Mike Ciresi, Jim Cohen and Jack Nelson-Pallmeyer.

=== Independence ===
Independence primary results
Party	Candidate	Votes	%
Independence	Dean Barkley	6,678	58.88%
Independence	Jack Uldrich	1,405	12.39%
Independence	Stephen Williams	800	7.05%
Independence	Kurt Michael Anderson	761	6.71%
Independence	Doug Williams	639	5.63%
Independence	Darryl Stanton	618	5.45%
Independence	Bill Dahn	440	3.88%
Total votes		11,341	100.00%

Though Stephen Williams was endorsed by the Independence Party, he lost to former Senator Dean Barkley by over 51 points and was third place in the primary behind Jack Uldrich.

=== Republican ===
Republican primary results
Party	Candidate	Votes	%
Republican	Norm Coleman (incumbent)	130,973	91.32%
Republican	Jack Shepard	12,456	8.68%
Total votes		143,429	100.00%

== General election ==
=== Candidates ===
The general election was among candidates nominated by three major parties, the Minnesota Democratic–Farmer–Labor Party (DFL), the Republican Party of Minnesota (R), and the Independence Party of Minnesota, as well as two other parties, the Libertarian Party (L) and the Constitution Party (C). The Green Party failed to nominate a candidate.

- Charles Aldrich (L)
- Dean Barkley (IP), former U.S. senator and co-founder of the Minnesota Independence Party
- Norm Coleman (R), incumbent U.S. Senator and former mayor of St. Paul
- Al Franken (DFL), former Air America radio talk-show host, writer, comedian, and political commentator
- James Niemackl (C)

=== Fundraising ===
2007 year-end reports filed with the Federal Election Commission showed that Franken had raised $7.04 million through December 31, 2007, while Coleman had raised $6.24 million. Year-end cash on hand was $6.04 million for Coleman and $3.10 million for Franken.

Pre-primary reports filed with the FEC on August 20 showed Coleman as having raised $16.76 million (with $5.61 million on hand), Franken $13.09 million (with $2.37 million on hand), and Barkley $14,374 (with $5,071 on hand).

A late October Star Tribune report showed Barkley as having raised $56,763.

=== Predictions ===
Source	Ranking	As of
The Cook Political Report	Tossup	October 23, 2008
CQ Politics	Tossup	October 31, 2008
Rothenberg Political Report	Tossup	November 2, 2008
Real Clear Politics	Tossup	November 1, 2008

=== Polling ===
Opinion polls show Franken narrowing Coleman's lead after the primaries.

Early polling showed Coleman with a large lead over his prospective Democratic opponents. But the race narrowed considerably, becoming one of the most hotly contested elections in the nation in 2008. A January 29, 2008 poll from Minnesota Public Radio showed the first lead for Franken. Barkley consistently polled in the 15–20% range and was unable to break past 20%.

Poll source	Date(s) administered	Norm Coleman (R)	Al Franken (DFL)	Dean Barkley (IP)
Survey USA	November 1, 2008	44%	39%	16%
Star Tribune	October 29–31, 2008	38%	42%	15%
Rasmussen Reports	October 28, 2008	43%	39%	14%
Rasmussen Reports	October 22, 2008	37%	41%	17%
University of Wisconsin–Madison	October 19–22, 2008	34%	40%	15%
St. Cloud State University	October 14–22, 2008	36%	27%	16%
Minneapolis Star Tribune	October 21, 2008	36%	39%	18%
Survey USA	October 8–18, 2008	41%	39%	18%
Quinnipiac University	October 8–12, 2008	36%	38%	18%
Rasmussen Reports	October 7, 2008	37%	43%	17%
Minneapolis Star Tribune	September 30 – October 2, 2008	34%	43%	18%
SurveyUSA	September 30 – October 1, 2008	43%	33%	19%
Quinnipiac	September 14–21, 2008	49%	42%	
Rasmussen Reports	September 18, 2008	48%	47%	3%
Minneapolis Star-Tribune	September 10–12, 2008	41%	37%	13%
Survey USA	September 12, 2008	41%	40%	14%
Survey USA	August 18, 2008	46%	39%	
Minnesota Public Radio	August 17, 2008	40%	41%	
Rasmussen Reports	August 13, 2008	49%	46%	
Quinnipiac	July 24, 2008	53%	38%	
Rasmussen Reports	July 22, 2008	46%	49%	
Rasmussen Reports	July 10, 2008	42%	44%	
KSTP**	June 13, 2008	48%	37%	8%
Rasmussen Reports	June 9, 2008	48%	45%	
Quinnipiac	June 26, 2008	51%	41%	
Survey USA	June 10–12, 2008	52%	40%	
Rasmussen Reports	June 11, 2008	48%	45%	
Rasmussen Reports	May 22, 2008	47%	45%	
Minneapolis Star-Tribune	May 12–15, 2008	51%	44%	
Survey USA	April 30 – May 1, 2008	52%	42%	
Rasmussen Reports	April 22, 2008	50%	43%	
Rasmussen Reports	March 19, 2008	48%	46%	
Survey USA	March 12, 2008	51%	41%	
McLaughlin & Associates	March 6–9, 2008	46%	40%	
Minnesota Public Radio/Humphrey Institute	January 20–27, 2008	40%	43%	
Minnesota Public Radio/Mason Dixon	May 7–9, 2007	54%	32%	

=== Results ===
After all the votes were tallied, Coleman led Franken by 215 votes—well under the 0.5% margin that triggers a mandatory recount according to state law.

Early on November 5, news organizations including the Associated Press, Minnesota Public Radio, and Fox News called the election for Coleman. NPR and the AP uncalled the race mere hours later. Coleman declared himself the victor, and suggested that Franken waive his right to a recount. Franken was unwilling to do so.

Since the unofficial results were first posted on the Minnesota Secretary of State's website, Coleman's lead had narrowed from 726 votes on November 5 to the official pre-recount tally of 215 votes on November 18. Secretary of State Mark Ritchie called these changes "well within the normal range in the days immediately following an election, when county officials double check and verify election night tabulations reported to the secretary of state's office", while Coleman's campaign decried the "improbable shifts that are overwhelmingly accruing to the benefit of Al Franken." An independent analysis of statewide elections over the previous 10 years showed that the average change in vote totals as reported on election night compared to the certified result was 1,500 votes. The results were certified by each county's canvassing board and then on November 18, 2008, by the Minnesota State Canvassing Board.

2008 United States Senate election in Minnesota: Results certified November 18, 2008
Party	Candidate	Votes	%	±%
Republican	Norm Coleman (incumbent)	1,211,590	41.988%	−7.541%
Democratic (DFL)	Al Franken	1,211,375	41.981%	−5.355%
Independence	Dean Barkley	437,404	15.19%	+13.16%
Libertarian	Charles Aldrich	13,916	0.48%	n/a
Constitution	James Niemackl	8,905	0.31%	+0.21%
Write-in		2,365	0.08%	
Plurality		215	0.007%	
Turnout		2,885,555		

Note: The ±% column reflects the change in total number of votes won by each party from the previous election. Additionally, votes cast for Paul Wellstone in the 2002 election are not factored into the DFL's total from that year.

== Recount ==
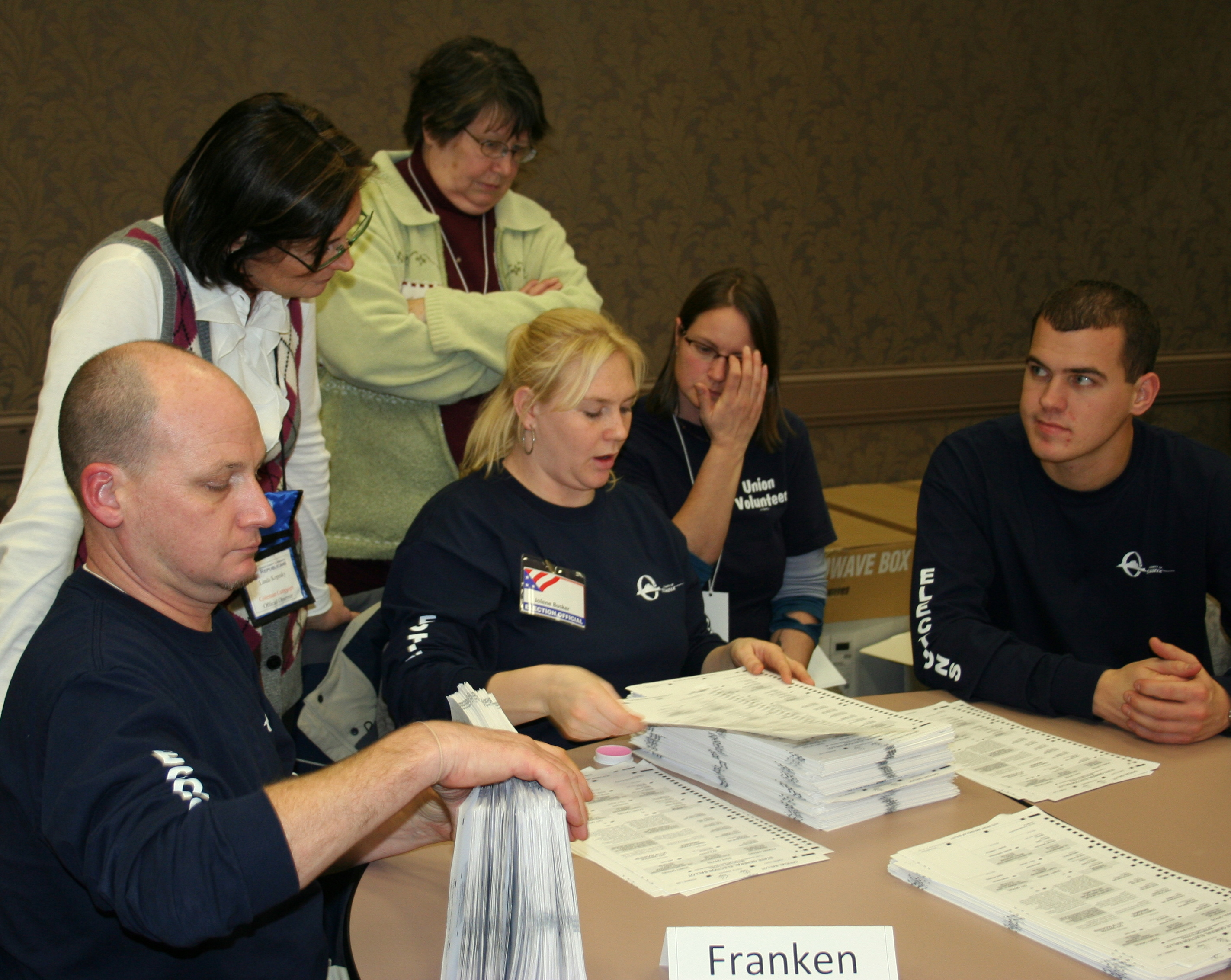
Recounting ballots by hand in Olmsted County

In accordance with state law, the Minnesota State Canvassing Board ordered a hand recount. Representatives of Coleman and Franken observed the sorting and recounting of the ballots at 120 locations across the state on November 19, and largely finished on December 5. The votes were counted locally, but ballots that were challenged by either campaign were sent to the state capital for consideration by the State Canvassing Board. The board was a five-person panel consisting of Secretary of State Mark Ritchie, Minnesota Supreme Court Chief Justice Eric Magnuson, Justice G. Barry Anderson, Ramsey County District Court Chief Judge Kathleen Gearin, and Assistant Chief Judge Edward Cleary; they made determinations of voter intent for ballots where either of the campaign's representatives disagreed with the election officials at the county sites. Of the five Canvassing Board members, Ritchie was an elected DFLer, the two justices were appointed by a Republican governor, one judge was appointed by an Independence Party governor, and one was elected in a nonpartisan election.

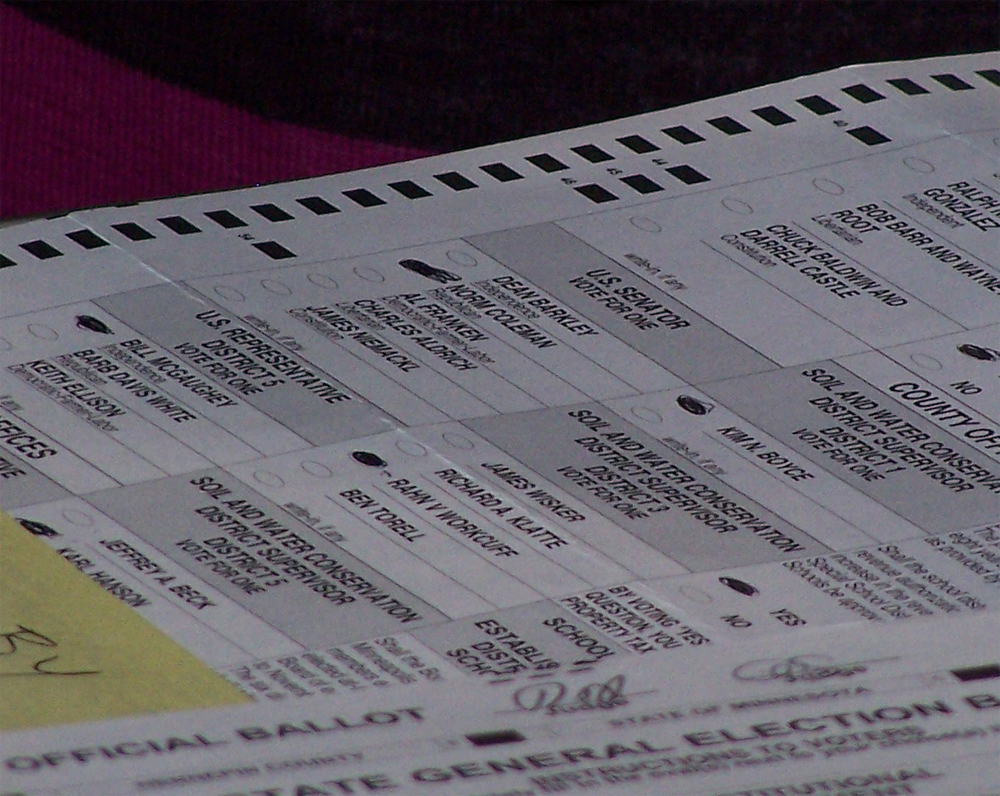
Hennepin County ballot paper

Of Minnesota's 4,130 precincts, one had to delay reporting its totals because election officials deduced that 133 ballots, all in a single envelope, had gone missing during the recount process. After days of searching, the State Canvassing Board decided to use that precinct's election day totals, which included the missing 133 votes. The 133 missing ballots contributed a net 46 votes for Franken.

By the end of the recount, each candidate had gained votes. In total, Coleman had challenged 3,377 ballots and Franken had challenged 3,278. These ballots were set aside until the State Canvassing Board could meet on December 16 to decide the fate of challenged ballots. But Ritchie's office insisted that each campaign voluntarily withdraw some of its challenges, due to the strain a large pile of ballot challenges would place on the State Canvassing Board. On December 3, Franken's campaign withdrew 633 of its challenges and said that it would withdraw more at a later date. The next day, Coleman's campaign responded by withdrawing 650 challenges. By the time all the ballots that Franken's campaign challenged were examined, only 420 challenges were left that had not been withdrawn, while Coleman's campaign had roughly 1,000. The Secretary of State's website had noted that none of the withdrawn ballot challenges were reflected in the running tally of the recount.

By December 19, the State Canvassing Board had largely concluded its review of the campaigns' ballot challenges. Of the 1,325 ballots that were reviewed, 319 were awarded to Coleman, 758 to Franken, and 248 were labeled "other". According to the AP, MPR, and the Star Tribune, the resolution of these challenges marked the first time Franken took a lead in the recount. On December 30, the board finished reallocating the withdrawn challenges, completing that phase of the recount and leaving Franken with a 49-vote lead.

One of the last—and largest—sources of uncertainty was the absentee ballots that election officials had improperly rejected during the original count. Franken's campaign asked for those ballots to be tallied by each county and counted in the recount results, while Coleman's campaign said the canvassing board did not have the authority to deal with the ballots. On December 8, some counties began sorting rejected absentee ballots to find out how many were incorrectly rejected. On December 12, the Board voted unanimously to recommend counties sort through their rejected absentee ballots, setting aside any that were incorrectly rejected and resubmitting their vote totals with the incorrectly rejected ballots included. The Coleman campaign filed suit with the state Supreme Court to temporarily halt such counting until "a standard procedure" could be determined, but the State Supreme Court ruled on December 18 that the improperly rejected absentee ballots be included in the recount. The Court also prescribed that a standard procedure be established by the Secretary of State's office in conjunction with the two campaigns.

As of December 30, county officials had found about 1,350 wrongly rejected ballots. The Franken campaign agreed to count all those ballots, while the Coleman campaign agreed to a subset and wanted to reconsider more than 700 other absentee ballots. On December 30 and 31, representatives of both campaigns met with officials in each county and sorted through the absentee ballots. After some were rejected by one campaign or the other, 953 ballots were sent to the secretary of state's office. The "fifth pile" of wrongly rejected absentee ballots was opened, checked for identifying marks, and counted (where found eligible) on January 3, 2009. Of the 933 ballots found to be eligible, 481 were for Franken; 305 were for Coleman; and 147 were for other candidates or were overvotes or undervotes. The process was broadcast live online.

The state canvassing board certified the recounted vote totals on January 5 with Franken ahead by 225 votes. Former Minnesota Governor Arne Carlson, a Republican who did not endorse a candidate in the 2008 Senate race, called for Coleman to concede.

2008 United States Senate election in Minnesota: Results certified January 5, 2009
Party	Candidate	Votes	%	±%
Democratic (DFL)	Al Franken	1,212,431	41.991%	−5.35%
Republican	Norm Coleman (incumbent)	1,212,206	41.984%	−7.55%
Independence	Dean Barkley	437,505	15.15%	+13.15%
Libertarian	Charles Aldrich	13,923	0.48%	n/a
Constitution	James Niemackl	8,907	0.31%	+0.21%
Write-in		2,365	0.08%	
Plurality		225	0.007%	
Turnout		2,887,337 †		

Note: The ±% column reflects the change in total number of votes won by each party from the previous election. Additionally, votes cast for Paul Wellstone in the 2002 election are not factored into the DFL's total from that year.

=== Election certificate ===
After the Canvassing Board finished the recount, the next step was for the state to issue an official certificate of election. State law requires a seven-day delay from the Canvassing Board's final report until the certificate can be issued and signed by Ritchie and Minnesota Governor Tim Pawlenty. Furthermore, state law states that a certificate cannot be issued if an election contest is pending.

On January 12, 2009, Franken sent Ritchie and Pawlenty letters requesting an election certificate. Both declined, citing Coleman's unresolved election contest. Later that day, Franken sued in federal court to force the state to issue a certificate, claiming that federal law relating to Senate elections superseded state law. The next day his campaign asked the Minnesota Supreme Court to require Pawlenty and Ritchie to issue the certificate, and the court held a hearing on the suit on February 5.

Texas Senator John Cornyn said that GOP senators were prepared to filibuster the seating of the canvassing board's declared winner until a signed election certificate was available, as provided under Minnesota law. On January 21, 2009, the day after the inauguration of President Barack Obama, Senate Majority Leader Harry Reid said that Senate Democrats were "going to try to seat Al Franken" at least provisionally until the challenge was resolved. Reid also said that there was "not a question in anyone's mind...that there's been any fraud or wrongdoing in this election." Senate Republican leaders countered this by insisting that Franken respect Minnesota law and allow the completion of the legal review.

=== Election contest ===
Coleman filed a contest of the election results in the Ramsey County District Court on January 6, 2009. In it, he alleged ballot counting irregularities that, if corrected, would result in his winning the election. Among other issues, he alleged that there were double-counted duplicate ballots, 654 valid absentee votes rejected as invalid by county election officials, and problems in dealing with the lost ballots in a Minneapolis precinct.

Under Minnesota law the chief justice of the state Supreme Court appoints a three-judge panel to hear an election contest. Because Chief Justice Magnuson had served on the state canvassing board, he recused himself, passing the task to Alan Page, the senior justice on the court. Page chose Judge Elizabeth A. Hayden of Stearns County (who was first appointed by DFL governor Rudy Perpich) to preside over the contest. Assistant Chief Judge Kurt J. Marben of Pennington County (appointed by Independence Party governor Jesse Ventura) and Assistant Chief Judge Denise D. Reilly of Hennepin County (appointed by Republican governor Arne Carlson) were also appointed.

On January 12, Franken filed a motion to dismiss Coleman's contest, claiming it was "an imprecise and scattershot pleading". He argued that even if the contest were to proceed, the three-judge panel should be limited to determining who would be awarded the already certified ballots and to a simple, mathematical recount to ensure the accuracy of the canvassing board's count, with no additional ballots reviewed. On January 22, Franken's attorneys also argued that the case should not go to trial because the U.S. Senate, not the court system, has the power under the United States Constitution to judge the election of its members. Franken's motion to dismiss was denied by the panel on January 23.

On January 19, Coleman attorney Fritz Knaak requested that the court open and review all rejected absentee ballots—totaling roughly 12,000—because some of them, he contended, were improperly rejected. Coleman's attorneys also proposed a multiple-phase trial that would not start until February 2, in which the first phase would focus on rejected absentee ballots. The panel denied these requests on January 23.

The trial began on January 26. Coleman's legal team ran into trouble on the first day when the judges refused to enter into evidence copies of the envelopes from allegedly wrongly rejected absentee ballots. Coleman's team had made markings on some of their copies of the envelopes, so the panel ruled that Coleman's attorney would need to subpoena the original envelopes from the counties.

On February 3 the judges agreed to consider 4,797 rejected absentee ballots. This was fewer than the number requested by Coleman but more than Franken requested. These ballots fell into two categories: those where voters appeared to have met all legal requirements, and those where voters ran afoul of the law through no fault of their own.

On February 13 the court ruled that no evidence had been presented to establish widespread problems with the counting of absentee ballots and that rejected absentee ballots from 12 of 19 disputed categories would not be counted. According to Coleman's attorney, this left approximately 3,500 ballots still open for consideration. The order also specified that parties must demonstrate that disputed ballots were legally cast, not just that they should not have been rejected, making it more difficult to argue in favor of counting remaining absentee ballots.

On March 2, the Coleman team rested its case after five weeks of testimony. The contest resumed on March 3 with the Franken team presenting its counterarguments. On March 13, the trial portion of the contest concluded with closing arguments from both sides. Franken's closing was delivered by attorney Kevin Hamilton and Coleman's by Joseph Friedburg. After closing arguments, Franken lead attorney Marc Elias said: "After seven weeks of trial, hundreds of witnesses, and thousands of exhibits, the trial demonstrated what the state canvassing board found to be true after an exhaustive recount: that Al Franken got more votes on Election Day than Norm Coleman. We remain confident that the court will uphold the results of the election and allow Al Franken to begin the work the voters of Minnesota hired him to do."

On March 31, the court issued an order to count at most 400 rejected absentee ballots and denied any other relief. On April 7, the court scrutinized those ballots and determined that 351 had been legally cast. Those votes were counted, with 111 going to Coleman, 198 to Franken, and 42 to others, giving Franken a final margin of 312 votes.

The court dismissed Coleman's suit "with prejudice" in its final ruling on April 13, finding that his claims had no merit and ordering the Coleman camp to pay the legal costs associated with Coleman's failure to disclose information about Pamela Howell, a precinct election judge and witness in the case, which was later determined to amount to $94,783. In the same ruling, the court rejected Coleman's requests to exclude 132 missing ballots from the recount total and to adjust the results based on Coleman's allegations of double-counted ballots.

2008 United States Senate election in Minnesota: Certified results after election contest
Party	Candidate	Votes	%	±%
Democratic (DFL)	Al Franken	1,212,629	41.994%	−5.35%
Republican	Norm Coleman (incumbent)	1,212,317	41.983%	−7.55%
Independence	Dean Barkley	437,505	15.151%	+13.15%
Libertarian	Charles Aldrich	13,923	0.48%	n/a
Constitution	James Niemackl	8,907	0.31%	+0.21%
Write-in		2,365	0.08%	
Plurality		312	0.011%	
Turnout		2,887,646		
Democratic (DFL) gain from Republican		Swing		

Note: This table combines the certified results of January 5, 2009, listed above with the added absentee ballots from April 7, 2009, 198 for Franken and 111 for Coleman.

==== Counties that flipped from Democratic to Republican ====
- Lincoln (largest municipality: Tyler)
- Fillmore (largest city: Spring Valley)
- Grant (largest city: Elbow Lake)
- Marshall (largest city: Warren)
- Pennington (largest city: Thief River Falls)
- Polk (largest city: East Grand Forks)
- Pope (largest city: Glenwood)
- Red Lake (largest city: Red Lake Falls)
- Traverse (largest city: Wheaton)
- Yellow Medicine (largest city: Granite Falls)
- Clay (largest city: Moorhead)
- Murray (largest city: Slayton)
- Jackson (largest city: Jackson)

==== Counties that flipped from Republican to Democratic ====
- Blue Earth (largest city: Mankato)
- Nicollet (largest city: North Mankato)

=== Appeal to Minnesota Supreme Court ===
On April 20, Coleman filed a notice of appeal to the Minnesota Supreme Court. Franken's lawyers requested that the court follow an expedited schedule in hearing the case (with oral arguments scheduled for mid-May) to enable Minnesota to have two seated senators. In his reply, Coleman asked the Court to take its time, which would probably delay its decision until June. On April 24, the Court issued its order for briefs and oral arguments. Oral arguments took place on June 1. After the arguments the Minnesota Supreme Court did not indicate how soon it would render judgment.

Some Democrats and political commentators asserted that Coleman no longer had a serious chance of prevailing in the election, and that he continued to file appeals for the sole purpose of delaying the seating of a 60th member of the Democratic caucus in the U.S. Senate (after Pennsylvania Senator Arlen Specter changed his party affiliation from Republican to Democratic on April 28). Sixty Democratic senators would not need any Republican votes to overcome a filibuster. Coleman disputed that allegation. About 60% of Minnesotans (64–28, 59–34, 63–37 in three polls) said they wanted Coleman to concede.

On June 30, the Minnesota Supreme Court unanimously rejected Coleman's challenge and ruled that Franken was entitled to be certified as the winner. Coleman announced he would not appeal the result further, and congratulated Franken by phone, telling him that being senator was "the best job he would ever have". Pawlenty and Ritchie signed the election certificate that evening.

=== Further investigations ===
In July 2010, Minnesota Majority, a conservative watchdog group, conducted a study in which it flagged 2,803 voters in the Senate race for examination, including 1,359 it suspected to be ineligible convicted felons in the largely Democratic Minneapolis-St. Paul area. Subsequent investigations of Minnesota Majority's claims by election officials found that many of its allegations were incorrect. Some of the cases involved mistaking a legal voter for a felon with the same name, others involved felons who had had their voting rights reinstated after serving their sentences, and others were felons who illegally registered to vote but did not vote in 2008. Ramsey County officials narrowed their investigation to 180 cases, while Hennepin County examined 216 cases.

Pawlenty said, "They [Minnesota Majority] seem to have found credible evidence that many felons who are not supposed to be voting actually voted in the Franken-Coleman election. I suspect they favored Al Franken. I don't know that, but if that turned out to be true, they may have flipped the election." Columnist Nick Coleman of the Minneapolis-based Star Tribune called the idea that illegal voting by felons made a difference in the race "unbelievable" and the Minnesota Majority report "good fodder for a right-wing scare campaign."

As of July 2010, the Ramsey County Attorney's Office had brought charges against 28 people. In August 2010, the Hennepin County Sheriff's Office received for investigation 110 alleged cases of voter fraud in the 2008 election. In October 2010, the Hennepin County Sheriff's Office concluded that there was enough evidence to charge six people for voter fraud. "Three of the suspects face two felony charges. Three other suspects each face one felony charge." In October 2010, Hennepin County Attorney Mike Freeman announced that charges would be brought against 43 felons for illegally voting in 2008.

== See also ==
- 1974 United States Senate election in New Hampshire
- 2008 United States Senate elections
- List of close election results
