= Norm Coleman =

American lobbyist, attorney, and politician (born 1949)

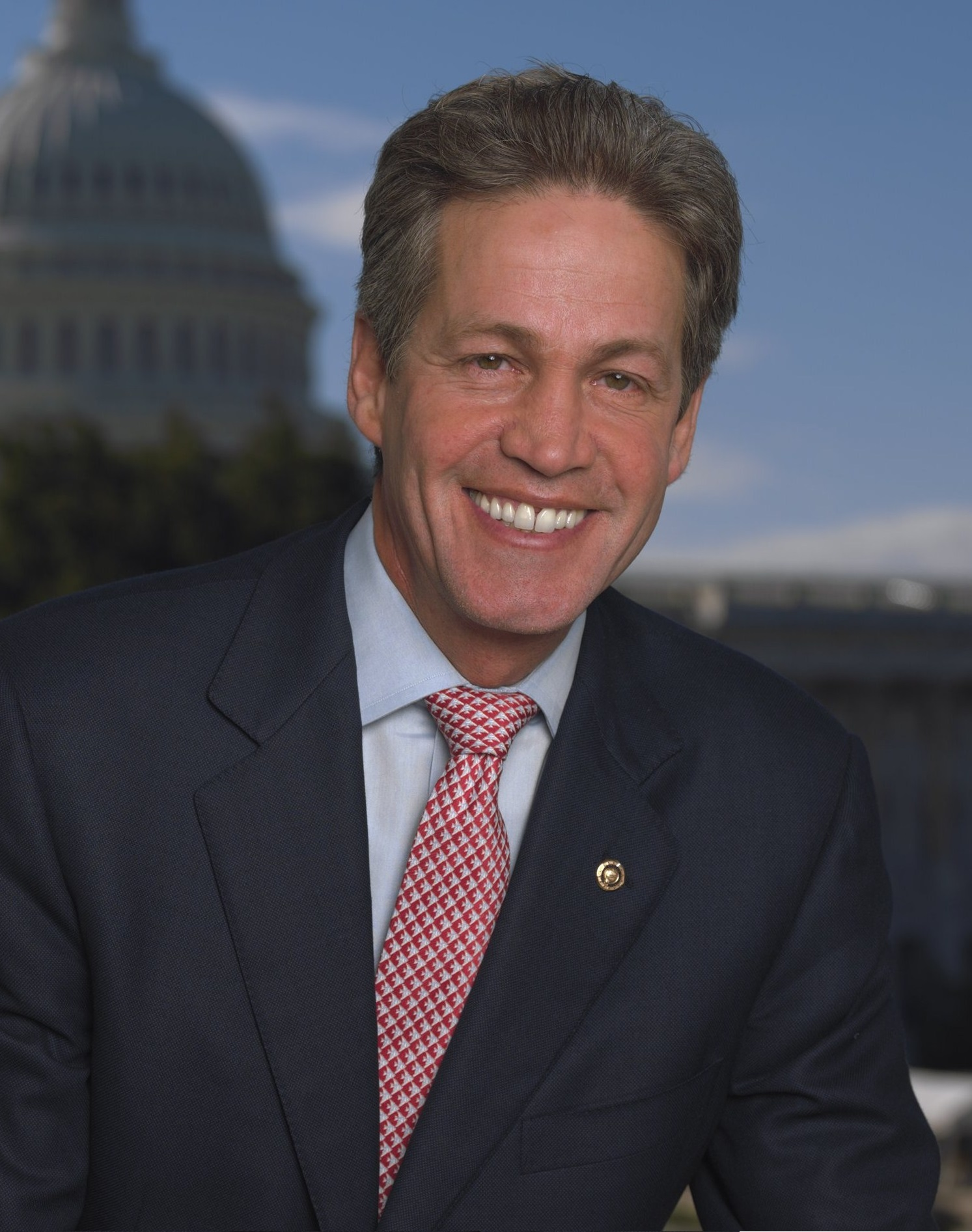
- Official portrait, 2005

United States Senator from Minnesota
- In office January 3, 2003 – January 3, 2009
- Preceded by: Dean Barkley
- Succeeded by: Al Franken

51st Mayor of Saint Paul
- In office January 1, 1994 – January 1, 2002
- Preceded by: James Scheibel
- Succeeded by: Randy Kelly

Personal details
- Born: Norman Bertram Coleman Jr. August 17, 1949 (age 77) New York City, New York, U.S.
- Party: Democratic (before 1996); Republican (1996–present)
- Spouse: Laurie Casserly (m. 1981)
- Children: 4
- Relatives: Julia Coleman (daughter-in-law)
- Education: Hofstra University (BA); University of Iowa (JD)
- Coleman's voice Coleman on the threat of Iran. Recorded March 2, 2006

Norman Bertram Coleman Jr. (born August 17, 1949) is an American politician, attorney, and lobbyist. From 2003 to 2009, he served as a United States senator for Minnesota. From 1994 to 2002, he was mayor of Saint Paul, Minnesota. First elected as a member of the Democratic–Farmer–Labor Party (DFL), Coleman became a Republican in 1996. Elected to the Senate in 2002, he was narrowly defeated in his 2008 reelection bid and retired from politics. He is the last Republican to have represented Minnesota in the U.S. Senate.

Born in New York City, Coleman was elected mayor of Saint Paul, Minnesota's capital and second-largest city, in 1993 as a member of the Democratic Party. A liberal Democrat in his youth, Coleman shifted to conservatism as an adult. After conflicts with the Democratic Party over his conservative views, Coleman joined the Republican Party. He was reelected mayor a year later as a Republican. While serving as mayor, he was the Republican nominee in the 1998 Minnesota gubernatorial election, but lost to former professional wrestler and third-party candidate Jesse Ventura.

Coleman challenged incumbent Democratic Senator Paul Wellstone in the 2002 United States Senate election in Minnesota. After Wellstone died in a plane crash a few weeks before the election, he was replaced on the ballot by former Vice President Walter Mondale. Coleman defeated Mondale by over two points. He sought reelection in 2008. In one of the closest elections in the history of the Senate, he lost to former comedian Al Franken by 312 votes out of over three million cast (a margin of just over 0.01%). Since his defeat, Coleman has been a lobbyist and chairs both the Republican Jewish Coalition and the conservative American Action Network. He is also the founder of the Congressional Leadership Fund super PAC and works as a lobbyist for the Kingdom of Saudi Arabia.

== Early life and education ==
Coleman was born in Brooklyn, the son of Norman Bertram Coleman Sr. and his wife, Beverly (Behrman). His family is Jewish, his paternal grandfather having changed the surname from Goldman to Coleman. He was a graduate of James Madison High School in Brooklyn and Hofstra University on Long Island.

In college, Coleman was an active member of the 1960s counterculture and a liberal Democrat. "Carting a bullhorn around campus, he'd regularly lecture students about the immorality of the Nixon administration and the Vietnam War." He was elected president of the student senate during his junior year. Under Coleman, the senate refused to ratify the newspaper's editor and her co-editor and cut some funding to the newspaper. But after refusing to swear in the editor on four different occasions, the senate finally backed down. Coleman celebrated his 20th birthday at the Woodstock Festival, and later admitted to smoking marijuana in his youth. He worked as a roadie for Jethro Tull and Ten Years After, among others.

Coleman attended Brooklyn Law School from 1972 until 1974 but received his Juris Doctor from the University of Iowa College of Law in 1976.

== Career ==
After graduating from law school, Coleman joined the office of the Minnesota Attorney General as a prosecutor, eventually rising to chief prosecutor and then solicitor general.

=== Mayor of Saint Paul (1994–2002) ===
Coleman left the attorney general's office upon being elected mayor of St. Paul. One of his first acts as mayor was the elimination of underfunded retirement health benefits for city workers.

One of Coleman's accomplishments as mayor was to bring professional ice hockey back to Minnesota. In 1993 the Minnesota North Stars moved to Dallas, Texas. On June 7, 1997, the NHL awarded St. Paul an expansion franchise, later named the Minnesota Wild, that would play in a new arena downtown at the site of Civic Center Arena. The arena, later named the Grand Casino Arena (formerly the Xcel Energy Center), was built through a public-private partnership, with $65 million from state taxpayers and $30 million from the city.

Coleman also successfully fought property tax increases, freezing property tax rates for the eight years he served as mayor. During his mayoralty, St. Paul's job rate grew by 7.1% and 18,000 jobs were added.

While many praised Coleman for his "pragmatic" leadership style and successes in revitalizing St. Paul, critics labeled him an "opportunist", and he was often at odds with the Democratic Party's more liberal members. In 1996 he was sometimes booed at DFL party events or excluded from them altogether.

Coleman joined the Republican Party in 1996 and was reelected mayor of St. Paul in 1997, defeating Democratic-Farmer-Labor Party nominee State Senator Sandy Pappas. He is, as of 2024, the last Republican mayor of St. Paul.

=== 1998 gubernatorial campaign ===
While announcing his party switch, Coleman said that he "didn't intend" to run for governor in 1998. But his role in bringing professional hockey back to Minnesota and his popularity in St. Paul did help fuel a run for governor that year. He easily won the Republican nomination, facing just token opposition in the primary. In the general election, he faced DFL nominee Hubert H. "Skip" Humphrey III and Reform Party nominee Jesse Ventura. Polls had Coleman and Humphrey tied for first, but Ventura won the election in an upset, with 37% of the vote to Coleman's 34.3% and Humphrey's 28.1%.

=== U.S. Senate (2003–2009) ===
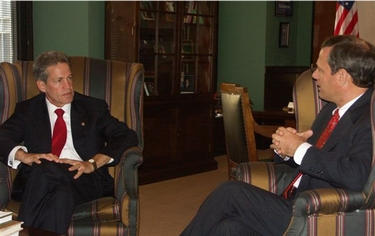
Coleman with John Roberts in 2005

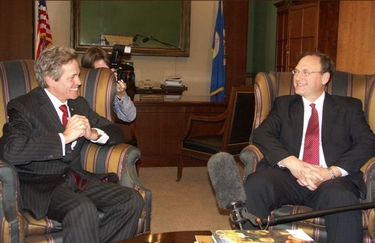
Coleman with Samuel Alito in 2005

Coleman made plans for a second run for governor in 2002, but Karl Rove and George W. Bush persuaded him to challenge incumbent Senator Paul Wellstone in the U.S. Senate election instead. Coleman had served as Wellstone's campaign chair in 1996, shortly before his decision to switch to the Republican Party. Coleman easily won the Republican nomination.

Coleman and Wellstone were neck-and-neck in most polls for most of the campaign. On October 25, Wellstone died in a plane crash. The Democrats chose former Vice President Walter Mondale to replace Wellstone on the ballot. Mondale had held the same Senate seat from 1964 to 1977. Coleman defeated Mondale by just over 61,000 votes out of over 2 million cast. He succeeded Dean Barkley, whom Ventura had appointed to serve the remaining two months of Wellstone's term.

In April 2003, Coleman told a Capitol Hill reporter that he was a "99% improvement" over Wellstone because he had a better working relationship with the White House. Many Wellstone supporters found this offensive and insulting, and at least one member of Congress urged Coleman to apologize. Coleman issued an apology, explaining that he was referring specifically to the reporter's question about the differences between his and Wellstone's relationship with the White House, and saying in part, "I would never want to diminish the legacy or memory of Senator Paul Wellstone, and I will accept full responsibility for not having been more accurate in my comments." In 2004, Coleman campaigned for the chairmanship of the National Republican Senatorial Committee (NRSC), but was defeated for the post by Senator Elizabeth Dole in a 28–27 vote.

=== 2008 reelection campaign ===
In 2008, Coleman's opponents for reelection were Dean Barkley and the DFL nominee, former Air America host and comedian Al Franken. On the day after the election, Coleman led in the counted votes and claimed victory in the race. Minnesota law requires an automatic recount when the margin between the leading candidates is less than 0.5% of the vote, and the margin between Coleman and Franken was about 0.01%. Barkley came in third with 15%.

The initial results of the recount put Franken ahead by 225 votes out of almost 2.9 million votes cast. On December 24, 2008, Coleman's lawyers said it was a "virtual certainty" that he would contest the results of the election.

Coleman's term expired on January 3, 2009. On January 5, Franken was certified as the winner of the recount by 225 votes. Coleman filed a legal challenge of the results on January 6, and a three-judge panel was seated.

On February 3, the panel allowed Coleman to introduce evidence that as many as 4,800 absentee ballots were wrongly rejected and should be counted. The Franken campaign had tried to limit Coleman to bringing evidence on only the 650 absentee ballots cited in the initial court filing.

On April 1, the panel ordered that an additional 400 absentee ballots be examined. After examining the 400 ballots on April 6, the panel ordered that an additional 351 ballots be opened and counted. On April 7, the additional 351 ballots were opened and counted before the panel and a packed courtroom. Franken got an additional 198 votes, Coleman gained 111, and other candidates received 42, increasing Franken's lead to 312 votes.

On April 13, the three-judge panel issued its final ruling, sweeping aside all of Coleman's legal claims and declaring Franken the winner of the race by 312 votes. In its unanimous decision, the panel said, "The overwhelming weight of the evidence indicates that the November 4, 2008, election was conducted fairly, impartially and accurately", and that Franken should be issued a Certificate of Election. The panel ruled that Coleman had failed to prove that mistakes or irregularities in the treatment of absentee ballots had changed the election's outcome.

Coleman appealed to the Minnesota Supreme Court, which heard oral arguments on June 1. On June 30, the court unanimously ruled in Franken's favor, declaring him the winner of the election, whereupon Coleman conceded.

==== Deep Marine Technology and corruption allegations ====
While running for reelection in 2008, Coleman was mentioned in a Texas lawsuit by Paul McKim, CEO of Deep Marine Technology (DMT), against Nasser Kazeminy. Kazeminy was a longtime Coleman supporter who owned a controlling share of DMT. The petition alleged that Kazeminy had used DMT to funnel $75,000 or more to Laurie Coleman through her employer, Hays Companies, in order to enrich Senator Coleman. McKim's petition covered several issues, of which the Coleman matter was only one. Coleman's 2009 Senate financial disclosure form disclosed that Laurie Coleman received a salary from Hays Companies, but Senate rules do not require the salary amount to be revealed. Neither Coleman nor his wife was named as a defendant in the suit. On October 31, minority shareholders in DMT filed a related suit in Delaware Chancery Court. The Delaware suit also alleged that Kazeminy had used DMT to funnel unearned funds to Laurie Coleman through Hays Companies. As in the Texas case, the Colemans were not named as defendants.

Coleman was not charged with any crime regarding allegations of corruption in receiving gifts of $100,000 from Kazeminy. Doug Grow, a MinnPost columnist, expressed skepticism about Coleman's attorneys' claim that the lack of charges meant that Coleman and Kazeminy were not guilty of any wrongdoing. Coleman responded with a campaign ad in which he denied the allegations and blamed them on Franken.

In June 2011, the U.S. Justice Department decided not to file charges against Coleman or Kazeminy. Louis Freeh, an attorney for Kazeminy and a former FBI Director in the Clinton Administration, said he learned the Justice Department had ended the investigation in a February 24 meeting with Andrew Levchuk of the department's Public Integrity Section in Washington.

Kazeminy hired Freeh to conduct an independent investigation of all charges. He concluded that there was no wrongdoing or impropriety by the Colemans or Kazeminy. Freeh said that both his investigation and a separate Deep Marine board investigation concluded McKim had made false claims in an attempt to force a larger severance package out of Deep Marine. The Intercept, questioning Freeh's impartiality, reported that nine days after Freeh's investigation cleared Kazeminy of wrongdoing, Kazeminy gave Freeh's wife a one-half ownership stake in a Palm Beach property valued at $3 million. McKim's allegations were repeated hundreds of times in local and national media reports during the waning days of the 2008 election in what Coleman called "multi-million-dollar attacks against my family and Nasser Kazeminy".

Freeh says McKim later prepared an affidavit that would have recanted his allegations against the Colemans and Kazeminy in exchange for a financial settlement. He concluded that McKim had a clear motive to use false allegations as leverage to enrich himself. McKim still questioned the legitimacy of insurance payments and said he had done nothing wrong, but another of Kazeminy's attorneys said his client had not ruled out future litigation against McKim.

A columnist at The Weekly Standard wrote, "it is possible that the allegations against Coleman may have handed victory to Al Franken."

== Post-political career ==
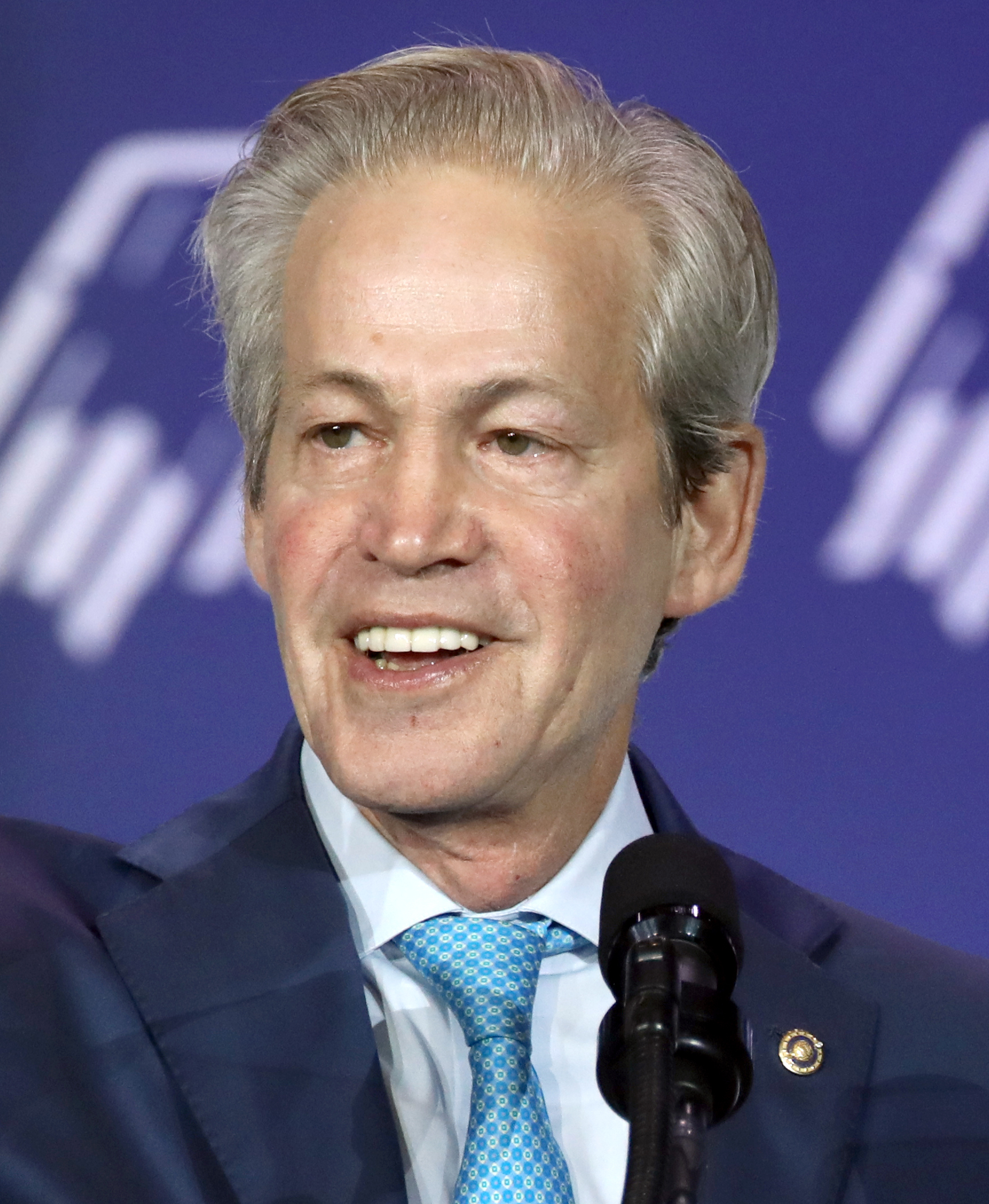
Coleman in October 2023

In January 2009, Coleman became an adviser to and board member of the Republican Jewish Coalition.

After Minnesota Governor Tim Pawlenty announced he would not seek reelection in 2010, it was widely anticipated that Coleman would run for governor in the 2010 gubernatorial election. Polling conducted in late 2009 showed him as the favorite among Republicans. But on January 17, 2010, Coleman announced that he would not run, saying, "The timing on this race is both a bit too soon and a bit too late. It is too soon after my last race and too late to do a proper job of seeking the support of delegates who will decide in which direction our party should go. The commitments I have to my family and the work I am currently engaged in do not allow me to now go forward."

In 2010, Coleman became chairman and CEO of the American Action Network, which he co-founded. He was considered a front-runner for the position of chair of the Republican National Committee in 2010 in the event that incumbent Michael Steele did not seek reelection. Coleman said he would not run for the chairmanship if Steele ran for reelection, and did not after Steele announced his candidacy.

In 2013, Coleman confirmed he would not challenge Franken in the 2014 Senate election. He also declined to run against Governor Mark Dayton in the 2014 gubernatorial election.

=== Lobbying career ===
In April 2011, Coleman joined Hogan Lovells, an international legal practice, as senior government advisor in its Washington D.C. office. He stepped down as leader of the Government Relations and Public Affairs practice at Hogan Lovells in January 2020, but remains a senior counsel.

Coleman is on the National Advisory Council for the U.S. Global Leadership Coalition, a bipartisan committee that promotes international engagement and includes every living former U.S. secretary of state. He also works as a lobbyist on behalf of the government of Saudi Arabia. In 2024, he was among the Hogan Lovells lobbyists U.S. Steel hired to navigate legal scrutiny of proposed acquisition of the company by Nippon Steel.

== Political positions ==
Coleman's politics have changed dramatically during his political career.

=== College ===
In college, Coleman was a liberal Democrat and actively involved in the antiwar movement of the early 1970s; he was once suspended for leading a sit-in protest. He ran for student senate and opined in the school newspaper that his fellow students should vote for him because "These conservative kids don't fuck or get high like we do (purity, you know) ... Already the cries of motherhood, apple pie, and Jim Buckley reverberate through the halls of the Student Center. Everyone watch out, the 1950s bobby-sox generation is about to take over."

=== Becoming a Republican ===
While running for mayor in 1993, Coleman wrote in a letter to the City Convention Delegates: "I have never sought any other political office. I have no other ambition other than to be mayor." In the letter he wrote:

I am a lifelong Democrat. Some accuse me of being the fiscal conservative in this race—I plead guilty! I'm not afraid to be tight with your tax dollars. Yet, my fiscal conservatism does not mean I am any less progressive in my Democratic ideals. From Bobby Kennedy to George McGovern to Warren Spannaus to Hubert Humphrey to Walter Mondale—my commitment to the great values of our party has remained solid.

In 1996, Coleman chaired Paul Wellstone's Senate reelection campaign. In his nomination speech at the 1996 state DFL convention, Coleman said, "Paul Wellstone is a Democrat, and I am a Democrat." Tensions were so high between Coleman and the DFL party at the time that a number of convention delegates loudly booed Coleman's speech.

In December 1996, Coleman announced he was leaving the DFL to join the Republican Party. He cited his frustrations with the Democratic Party and his belief that the Republican Party offered the best chance to continue his efforts to hold the line on taxes and grow jobs.

Coleman's critics, mostly DFL party leaders, speculated that his switch was motivated by aspiration to statewide office. As an abortion opponent and a frequent adversary of public employee unions, Coleman was at odds with the DFL leadership. In a letter to supporters announcing the switch, he wrote, "while the political party I belong to changes, nothing about how I govern or what I believe changes at all." He was reelected mayor of St. Paul in 1997 with nearly 60% of the vote.

=== As senator ===
Coleman was a member of the Republican Main Street Partnership. In March 2007, National Journal ranked him the fourth most liberal Republican in the Senate. GovTrack, an independent tracking website, also called Coleman a "moderate Republican".

In September 2008, Coleman joined the bipartisan Gang of 20, which was seeking a solution to the American energy crisis. The group pushed for a bill that would encourage state-by-state decisions on offshore drilling and authorize billions of dollars for conservation and alternative energy.

Coleman received a 14% progressive rating from Progressive Punch and a 73% conservative rating from the conservative SBE Council. Minnesota's other senator at the time, Mark Dayton, received ratings of 90% progressive and 9% conservative from the same groups.

=== Specific issues ===
==== Energy independence ====
Coleman was a strong supporter of bipartisan efforts to create American independence from foreign sources of energy. This included development of alternative sources of energy such as wind, ethanol, and biofuels.

In 2005, Coleman led a bipartisan coalition of 34 senators in securing a renewable fuels package as part of the 2005 Energy Policy Act, which included new standards for renewable fuels and an extension of tax credits for biodiesel, small ethanol producers and wind and livestock waste.

Coleman supported additional oil exploration in the outer continental shelf, but maintained a campaign promise to oppose drilling in the Arctic National Wildlife Refuge (ANWR).

On December 11, 2005, Coleman voted to invoke cloture on, thus advancing, a defense appropriations bill that included oil exploration in ANWR. Critics viewed this as a violation of his pledge to oppose such drilling. Coleman said he did so because although he planned to vote against the bill, he did not believe that a filibuster was warranted. His vote notwithstanding, the filibuster held, and Coleman voted to strip the ANWR provision from the bill in a subsequent vote.

Coleman received a score of 33% for 2007 from the League of Conservation Voters, in their view, taking the pro-environment position in just 5 of 14 cases.

==== Agriculture ====
As a member of the Senate's Agriculture Committee, Coleman played an important role in agriculture policy. In 2008 he helped author the Farm Bill. He was praised for his efforts to improve the bill's provisions with regard to sugar, a mainstay of northwestern Minnesota's economy, as well as the bill's dairy program. Coleman also worked for the inclusion of a permanent agriculture disaster assistance program and hailed the bill's investments in conservation, nutrition, and renewable energy. He broke with his fellow Republicans in several instances over agriculture policy, notably by voting for the bill to move forward, and ultimately played a critical role in breaking the stalemate that had delayed Senate consideration of the bill.

Coleman twice voted to override President Bush's veto of the Farm Bill.

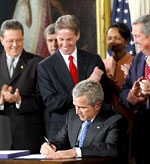
Picture of Coleman, President Bush, and others at DR-CAFTA signing

Coleman expressed reservations about supporting DR-CAFTA (Dominican Republic – Central America Free Trade Agreement) unless the interests of the domestic U.S. sugar industry (including Minnesota's sugar beet industry) were accommodated. He voted in favor of DR-CAFTA after obtaining quotas imposed on foreign sugar until 2008. He stood behind Bush on August 2, 2005, as the trade agreement was signed into law. "This is a three-year insurance policy that I have purchased for my sugar farmers," he said.

==== Fiscal issues ====
Coleman was generally regarded as a fiscal centrist who supported increasing the minimum wage and safeguarding pensions while at the same time supporting broad tax relief and the line-item veto.

Coleman played an important role in the passage of the Pension Protection Act of 2006. In addition to safeguarding the pensions of all Americans, the legislation is credited with saving the pensions of over 24,000 Northwest Airlines employees and retirees in Minnesota.

Coleman consistently voted to increase the minimum wage as senator.

Coleman had a consistent record of voting for broad tax reform. He supported reductions to the capital gains tax and the marriage penalty, and supported doubling the child tax credit. Coleman also supported elimination of the AMT and death tax. He supported efforts to make permanent the tax cuts enacted by the Economic Growth and Tax Relief Reconciliation Act of 2001 and the Jobs and Growth Tax Relief Reconciliation Act of 2003.

As a member of the Small Business Committee, Coleman opposed eliminating the Microloan program, supported funding for Small Business Development Centers and the HUBZone program, successfully extended tax exemptions for Section 179 expensing, and cosponsored an amendment to increase funding for the Small Business Administration by $130 million.

Coleman is a longtime supporter of the line-item veto, calling it a "no-brainer, the right thing to do."

==== Iraq, Iran, and Israel ====
Coleman speaking at the Republican Jewish Coalition 2026 Annual Leadership Summit

Coleman was a strong supporter of the Iraq War from the start. In 2008, he still supported the war, generally tending to agree with the Bush administration. He was in favor of the eventual removal of U.S. troops from Iraq, but did not support any kind of timetable for their removal until the situation stabilized. An August 2008 MinnPost article summarized his position as: "He believes the prospects are good for a drawdown of U.S. troops, but it must be done based on conditions on the ground as reported by commanders in the field, not according to an 'arbitrary' timetable set for 'political' reasons in Washington."

Coleman has also been outspoken about his belief that Iran poses a threat to Western democracies. He has sponsored Congressional Resolutions aimed at Iran, including measures condemning what the US deemed as violations of the Nuclear Non-Proliferation Treaty and other international obligations. Coleman led an effort to bring worldwide pressure on Iran to stop its attempts to enrich uranium, which many believed was the final step in an effort to gain offensive nuclear weapons capabilities.

Coleman co-sponsored several pieces of legislation to increase sanctions on Iran, including divestment of American pension funds in companies that do business with Iran and sanctions against countries that provide it with nuclear technology. In 2007, he said, "For the sake of our national security, the U.S. must ensure that the sensitive nuclear technology that we share with partner countries does not fall into the hands of the Iranians."

Coleman is an outspoken supporter of Israel. He cosponsored the Palestinian Anti-Terrorism Act of 2006 and sent then Secretary of State Condoleezza Rice a letter urging her to investigate Egypt's alleged smuggling of arms to Palestinian militants in the Gaza Strip.

Coleman led the Republican Jewish Coalition delegation to meet directly with Prime Minister Benjamin Netanyahu.

==== Immigration reform ====
Coleman was a strong supporter of Bush's 2006 and 2007 attempts to pass comprehensive immigration reform in the Senate, one of the few Republicans to do so.

==== Drug control ====
Coleman admitted to using marijuana as a youth, and he advocated its legalization while in college. He has said that maturity led him to understand that his drug use was dangerous and has repeatedly stated his opposition to legalized drugs, including marijuana. He has said, "I oppose the legalization of marijuana because, as noted by the Office of National Drug Control Policy, marijuana can have serious adverse health effects on individuals. The health problems that may occur from this highly addictive drug include short-term memory loss, anxiety, respiratory illness and a risk of lung cancer that far exceeds that of tobacco products. It would also make our transportation, schools and workplaces, just as examples, more dangerous."

==== Social issues ====
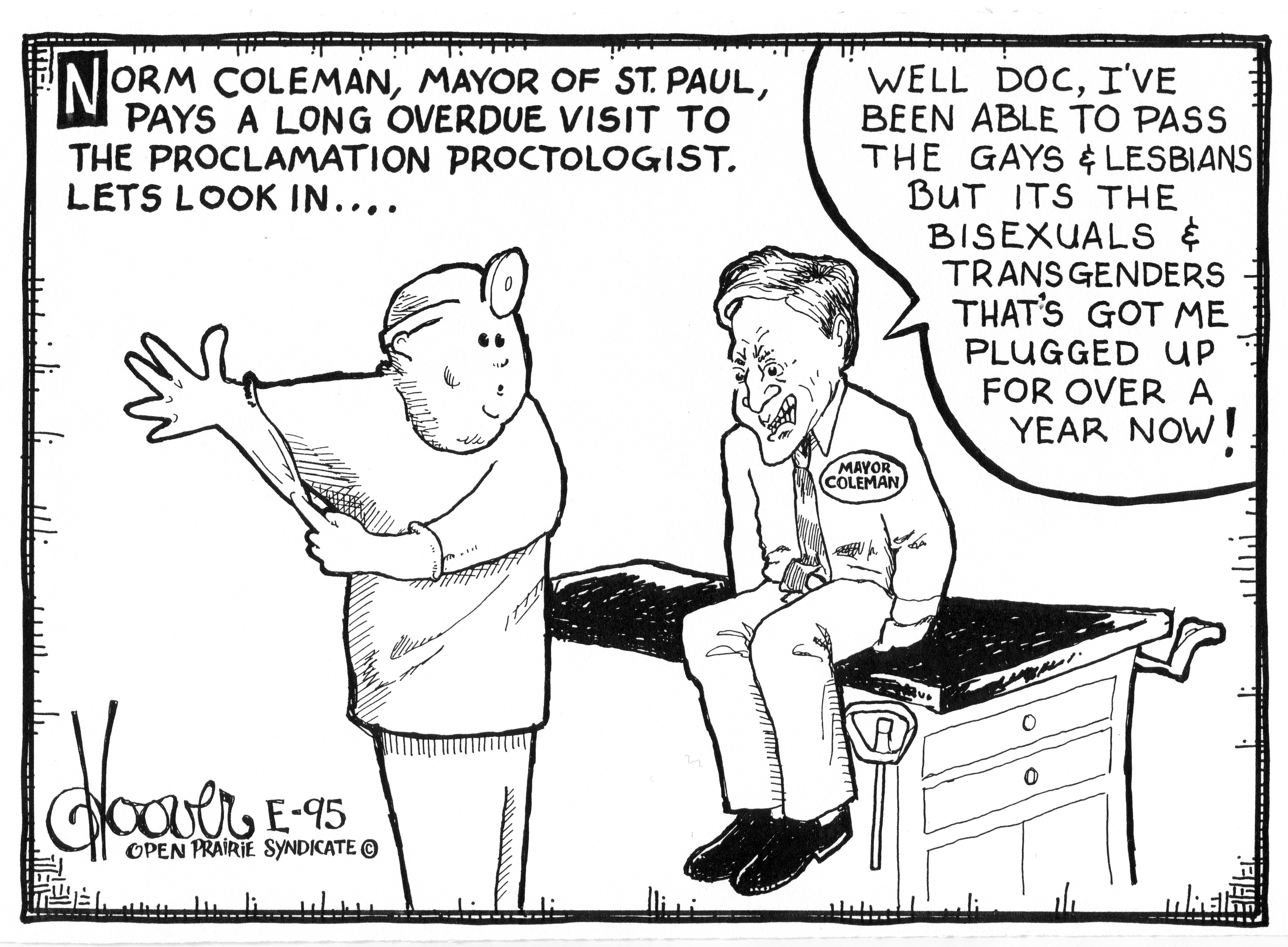
1995 editorial cartoon, run in LGBTQ newspapers, on Coleman's refusal to sign gay pride proclamation

Coleman has campaigned as an anti-abortion candidate since at least 1993. He attributes this position to the death of two of his four children in infancy from a rare genetic disease. He supports limiting stem cell research to adult stem cells and stem cells derived from umbilical cord blood, and in July 2006 voted against lifting restrictions on federal research dollars for new embryonic stem cell lines. Coleman is a member of the Republican Main Street Partnership, which supports embryonic stem cell research. He voted in favor of legislative intervention to prolong the life of severely brain-damaged Floridian Terri Schiavo.

Coleman opposed recognition of same-sex marriages by either the federal or state governments. In his 2002 Senate campaign he pledged support for an amendment to the United States Constitution that would ban any state from legalizing same-sex marriage. In 2004 and 2006 he voted in favor of such an amendment.

As mayor Coleman refused to sign a city proclamation celebrating the annual gay pride festival, explaining his opposition: "What we have had in St. Paul and Minneapolis for many years is signing a joint proclamation making it gay/lesbian/bisexual/transgender month. I will say that I support human rights ... And of course that includes sexual orientation. On the other hand, I've felt very strongly that it wasn't government's responsibility to give proclamations for people's sexuality. I don't think government has a responsibility to issue awards for one's sexuality." Coleman hired Susan Kimberly, a trans woman, as deputy mayor in 1998. Kimberly also worked as state legislative director in Coleman's Minnesota Senate office.

==== Social Security ====
Coleman supported allowing workers to divert a portion of their Social Security contributions to the creation of individual accounts to be invested in the stock market, a variation of a general plan supporters call "personal accounts," historically known as privatization. He agreed with Bush's statements that the contribution changes would apply to those younger than 55. "The Social Security system for those folks 55 and over will not change in any way, shape or form—no ifs, ands, or buts," he said.

==== Relationship with the Bush administration ====
In 2002, the Bush administration persuaded Coleman to run against Wellstone rather than for governor.

In December 2005, Coleman voted for a budget bill that cut funding from a number of programs but kept funding for sugar beet farmers in Minnesota after Rove asked him to support the administration's position on the issue. Coleman told Congress Daily that he would not vote for a bill that cut sugar beet funding but "Karl Rove called me and asked what I wanted. A few hours later it was out of the bill."

On March 14, 2006, Coleman called on Bush to replace or reorganize his staff, saying that they did not sufficiently have their "ears to the ground" on matters like Hurricane Katrina, Harriet Miers's failed Supreme Court nomination, and the Dubai Ports World controversy, and accusing the administration of having a "tin ear." He said they showed inadequate "political sensitivity" in their handling of the issues.

On January 22, 2007, Coleman and fellow Republican Senators John Warner and Susan Collins joined Democrats in opposing Bush's planned troop increase in Iraq.

==== United Nations reform ====
Coleman worked to root out corruption at the United Nations, targeting the so-called "oil-for-food" program.

In May 2005, the Senate's Permanent Subcommittee on Investigations, chaired by Coleman, held hearings on abuses of the UN Oil-for-Food program, including oil smuggling, illegal kickbacks and use of surcharges, and Saddam Hussein's use of oil vouchers to buy influence abroad. These Oil-for-Food Program Hearings covered corporations (including Bayoil) and several well-known political figures of various nations (including Vladimir Zhironovsky), but are best remembered for the confrontational appearance of British politician George Galloway, then a Member of Parliament (MP) for the RESPECT The Unity Coalition (Respect). Coleman accused Galloway of abuses that Galloway provably denied.

The previous year, Coleman had called on UN Secretary-general Kofi Annan to resign for other alleged program abuses. On June 2, 2006, Coleman responded to criticism that he had insufficiently investigated the Australian Wheat Board (AWB) for sanctions busting, saying that there were legal and cost hurdles. Then Prime Minister of Australia John Howard supported the invasion of Iraq. The Australian ambassador to the U.S., Michael Thawley, met with Coleman in late 2004 to lobby against any investigation of AWB.

Coleman was selected to be a delegate to the U.N. 61st General Assembly in New York, where he pressed for reform and action on Darfur and Iran.

==== Government infrastructure ====
On February 10, 2006, in a meeting of the Senate Committee on Homeland Security and Governmental Affairs of which Coleman was a member, during testimony of former Federal Emergency Management Agency (FEMA) director Michael D. Brown, Coleman attacked Brown for poor leadership during Hurricane Katrina disaster relief efforts, saying, "you didn't provide the leadership, even with structural infirmities", "you're not prepared to kind of put a mirror in front of your face and recognize your own inadequacies", and "the record reflects that you didn't get it or you didn't in writing or in some way make commands that would move people to do what has to be done until way after it should have been done." Brown responded combatively, "well, senator, that's very easy for you to say sitting behind that dais and not being there in the middle of that disaster, watching that human suffering and watching those people dying and trying to deal with those structural dysfunctionalities". and implored Coleman to stick to questions. He later likened Coleman's charges to a "drive-by shooting." Brown had recently said that he notified the Department of Homeland Security and the White House of the tremendous scale of Katrina flooding earlier than had been previously reported.

On March 14, 2006, Coleman introduced a bill that would ban foreign companies from operating ports in the United States.

In March 2007, Coleman introduced legislation (S. 754) to kill the Defense Travel System, a program intended to automate the purchasing of travel services by the U.S. Department of Defense, which accounts for more than half of the federal government's total outlays of around $11 billion annually for travel, including transportation, lodging, and rental cars. Shortly after he filed the legislation, Coleman received a generous contribution from the CEO of Carlson Companies, which owns Carlson Wagonlit Travel, a business travel management firm whose CW Government Travel unit provides travel management services for some federal agencies. The Carlson Companies are based in Minnesota. Over the years, Coleman has received tens of thousands of dollars in campaign donations from people connected with Carlson Companies.

== Personal life ==
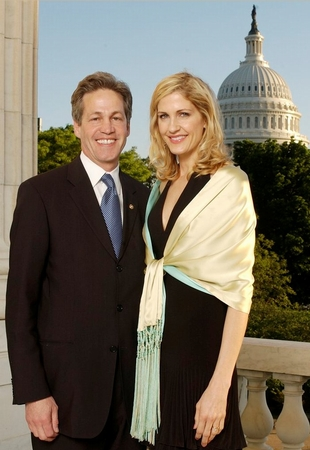
Norm Coleman with his wife Laurie

Coleman married actress Laurie Casserly in 1981. The couple have two children, Jacob and Sarah. Two other children died during infancy (Adam, 1983; Grace, 1992) from a rare genetic disorder known as Zellweger syndrome. In 2016, Jacob Coleman announced his candidacy for an open Minnesota Senate seat held by Julianne Ortman, but did not win the Republican endorsement. Coleman's daughter-in-law, Julia Coleman, won election to the state senate seat in 2021.

Coleman is a member of the Freemason fraternity, having been made a Mason at sight in 2003 by then Grand Master of Masons in Minnesota Neil Neddermeyer.

Coleman was on the America Abroad Media advisory board.

On September 11, 2009, Coleman announced he had been diagnosed with Bell's palsy. Doctors told him that he should fully recover from it. On August 14, 2018, Coleman announced that cancer he had been battling in his neck and throat had spread to his lungs.

== Electoral history ==
2008 Minnesota U.S. Senate Election
Party	Candidate	Votes	%	±%
Democratic (DFL)	Al Franken	1,212,629	42.0	−5.4
Republican	Norm Coleman	1,212,317	42.0	−7.6
Independence	Dean Barkley	437,505	15.2	+13.2
Libertarian	Charles Aldrich	13,923	0.5	n/a
Constitution	James Niemackl	8,907	0.3	+0.2
Write-ins		2,365	0.1	
Margin of victory		312	nil	
Turnout		2,887,337	100	+28

2002 Minnesota U.S. Senate Election
Party	Candidate	Votes	%	±%
Republican	Norm Coleman	1,116,697	49.5	+8.3
Democratic (DFL)	Walter Mondale	1,067,246	47.3	−3.0
Independence	Jim Moore	45,139	2.0	−5.0
Democratic (DFL)	Paul Wellstone	11,381	0.5	
Green	Ray Tricomo	10,119	0.5	

Minnesota Gubernatorial Election 1998
Party	Candidate	Votes	%	±%
Reform	Jesse Ventura	768,356	37	
Republican	Norm Coleman	713,410	34	
Democratic (DFL)	Hubert Humphrey III	581,497	28	

St. Paul Mayoral Election 1997
Party	Candidate	Votes	%	±%
Republican	Norm Coleman (incumbent)		58.7	
Democratic (DFL)	Sandy Pappas		40.8	

St. Paul Mayoral Election 1993
Party	Candidate	Votes	%	±%
Democratic (DFL)	Norm Coleman		54.7	
Democratic (DFL)	Andy Dawkins		44.3	

== See also ==
- List of American politicians who switched parties in office
- USA Congressional staff edits to Wikipedia
- Politics of Minnesota
- List of Jewish members of the United States Congress
- Jeff Larson

Political offices
Preceded by James Scheibel	Mayor of Saint Paul; 1994–2002	Succeeded by Randy Kelly
Party political offices
Preceded by Arne Carlson	Republican nominee for Governor of Minnesota; 1998	Succeeded by Tim Pawlenty
Preceded by Rudy Boschwitz	Republican nominee for U.S. Senator from Minnesota (Class 2); 2002, 2008	Succeeded by Mike McFadden
U.S. Senate
Preceded by Dean Barkley	U.S. Senator (Class 2) from Minnesota; 2003–2009; Served alongside: Mark Dayton, Amy Klobuchar	Succeeded by Al Franken
U.S. order of precedence (ceremonial)
Preceded by Mark Dayton as Former U.S. Senator	Order of precedence of the United States	Succeeded by Tim Wirth as Former U.S. Senator
