= Re:Power =

U.S. progressive advocacy organization

re:power
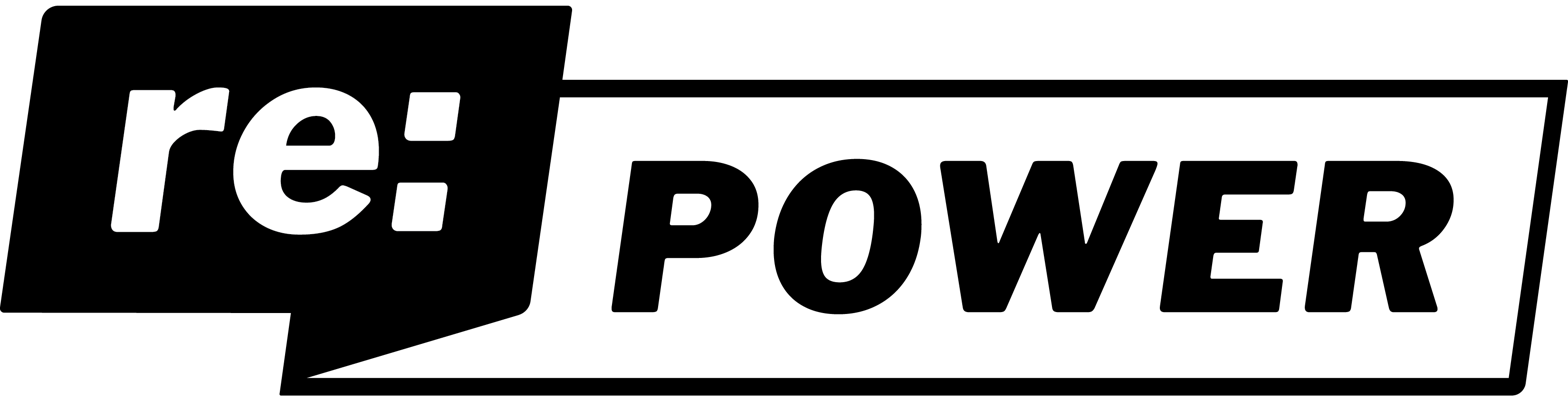
- Formation: 2002
- Purpose: Grassroots campaign training organization for progressives
- Headquarters: Minneapolis, Minnesota
- Executive Director: Karundi Williams
- Website: repower.org

re:power, formerly Wellstone Action (stylized in all lowercase), is an American 501(c)(4) progressive advocacy organization founded by longtime political operative Jeff Blodgett. Based in Minnesota, it trains community organizers, student activists, campaign staff, progressive candidates and elected officials.

The organization was originally named after Paul Wellstone, a U.S. Senator who died in a plane crash along with his wife, Sheila, and daughter, Marcia, on October 25, 2002. After Wellstone's death, his surviving sons David and Mark, who had not been on the plane, and former campaign manager founded the group to carry on Wellstone's populist approach to progressive politics.

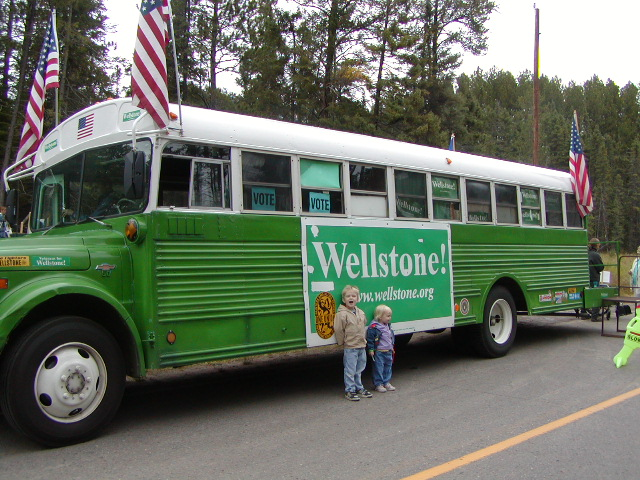

Tim Walz, elected in 2006 to represent Minnesota's 1st congressional district, was the progressive training program's first successful candidate at the federal level. Mark Ritchie, Minnesota's former Secretary of State, is also a Wellstone Action alum.

In May 2018, it was reported that the organization's board of directors had voted to remove Wellstone's two sons from their directorial positions after they raised questions about the financial activities of the organization. There was also a dispute over the direction and priorities of the group. Following the removal of Wellstone's sons from the organization's board of directors, Wellstone Action was rebranded as "re:power".

== Camp Wellstone ==
Wellstone Action began by organizing "Camp Wellstone" events to train political novices in how to run for elected office.

Between 2003 and 2013, approximately 55,000 participants graduated from Camp Wellstone trainings.

"Campus Camp Wellstone" events were also held at colleges, beginning at Carleton College, where Wellstone had previously taught. The Campus Camp Wellstone series organized at De Anza College in the San Francisco Bay Area continue under the name California Campus Camp.
