= 2002 United States Senate election in Minnesota =

- November 5, 2002
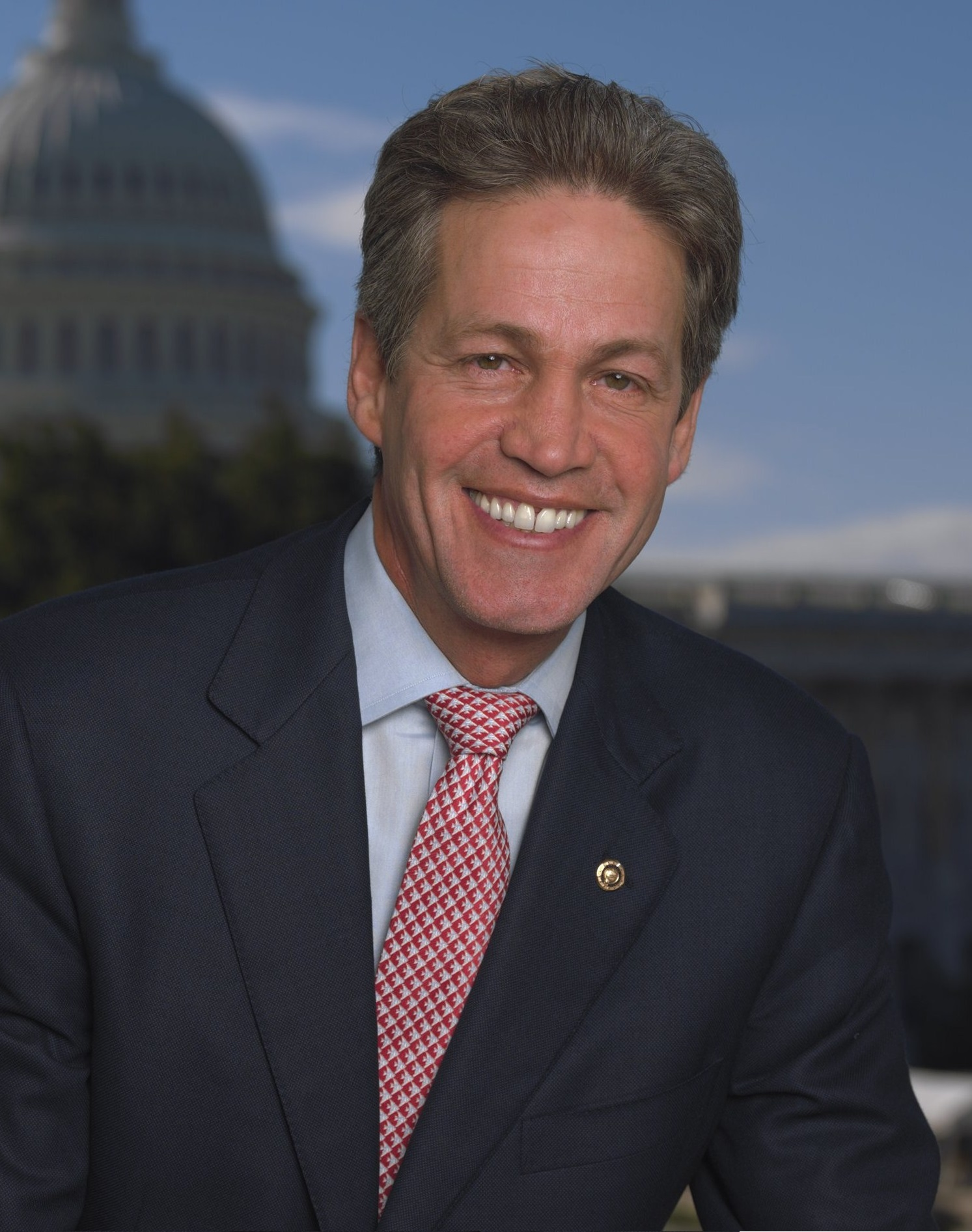

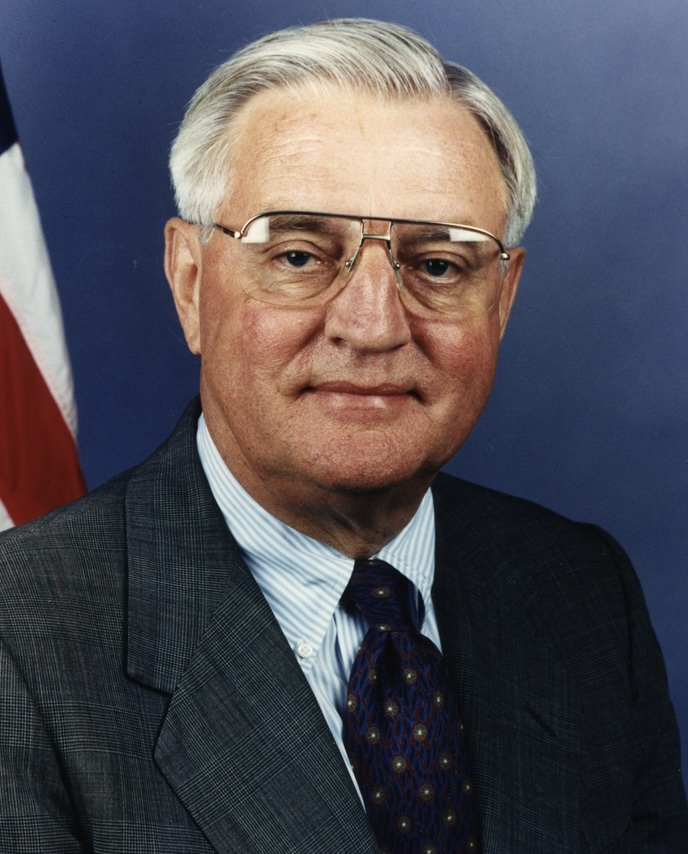
| Nominee | Norm Coleman | Walter Mondale (replacing Paul Wellstone†) |
| Party | Republican | Democratic (DFL) |
| Popular vote | 1,116,697 | 1,067,246 |
| Percentage | 49.53% | 47.34% |
- Coleman: 30–40% 40–50% 50–60% 60–70% 70–80% 80–90% >90% Mondale: 30–40% 40–50% 50–60% 60–70% 70–80% 80–90% >90% Moore: 40–50% Wellstone: 50–60% 60–70% 70–80% Write-ins: 40–50% >90% Tie: 30–40% 40–50% 50% No votes
U.S. senator before election
Dean Barkley (Note: In October 2002, Barkley was appointed by Governor Jesse Ventura to fill the vacancy caused by the death of incumbent Senator Paul Wellstone eleven days before the election. Barkley served the last two months of Wellstone's term.)
Independence
Elected U.S. Senator
Norm Coleman
Republican

The 2002 United States Senate election in Minnesota took place on November 5, 2002. Incumbent Senator Paul Wellstone won the Democratic–Farmer–Labor Party (DFL) renomination on September 10 primaries, but he was killed in a plane crash eleven days before the election. The DFL quickly chose former Vice President and 1984 presidential nominee Walter Mondale to replace Wellstone on the ballot. Mondale had previously held the seat from 1964 to 1976, resigning to assume the vice presidency.

Mondale narrowly lost to Republican Norm Coleman, the former mayor of Saint Paul. The day before the election, Governor Jesse Ventura had appointed the 1996 Independence Party candidate, Dean Barkley, to serve the remainder of Wellstone's term.

This is the last time in a midterm election that the party controlling the White House flipped a Senate seat in a state they did not win in the preceding presidential election. Wellstone was the last incumbent senator to die ahead of an election after being nominated until Lindsey Graham in the 2026 South Carolina Senate race.

This marked the first election that Mondale had lost in Minnesota. He had even narrowly carried the state against Ronald Reagan in what was otherwise his landslide defeat in the 1984 United States presidential election. He lost in 49 states, winning only Minnesota and the District of Columbia. As a result of his defeat in this 2002 senatorial election, Mondale became the first, and so far only, major-party candidate in American history to have lost a general election in every single state.

As of 2026, this is the last time a Republican won a U.S. Senate election in Minnesota, and the only time since 1994.

== Primary elections ==
=== DFL ===
Paul Wellstone defeated Dick Franson 93% to 5%.

Following Wellstone's death 11 days prior to Election Day, the DFL Party nominated Walter Mondale as its replacement candidate.

=== Republican ===
Norm Coleman defeated Jack Shepard 95% to 5%.

== General election ==
=== Candidates ===
- Norm Coleman, former mayor of Saint Paul and nominee for governor in 1998 (Republican)
- Miro Drago Kovatchevick, systems analyst from Minneapolis (Constitution)
- Walter Mondale, former Vice President of the United States and United States Senator (Democratic-Farmer-Labor)
- Jim Moore, commercial banker from Minneapolis (Independent)
- Ray Tricomo, professor from Oakdale (Green)

==== Deceased ====
- Paul Wellstone, incumbent Senator since 1991 (Democratic-Farmer-Labor) (died October 25)

=== Campaign ===
Mondale campaigned on his experience, and promised more education for students, more safety for seniors, and to "continue Wellstone's fight for people". Coleman campaigned on more jobs, less taxes, a promise of "a brighter future for Minnesota", and to "help change the tone in Washington D.C."

At the time of his death, Wellstone was slightly ahead in the polls. After Mondale was chosen as the DFL candidate, he led 47% to 39% in a poll taken a few days before the election.

Four days after Wellstone's death, a televised public memorial drew significant backlash for a tone that was widely characterized as more appropriate for a "political rally"—a story that dominated the final days before the election.

Early on Election Day, Mondale was leading, but by nightfall Coleman pulled ahead, winning by 2.2%. Many observers, including the event's host, former St. Paul mayor George Latimer, blamed the memorial's tone for the election result.

=== Debates ===
- Complete video of debate, October 11, 2002
- Complete video of debate, October 15, 2002
- Complete video of debate, November 1, 2002
- Complete video of debate, November 4, 2002

=== Predictions ===
| Source | Ranking | As of |
|---|---|---|
| Sabato's Crystal Ball | Lean D | November 4, 2002 |

=== Results ===
General election results
| Party | Candidate | Votes | % | ±% |
|---|---|---|---|---|
| Republican | Norm Coleman | 1,116,697 | 49.53% | +8.25% |
| Democratic (DFL) | Walter Mondale | 1,067,246 | 47.34% | −2.98% |
| Independence | Jim Moore | 45,139 | 2.00% | −4.98% |
| Democratic (DFL) | Paul Wellstone (incumbent)† (Note: Absentee ballots cast for Wellstone before his death.) | 11,381 | 0.50% | n/a |
| Green | Ray Tricomo | 10,119 | 0.48% | n/a |
| Constitution | Miro Drago Kovatchevich | 2,254 | 0.10% | n/a |
| Write-in | | 1,803 | 0.08% | n/a |
| Total votes | | 2,254,639 | 100.00% | n/a |
| Republican gain from Independence | | | | |

==== Counties that flipped from Democratic to Republican ====
- Anoka (largest city: Blaine)
- Blue Earth (largest city: Mankato)
- Chisago (largest city: North Branch)
- Clay (largest city: Moorhead)
- Dakota (largest city: Hastings)
- Goodhue (largest city: Red Wing)
- Isanti (largest city: Cambridge)
- Kanabec (largest city: Mora)
- Kandiyohi (largest city: Willmar)
- Le Sueur (largest city: Le Sueur)
- Mahnomen (largest city: Mahnomen)
- Marshall (largest city: Warren)
- Mille Lacs (largest city: Princeton)
- Murray (largest city: Slayton)
- Nicollet (largest city: North Mankato)
- Polk (largest city: East Grand Forks)
- Renville (largest city: Olivia)
- Stevens (largest city: Morris)
- Washington (largest city: Stillwater)
- Watonwan (largest city: St. James)

==== Counties that flipped from Republican to Democratic ====
- Fillmore (largest city: Spring Valley)
- Winona (largest city: Winona)

== Aftermath ==
After Coleman was declared the winner, Mondale conceded and said in his speech: "At the end of what will be my last campaign, I want to say to Minnesota, you always treated me well, you always listened to me". His loss, combined with his landslide defeat in the United States presidential election in 1984, made him the only American major-party candidate to have lost a general election in every state. Although George McGovern had also lost 49 states in the 1972 presidential election and lost the Massachusetts Democratic presidential primary in 1984, he never lost a general election in Massachusetts. Although Mondale did not seek office again, he remained active politically.

Coleman was sworn in on January 3, 2003. He served one term in the United States Senate, losing to Al Franken by a very narrow margin of just 312 votes or 0.01% in the 2008 election.

== See also ==
- 2002 United States Senate elections
