= Paul Wellstone =

American politician (1944–2002)

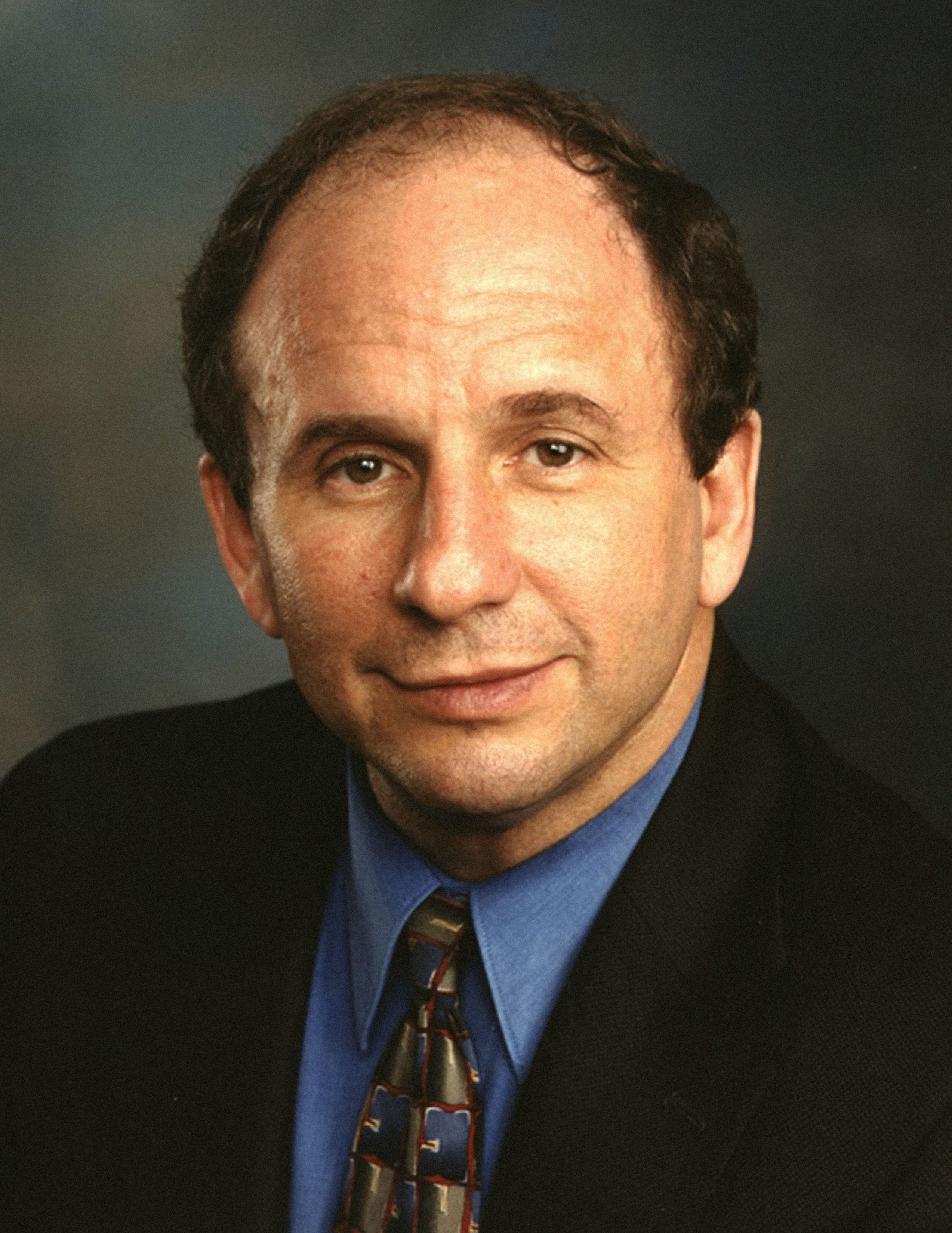
- Official portrait, c. 2002

United States Senator from Minnesota
- In office January 3, 1991 – October 25, 2002
- Preceded by: Rudy Boschwitz
- Succeeded by: Dean Barkley

Personal details
- Born: Paul David Wellstone; July 21, 1944 Washington, D.C., U.S.
- Died: October 25, 2002 (aged 58) St. Louis County, Minnesota, U.S.
- Cause of death: Airplane crash
- Resting place: Lakewood Cemetery
- Party: Democratic
- Spouse: Sheila Ison (m. 1963)
- Children: 3
- Education: University of North Carolina, Chapel Hill (BA, MA, PhD)
- Paul Wellstone's voice Wellstone introduces S.422, the Taconite Workers Relief Act of 2001; Recorded March 1, 2001

Paul David Wellstone (July 21, 1944 – October 25, 2002) was an American academic, author, and politician. He represented Minnesota in the United States Senate from 1991 until he was killed in a plane crash near Eveleth, Minnesota, in 2002, eleven days before that year's election for the seat. A member of the Democratic Party (DFL), Wellstone was a leader of the populist and progressive wings of the party.

Born in Washington, D.C., Wellstone grew up in Northern Virginia. He graduated from the University of North Carolina at Chapel Hill, earning a Bachelor's of Arts and a doctorate in political science. In 1969, Wellstone was hired as a professor at Carleton College in Northfield, Minnesota. He taught there until his election to the Senate in 1990. In addition, he also worked as a local activist and community organizer in rural Rice County. In 1982, he made his first bid for political office in the Minnesota State Auditor race, losing to Republican incumbent Arne Carlson.

Wellstone challenged two-term Republican incumbent Rudy Boschwitz in the 1990 United States Senate election. Wellstone was widely seen as an underdog and was significantly outspent by Boschwitz. Using his progressive populism and grassroots campaigning tactics, such as his iconic green school bus, Wellstone won in an upset victory that gained him national attention. He was the only challenger in the country that year to defeat an incumbent senator. In his 1996 reelection campaign, he defeated Boschwitz in a rematch. He won the elections with 50.4% and 50.3% of the vote, respectively.

While in the U.S. Senate, Wellstone was a supporter of environmental protection, labor groups, and health care reform. He notably authored the "Wellstone Amendment" for the Bipartisan Campaign Reform Act of 2002. However, his efforts toward campaign finance reform were overturned in 2010 by the U.S. Supreme Court in Citizens United v. Federal Election Commission.

Wellstone was a candidate for reelection to the Senate in 2002 and faced former Saint Paul mayor Norm Coleman in a competitive race. Ten days before the election, Wellstone died in a plane crash near Eveleth, Minnesota. His wife, Sheila, and daughter, Marcia, also died on board. After his death, Wellstone was replaced as the DFL nominee by former Vice President Walter Mondale, who lost to Coleman.

Wellstone's sons, David and Mark, were not on the flight. In their parents' honor, they founded and until 2018 co-chaired Wellstone Action, a nonprofit organization that trains progressive organizers.

== Background and education ==
Wellstone was born in Washington, D.C., the second son of Ukrainian Jewish immigrants Leon and Minnie Wellstone. They met and married in the United States. Their first son, Stephen, was born in 1936. Leon changed the family surname from Wexelstein after encountering severe antisemitism while living and working in Boston during the 1930s. The parents no longer practiced formal Judaism but raised Paul to understand the search for justice as the heart of their faith. Raised in Arlington, Virginia, Wellstone attended public schools. A gifted student, he had difficulty as a teenager in years after his brother suffered a breakdown and had to be hospitalized for a period. Wellstone found new focus and success when he became involved in wrestling. He attended Wakefield High School and Yorktown High School, graduating in 1962.

Wellstone attended the University of North Carolina at Chapel Hill (UNC) on a wrestling scholarship. In college he was an undefeated Atlantic Coast Conference wrestling champion. He graduated a year early with a Bachelor of Arts in political science in 1965, and was elected Phi Beta Kappa. In May 1969, Wellstone earned a PhD in political science from UNC. His doctoral dissertation on the roots of black militancy was titled Black Militants in the Ghetto: Why They Believe in Violence.

== Marriage and family ==
In 1963, after his freshman year, Wellstone married Sheila Ison. They had dated since high school but went to different colleges. She left the University of Kentucky and worked at UNC to support them while he pursued an accelerated schedule.

They had three children together: David, Mark, and Marcia.

== Early career and activism ==
In August 1969, Wellstone accepted a tenure-track position at Carleton College in Northfield, Minnesota. He taught political science until his election to the United States Senate in 1990.

During the 1970s and 1980s, Wellstone began community organizing with the working poor and other politically disenfranchised communities. He founded the Organization for a Better Rice County, a group consisting mainly of single parents on welfare. The organization advocated for public housing, affordable health care, improved public education, free school lunches, and a publicly funded daycare center. In 1978, Wellstone published his first book, How the Rural Poor Got Power: Narrative of a Grassroots Organizer, chronicling his work with the organization.

Wellstone was arrested twice during this period for civil disobedience. The Federal Bureau of Investigation began a case file on him after his May 1970 arrest for protesting the Vietnam War at the Federal Office Building (which was renamed the Paul D. Wellstone Federal Building in 2024) in Minneapolis. In 1984 Wellstone was arrested again, for trespassing during a foreclosure protest at a bank.

In the late 1970s, Wellstone was involved in the anti-power line movement against electric cooperatives in Minnesota. Then-governor Rudy Perpich asked University of Minnesota historian Hy Berman to get Wellstone to calm down, to which Wellstone reportedly replied, "Tell Rudy to go fuck himself". Perpich and Wellstone later became good friends.

Wellstone extended his activism to the Minnesota labor movement. In the summer of 1985, he walked the picket line with striking P-9ers during a labor dispute at the Hormel Meat Packing plant in Austin, Minnesota. The Minnesota National Guard was called in during the strike to ensure that Hormel could hire permanent replacement workers.

Carleton College's trustees briefly fired Wellstone in the mid-1970s for his activism and lack of academic publications. He received widespread support from students, and some held a sit-in. Wellstone formally challenged the trustees' failure to follow process of review. He gained an assessment by outside professors, who highly praised his teaching, organizing, and work. The trustees then rehired him and gave him tenure a year ahead of the standard schedule. Wellstone remains the youngest tenured faculty member in Carleton's history.

== Early political career ==
Wellstone first sought public office in 1982. He received the Democratic nomination for Minnesota State Auditor after an impassioned speech at the state convention. In the general election he received 45% of the vote, losing to Republican incumbent, and future Minnesota governor, Arne Carlson. Wellstone remained active in Democratic politics in the mid-1980s. He served as an elected committeeman for the Democratic National Committee in 1984, and in 1986 began a second campaign for State Auditor before dropping out to tend his mother's failing health. In 1988, Wellstone chaired Jesse Jackson's campaign for the presidency in Minnesota. After the primary, he co-chaired Michael Dukakis's campaign in the state.

== U.S. Senate campaigns (1990–2002) ==
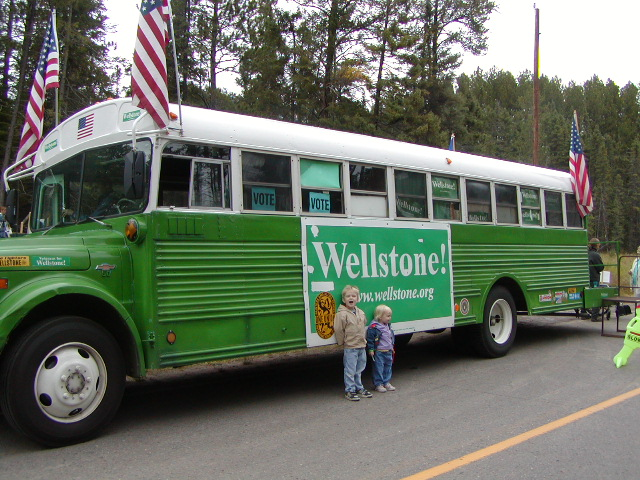
Wellstone's campaign bus

In 1990, Wellstone ran for the U.S. Senate against incumbent Rudy Boschwitz, beginning the race as a serious underdog. He narrowly won the election despite being outspent 7 to 1. Wellstone played off his underdog image with quirky, humorous ads created by political consultant Bill Hillsman, including "Fast Paul" and "Looking for Rudy", a pastiche of the 1989 Michael Moore documentary Roger & Me. Boschwitz was hurt by a letter his supporters wrote, on campaign stationery, to members of the Minnesota Jewish community days before the election, accusing Wellstone of being a "bad Jew" for marrying a Gentile and not raising his children in the Jewish faith. (Boschwitz, like Wellstone, is Jewish.) Wellstone's reply, widely broadcast on Minnesota television, was "He has a problem with Christians, then." Boschwitz was the only incumbent U.S. senator not to be reelected that year.

Wellstone defeated Boschwitz again in 1996. During that campaign, Boschwitz ran ads accusing Wellstone of being "embarrassingly liberal" and calling him "Senator Welfare". He accused Wellstone of supporting flag burning, a move some believe backfired. Before that accusation, the race was close, but Wellstone beat Boschwitz by nine points despite again being significantly outspent. Reform Party candidate Dean Barkley received 7% of the vote.

Wellstone's upset victory in 1990 and reelection in 1996 were also credited to a grassroots campaign that inspired college students, poor people, and minorities to get involved in politics, many for the first time. In 1990, the number of young people involved in the campaign was so notable that shortly after the election, Walter Mondale told Wellstone that "the kids won it for you". Wellstone had spent much of his Senate career working with the Hmong community in Minnesota, which had not previously been much involved in American politics, and with the veterans community—serving on the Senate Committee on Veterans' Affairs, where he successfully campaigned for atomic veterans to receive compensation from the federal government, and for increased spending on health care for veterans.

In 2002, Wellstone campaigned for reelection to a third term despite an earlier campaign pledge to serve only two. His Republican opponent was Norm Coleman, a two-term mayor of St. Paul and former Democrat. Earlier that year, Wellstone announced he had a mild form of multiple sclerosis, causing the limp he had believed was an old wrestling injury.

Wellstone was in a line of center-left senators from the Democratic-Farmer-Labor Party (DFL). The first three, Hubert Humphrey, Eugene McCarthy, and Walter Mondale, were all prominent in the national Democratic Party. Shortly after Wellstone joined the Senate, South Carolina Senator Fritz Hollings said to him, "You remind me of Hubert Humphrey. You talk too much."

== Presidential aspirations ==
Shortly after his reelection to the Senate in 1996, Wellstone began contemplating a run for his party's nomination for President of the United States in 2000. In May 1997, he embarked on a cross-country speaking and listening tour dubbed "The Children's Tour." It took him through rural areas of Mississippi and Appalachia and the inner cities of Minneapolis, Chicago, Los Angeles, and Baltimore. He intended to retrace the steps Robert F. Kennedy took during a similar tour in 1966.

Wellstone planned to highlight that conditions had improved slightly for African Americans since the height of the civil rights movement, but not much for poor whites, despite their receiving food stamps, gaining more government (mostly military) jobs, and the massive federal investment in their regions, especially Appalachia.

In 1998, Wellstone formed an exploratory committee and a leadership PAC, the Progressive Politics Network, that paid for his travels to Iowa and New Hampshire, two early primary states in the nomination process. He spoke before organized labor and local Democrats, using the slogan "I represent the democratic wing of the Democratic Party." Vermont governor Howard Dean later incorporated that phrase into his stump speech in the 2004 US presidential election.

On January 9, 1999, Wellstone called a press conference at the Minnesota State Capitol at which he said he lacked the stamina necessary for a national campaign, citing chronic back problems he ascribed to an old wrestling injury. His pain was later diagnosed as multiple sclerosis. He thereafter endorsed former Senator Bill Bradley of New Jersey, the only Democratic candidate to challenge Vice President Al Gore.

== Political positions ==
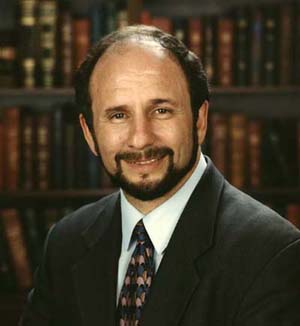
Official portrait, c. 1990s

Wellstone was known for his work for peace, the environment, labor, and health care; he also joined his wife Sheila to support the rights of victims of domestic violence. He made the issue of mental illness a central focus in his career. He was a supporter of immigration to the U.S. He opposed the first Gulf War in 1991 and, in the months before his death, spoke out against the government's threats to go to war again with Iraq. He was strongly supported by groups such as Americans for Democratic Action, the AFL–CIO, the Sierra Club, the American Civil Liberties Union, and People for the American Way. He was often called "the conscience of the Senate".

In 1996, Wellstone voted for the Defense of Marriage Act. He later asked his supporters to educate him on the issue; by 2001, when he wrote his autobiography, Conscience of a Liberal, Wellstone said that he had made a mistake in that vote.

Wellstone was one of only eight senators to vote against repealing the Glass–Steagall Act in 1999. In 2000, Wellstone introduced legislation to reinstate a drug pricing rule imposed during President George H. W. Bush's administration requiring that medicine developed with taxpayer funds be available at a reasonable price. President Bill Clinton's administration had repealed the rule.

After voting against the congressional authorization for the war in Iraq on October 11, 2002, during a tight reelection race, Wellstone reportedly told his wife, "I just cost myself the election". Vice President Dick Cheney reportedly threatened him before the vote, saying, "If you vote against the war in Iraq, the Bush administration will do whatever is necessary to get you. There will be severe ramifications for you and the state of Minnesota."

In the 2002 campaign, the Green Party ran a candidate against Wellstone, a move some Greens opposed. The party's 2000 vice-presidential nominee, Winona LaDuke, called Wellstone "a champion of the vast majority of our issues". Some liberals criticized the Green Party's decision to oppose Wellstone, as they believed it would cost him votes in a close election.

Wellstone was the author of the "Wellstone Amendment" to the McCain-Feingold Bill for campaign finance reform, in what came to be known as the Bipartisan Campaign Reform Act of 2002. The law, including the Wellstone Amendment, was called unconstitutional by groups and individuals of various political perspectives, including the California Democratic Party, the National Rifle Association of America, and Republican Senator Mitch McConnell, the Senate majority whip. On December 10, 2003, the Supreme Court upheld McCain-Feingold's key provisions, including the Wellstone Amendment. Wellstone called McCain-Feingold's protection of "advocacy" groups a "loophole" allowing "special interests" to run last-minute election ads. He pushed an amendment to extend McCain-Feingold's ban on last-minute ads to nonprofits like "the NRA, the Sierra Club, the Christian Coalition, and others". Under the Wellstone Amendment, these organizations could advertise using only money raised under strict "hard money" limits—no more than $5,000 per individual.

In January 2010, in Citizens United v. Federal Election Commission, the U.S. Supreme Court struck down the McCain-Feingold Act and removed restrictions on the NRA's and others' ability to campaign at election time.

=== Gulf War ===
Wellstone voted against authorizing the use of force before the Persian Gulf War on January 12, 1991 (the vote was 52–47 in favor). He also voted against the use of force before the Iraq War on October 11, 2002 (the vote was 77–23 in favor). Wellstone was one of 11 senators to vote against both the 1991 and 2002 resolutions. The others were also all Democrats: Daniel Akaka of Hawaii; Jeff Bingaman of New Mexico; Robert Byrd of West Virginia; Kent Conrad of North Dakota; Daniel Inouye of Hawaii; Ted Kennedy of Massachusetts; Patrick Leahy of Vermont; Carl Levin of Michigan; Barbara Mikulski of Maryland; and Paul Sarbanes of Maryland.

=== Other key military action votes ===
Wellstone supported requests for military action by President Bill Clinton, including Operation Restore Hope in Somalia (1992), Operation Uphold Democracy in Haiti (1994), Operation Deliberate Force in Bosnia and Herzegovina (1995), Operation Desert Fox in Iraq (1998), and Operation Allied Force in Yugoslavia (1999). On July 1, 1994, during the 100-day Rwandan genocide from April 6 to mid-July 1994, Wellstone authored an amendment to the 1995 defense appropriations bill.

== Death ==
On October 25, 2002, Wellstone, along with seven others, died in the crash of a chartered Beechcraft King Air in northeastern Minnesota, at 10:22 a.m. He was 58 years old. The other victims were his wife, Sheila; their daughter Marcia; the pilots, Richard Conry and Michael Guess; and campaign staffers Mary McEvoy, Tom Lapic and Will McLaughlin.

Autopsy reports determined that five of the passengers likely died instantly upon impact, while three others—McEvoy, Lapic, and McLaughlin—showed signs of smoke inhalation from the ensuing fire. The airplane was en route to Eveleth, where Wellstone was to attend the funeral of Martin Rukavina, a steelworker whose son Tom Rukavina served in the Minnesota House of Representatives. Wellstone had decided to go to the funeral instead of a Minneapolis rally and fundraiser attended by Mondale and fellow Senator Ted Kennedy. He was to debate Republican nominee Norm Coleman in Duluth, Minnesota, that night.

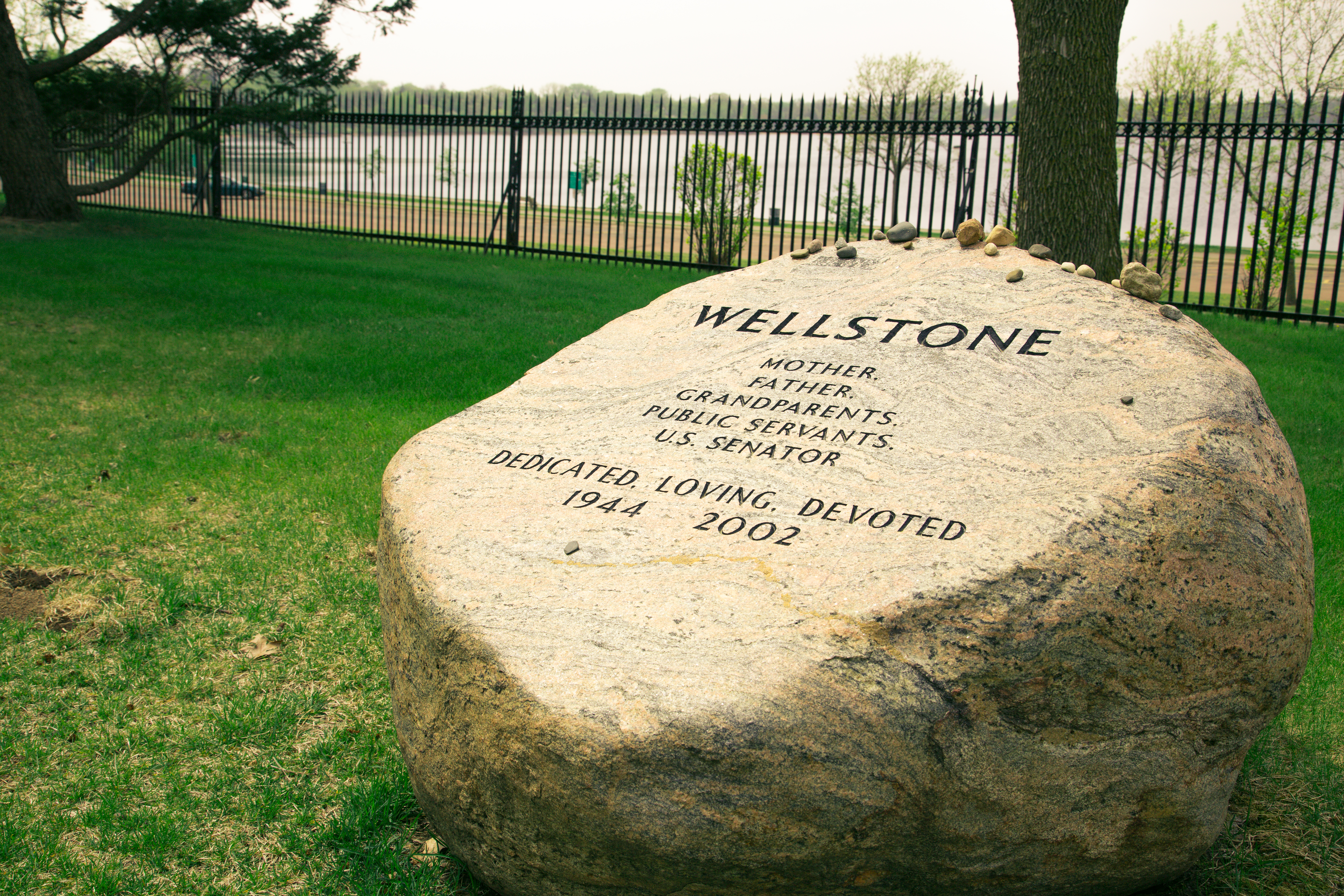
Paul and Sheila Wellstone memorial, Lakewood Cemetery, Minneapolis, Minnesota

=== Airplane crash ===
The aircraft, a Beechcraft King Air A100, crashed into dense forest about two miles from the Eveleth airport, while pilots were operating under instrument flight rules. It had no flight data recorders. Autopsy toxicology results on both pilots were negative for drug or alcohol use. Icing, though initially widely reported, was eventually rejected as a significant factor in the crash. The National Transportation Safety Board (NTSB) judged that while cloud cover might have prevented the flight crew from seeing the airport, icing did not affect the plane's performance during its descent.

The Federal Bureau of Investigation (FBI) initially sent agents to help recover debris. It later investigated possible foul play in the crash. After a few days, it determined that the crash was accidental. It had followed several criminal leads involving death threats, as Wellstone had been receiving them since he took office. The FBI had tapped his phone to locate the callers. Documents about the FBI's involvement in investigating Wellstone's death were not publicly released until 2010. Government documents also indicated that the FBI had been following Wellstone since before he became a senator, and included records dating as far back as his arrest at a 1970 antiwar protest.

The National Transportation Safety Board (NTSB) later determined that the crash's likely cause was "the flight crew's failure to maintain adequate airspeed, which led to an aerodynamic stall from which they did not recover". The last two radar readings detected the plane traveling at or just below its predicted stall speed given conditions at the time. Aviation experts speculated the pilots might have lost situational awareness because they were lost and looking for the airport. They had been off course for several minutes and "clicked on" the runway lights, something not usually done in good visibility. There was a problem with the airport's VHF omnidirectional range (VOR) navigational beacon.

According to Minnesota Public Radio:

The day after the crash, FAA pilots tested the VOR. The inspection pilots reported to the NTSB that when they flew the approach without their automatic pilot engaged, the VOR repeatedly brought them about a mile south of the airport. In one written statement an FAA pilot told the NTSB that the signal guided him 1 to 2 miles left or south of the runway. That's the same direction Wellstone's plane was heading when it crashed.

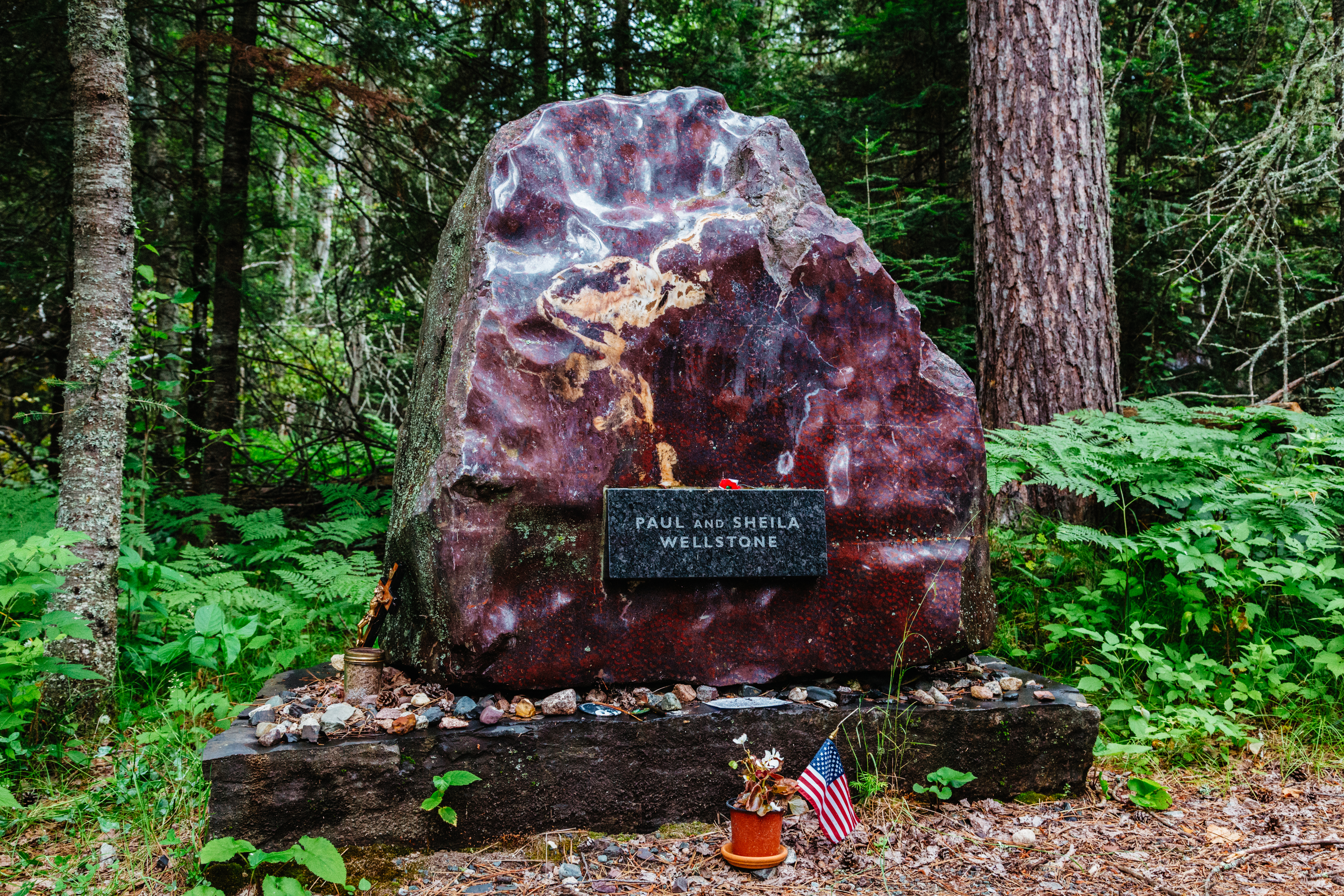
The Paul Wellstone Memorial and Historic Site near Eveleth, Minnesota.

Other pilots at the charter company raised questions about the pilots. They told the NTSB that pilot Richard Conry and first officer (co-pilot) Michael Guess had both displayed below-average flying skills. Conry had a well-known tendency to allow copilots to take over all aircraft functions as if they were the sole pilot. After the crash, three copilots told of occasions on which they had to take control of the aircraft away from Conry. After one of those incidents, three days before the crash, the copilot (not Guess) had urged Conry to retire. In a post-accident interview, Conry's longtime friend and fellow aviator Timothy Cooney said that he had last spoken to Conry in June 2001 and had expressed concern about difficulties he had flying King Airs as late as April of that year, 18 months before the crash.

Significant discrepancies were also found in the captain's flight logs in the course of the post-accident investigation, indicating that he might have greatly exaggerated his flying experience. Most of it had been accrued before a 9- to 10-year hiatus from flying due to a fraud conviction and poor eyesight. Conry underwent LASIK surgery, but it had improved his vision to only 20/50 or 20/30. FAA regulations required Conry to wear corrective lenses, but his wife and Cooney said Conry did not do so after the surgery. The coroner who examined his body was unable to determine whether Conry was wearing contact lenses at the time of the crash.

Coworkers described Guess as having had to be consistently reminded to keep his hand on the throttle and maintain airspeed during approaches. He had two previous piloting jobs, one with Skydive Hutchinson as a pilot (1988–1989), and another with Northwest Airlines as a trainee instructor (1999). He was dismissed from both for poor performance. Conry's widow told the NTSB that her husband told her "the other pilots thought Guess was not a good pilot".

== Aftermath ==
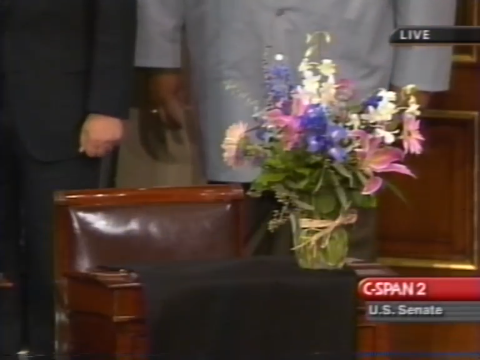
Flowers adorn Wellstone's desk in the U.S. Senate chamber, October 28, 2002

Wellstone died 11 days before his potential reelection in a race crucial to national efforts to maintain Democratic Party control of the Senate. Campaigning halted on all sides. Minnesota law required that his name be stricken from the ballot, to be replaced by a candidate chosen by the party. The DFL selected former Vice President Walter Mondale.

The memorial service for Wellstone and the other victims of the crash was held on October 29, 2002, in Williams Arena at the University of Minnesota. It was also broadcast live on national TV. The lengthy service was dotted with political speeches and open advocacy on political issues. A giant beach ball was batted around the crowd in the style of a beach party. Many high-profile politicians attended the memorial, including former President Bill Clinton, former Vice President Al Gore, and more than half the U.S. Senate. The White House offered to send Vice President Dick Cheney to the service, but the Wellstone family declined.

Some criticized the service for having an inappropriate tone and resembling a "pep rally" or "partisan foot-stomp". Wellstone's campaign manager Jeff Blodgett noted after the event that it had not been scripted. He apologized to people who were offended or surprised by it.

In his 2003 book Lies and the Lying Liars Who Tell Them, Al Franken wrote that "reasonable people of good will were genuinely offended" but also that conservative media figures had exploited outrage about the event for political gain in the 2002 election. When he published his book, Franken was a comedian and liberal commentator. Five years later, he entered politics, and in 2008 Franken was elected to the Senate seat Wellstone had held.

Minnesota Governor Jesse Ventura, who had initially said he preferred to appoint a Democrat to serve the remainder of Wellstone's term, was "disgusted" by the memorial event. He walked out and later threatened to appoint "an ordinary citizen" instead. On November 4, the day before the election, Ventura appointed state planning commissioner Dean Barkley, founder and chair of Ventura's Independence Party of Minnesota, to serve the remaining two months of Wellstone's term. Barkley had run against Wellstone in 1996.

In the 2002 election, Coleman received 49.5% of the vote, defeating Mondale. In 2008, he was narrowly defeated (by 312 votes) in his bid for reelection by Franken, in a three-way race that included Barkley.

== Legacy ==
In their parents' honor, David and Mark Wellstone co-founded Wellstone Action, a nonprofit devoted to progressive goals and training for community organizing. They served as co-chairs until 2018. Their father's campaign manager, Jeff Blodgett, served as executive director. Tim Walz, future Minnesota governor and vice-presidential nominee, is an alumnus of their training.

The AFL–CIO created the AFL–CIO Senator Paul Wellstone Award for supporters of the rights of labor unions. In January 2003, presidential candidate Howard Dean and California state senator John Burton received the first award. In 2012, the DFL established the similarly named Paul D. Wellstone Award for Lifetime Commitment to Organized Labor.

In 2004, the University of North Carolina at Chapel Hill dedicated the Paul and Sheila Wellstone Memorial Garden as a tribute to the couple, both alumni of the university. Also in 2004, Mason Jennings released "The Ballad of Paul and Sheila", a song memorializing the Wellstones, on his album Use Your Voice.

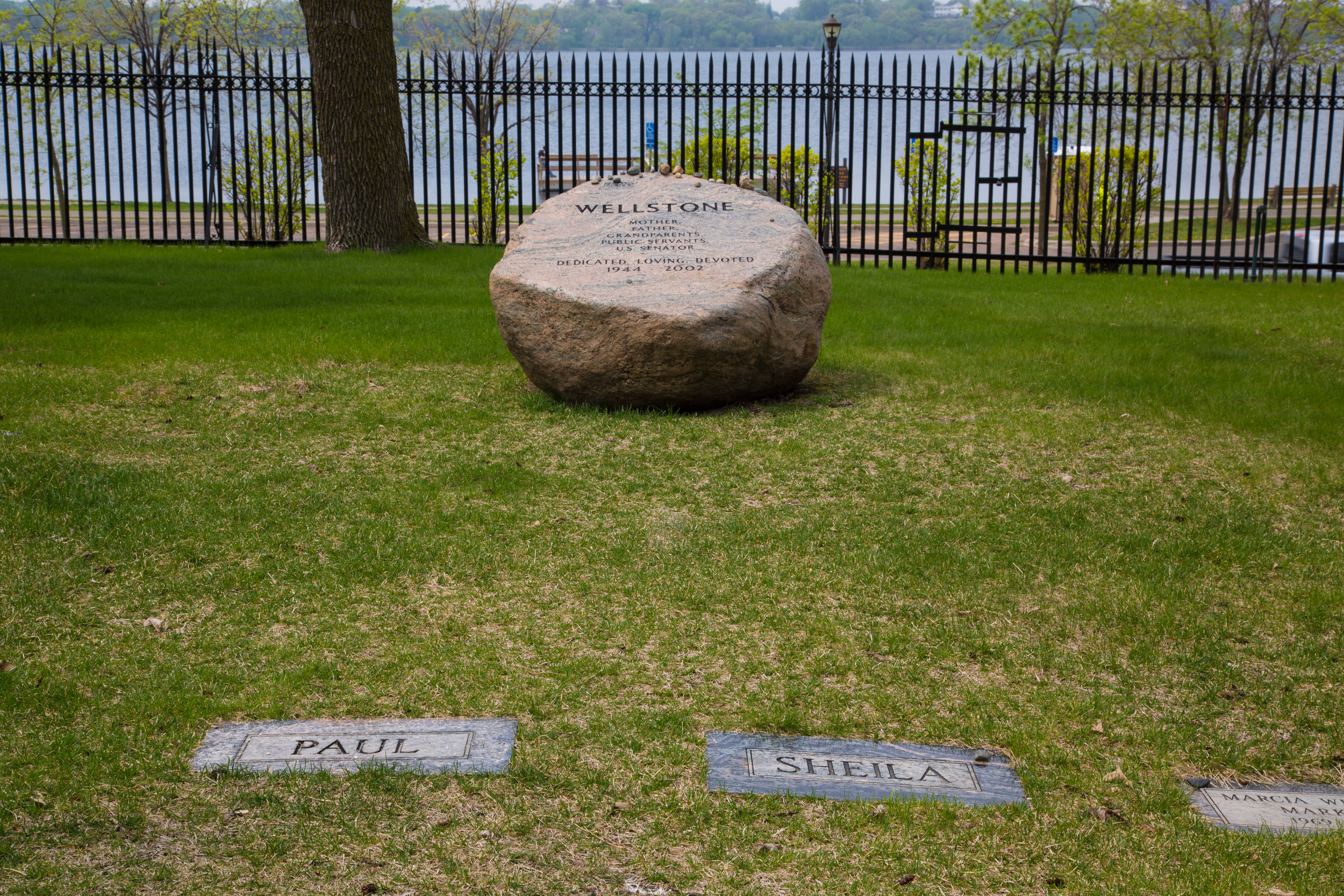
Wellstone family grave markers: (L to R), Paul, Sheila, and Marcia.

On September 25, 2005, a memorial to the Wellstones was dedicated near the plane crash site. Hundreds of supporters and loved ones were present, and staffers had arranged to bring his distinctive green campaign bus. The six-acre site, off Bodas Road near Eveleth, is a tribute to Wellstone's life and career, and to his family members and staff who died in the crash. The memorial is about three-quarters of a mile from the crash site, which is on private land. It is divided into three parts: the Legacy Trail, the Commemorative Circle, and the Crash Site Narrative Space.

Paul, Sheila, and Marcia Wellstone are buried at Lakewood Cemetery in Minneapolis. A memorial sculpture near Bde Maka Ska marks their grave sites. Visitors sometimes follow the Jewish custom of placing small stones on the boulder marking the family plot or on the individual markers.

Wellstone Action, a nonprofit, nonpartisan organization, trains citizens and potential candidates with a progressive agenda.

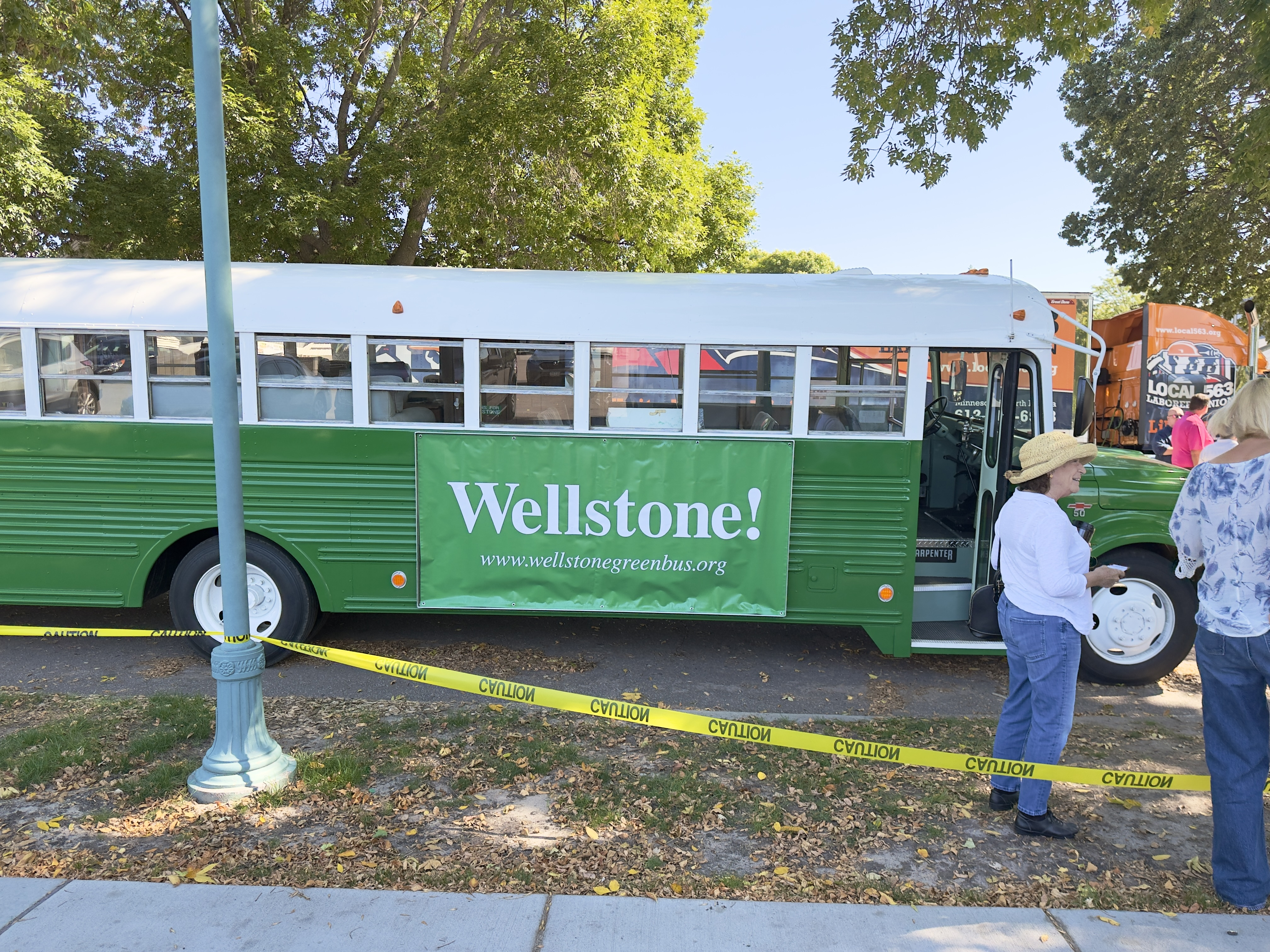
Wellstone green bus in 2025.

In 2007, former First Lady Rosalynn Carter joined their son David Wellstone to push Congress to pass legislation regarding mental health insurance.

David Wellstone and Carter worked to pass the Paul Wellstone and Pete Domenici Mental Health Parity and Addiction Equity Act of 2008, which requires equal coverage of mental and physical illnesses when policies include both types of coverage; both testified about the bill before a House subcommittee in 2007. David said of his father, "Although he was passionate on many issues, there was not another issue that surpassed this in terms of his passion." Because Paul Wellstone's brother Stephen had had mental illness, Wellstone had fought for changes in mental health and insurance laws when he reached the Senate.

The St. Paul branch of the Emily Program eating disorder clinic has a Wellstone Room in its adult inpatient unit. The room is dedicated to Paul and Sheila Wellstone for their work on treating eating disorders.

On March 5, 2008, the House of Representatives passed H.R. 1424, the Paul Wellstone Mental Health and Addiction Equity Act of 2007, by a vote of 268–148. It was sponsored by Representatives Patrick Kennedy and Jim Ramstad, both of whom are recovering alcoholics. The narrower Senate bill S. 558, passed earlier, was introduced by Kennedy's father, Senator Edward Kennedy, Pete Domenici, and Mike Enzi.

== Electoral history ==
1996 Minnesota U.S. Senate election
Party	Candidate	Votes	%	±%
Democratic	Paul Wellstone (incumbent)	1,098,430	50.32%	−0.12%
Republican	Rudy Boschwitz	901,194	41.28%	−6.53%
Reform	Dean Barkley	152,328	6.98%	n/a
Majority		197,236	9.04%	

1990 Minnesota U.S. Senate election
Party	Candidate	Votes	%	±%
Democratic	Paul Wellstone	911,999	50.44%	+9%
Republican	Rudy Boschwitz (incumbent)	864,375	47.81%	−10%
Majority		47,624	2.63%	

1982 Minnesota State Auditor election
Party	Candidate	Votes	%	±%
Republican	Arne Carlson (incumbent)	932,925	54.81%	+3.0%
Democratic	Paul Wellstone	769,254	45.19%	−1.5%
Majority			10%	

== See also ==
- List of members of the United States Congress who died in office (2000–present) § 2000s

== General and cited references ==
- Human Performance 14: Factual Report of Human Performance Specialist, National Transportation Safety Board (February 20, 2003)
- Attachment 1: Interview Summaries—part of the crash report(s)

Party political offices
Preceded by Joan Growe	Democratic nominee for U.S. Senator from Minnesota (Class 2); 1990, 1996, 2002 (died)	Succeeded by Walter Mondale
U.S. Senate
Preceded by Rudy Boschwitz	U.S. Senator (Class 2) from Minnesota; 1991–2002; Served alongside: David Durenberger, Rod Grams, Mark Dayton	Succeeded by Dean Barkley
