= Sheila Wellstone =

American politician (1944-2002)

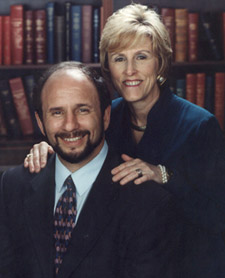
Wellstone with her husband, c. 1990s

Sheila Ison Wellstone (August 18, 1944 – October 25, 2002) was the wife of and advisor to United States Senator Paul Wellstone. She was an advocate for various causes, particularly prevention of domestic violence. She and their daughter Marcia died in a plane crash with him. Their two sons were not on the flight.

Sheila Ison was born and raised in Kentucky, where she grew up in a middle-class Southern Baptist family, with two siblings. (Her grandparents were coal miners.)

She was a high school junior when her family moved to Washington, D.C. At the age of sixteen, she met and started dating her future husband Paul Wellstone. She attended the University of Kentucky, but dropped out at the age of nineteen to marry Paul, then a student at the University of North Carolina at Chapel Hill.

His family was Jewish and his parents were not at first enthusiastic at the prospect of a Christian daughter-in-law. Her parents were members of a country club that had no Jewish members, but the Wellstone parents withdrew their objections to the match.

After her husband finished his PhD in political science, he accepted an offer to teach at Carleton College in Northfield, Minnesota, and the couple moved to the state in 1969. The couple had three children, David, Mark, and Marcia.

While in Minnesota, Wellstone worked as a librarian at Northfield High School. She left that position upon her husband's successful campaign to become a U.S. Senator in 1990. She became an advocate for human rights, the environment, and peace. Wellstone focused much of her work on domestic violence, assisting survivors and pursuing policies to support its prevention. In late 2000, she was listed in one news story as a possible candidate for U.S. Senate or Governor of Minnesota in 2002, but she did not run.

While campaigning with her husband in his 2002 re-election campaign, she died in a plane crash near Eveleth, Minnesota, along with him and their daughter Marcia. They were buried at Lakewood Cemetery. The Sheila Wellstone Institute continues her commitment to building power and visibility to ensure that ending violence against women and children is a national priority.
