= List of United States Senate elections (1914–present) =

The United States Senate is the upper chamber of the United States Congress. Senators have been directly elected by state-wide popular vote since the Seventeenth Amendment to the United States Constitution in 1913. A senate term is six years with no term limit. Every two years a third of the seats are up for election. Some years also have a few special elections to fill vacancies. Each state has two senators elected in different years. There were 96 senators from 1912 to 1959 and 100 since then. The Senate has been dominated by Democrats (D) and Republicans (R) in the whole period.

== Key ==
Key
C_{#}	Conservative
D_{#}	Democratic
FL_{#}	Farmer–Labor
I_{#}	Independent
ID_{#}	Independent Democratic
P_{#}	Progressive
R_{#}	Republican
V_{#}	Vacant

Seats on election are shown in bold.
Re-elected: The sitting senator is elected for another term.
Hold: A new candidate from the same party is elected.
Gain: The party did not have the seat before.

Consider for example the Democrats (D) in 1914:

- 36 sitting Democrats (D_{1} to D_{36}) were not on election.
- 14 sitting Democrats (D_{37} to D_{50}) were re-elected (D_{50} had been appointed to fill a vacancy and is shown as an elected hold).
- 3 new Democrats (D_{51} to D_{53}) held seats by replacing other Democrats.
- 3 new Democrats (D_{54} to D_{56}) gained seats the Democrats did not have before.

== 1914 ==
		D_{1}	D_{2}	D_{3}	D_{4}	D_{5}	D_{6}	D_{7}	D_{8}
D_{18}	D_{17}	D_{16}	D_{15}	D_{14}	D_{13}	D_{12}	D_{11}	D_{10}	D_{9}
D_{19}	D_{20}	D_{21}	D_{22}	D_{23}	D_{24}	D_{25}	D_{26}	D_{27}	D_{28}
**D_{38} Re-elected**	**D_{37} Re-elected**	D_{36}	D_{35}	D_{34}	D_{33}	D_{32}	D_{31}	D_{30}	D_{29}
**D_{39} Re-elected**	**D_{40} Re-elected**	**D_{41} Re-elected**	**D_{42} Re-elected**	**D_{43} Re-elected**	**D_{44} Re-elected**	**D_{45} Re-elected**	**D_{46} Re-elected**	**D_{47} Re-elected**	**D_{48} Re-elected**
**Majority →**									**D_{49} Re-elected**
**R_{39} Hold**	P_{1}	**D_{56} Gain**	**D_{55} Gain**	**D_{54} Gain**	**D_{53} Hold**	**D_{52} Hold**	**D_{51} Hold**	**D_{50} Elected (Note: Appointee elected) Hold**	**D_{49} Re-elected**
**R_{38} Hold**	**R_{37} Hold**	**R_{36} Re-elected**	**R_{35} Re-elected**	**R_{34} Re-elected**	**R_{33} Re-elected**	**R_{32} Re-elected**	**R_{31} Re-elected**	**R_{30} Re-elected**	**R_{29} Re-elected**
R_{19}	R_{20}	R_{21}	R_{22}	R_{23}	R_{24}	R_{25}	R_{26}	**R_{27} Re-elected**	**R_{28} Re-elected**
R_{18}	R_{17}	R_{16}	R_{15}	R_{14}	R_{13}	R_{12}	R_{11}	R_{10}	R_{9}
		R_{1}	R_{2}	R_{3}	R_{4}	R_{5}	R_{6}	R_{7}	R_{8}

== 1916 ==
		D_{1}	D_{2}	D_{3}	D_{4}	D_{5}	D_{6}	D_{7}	D_{8}
D_{18}	D_{17}	D_{16}	D_{15}	D_{14}	D_{13}	D_{12}	D_{11}	D_{10}	D_{9}
D_{19}	D_{20}	D_{21}	D_{22}	D_{23}	D_{24}	D_{25}	D_{26}	D_{27}	D_{28}
**D_{38} Re-elected**	D_{37}	D_{36}	D_{35}	D_{34}	D_{33}	D_{32}	D_{31}	D_{30}	D_{29}
**D_{39} Re-elected**	**D_{40} Re-elected**	**D_{41} Re-elected**	**D_{42} Re-elected**	**D_{43} Re-elected**	**D_{44} Re-elected**	**D_{45} Re-elected**	**D_{46} Re-elected**	**D_{47} Hold**	**D_{48} Hold**
**Majority →**									**D_{49} Hold**
**R_{39} Gain**	**R_{40} Gain**	**R_{41} Gain**	**R_{42} Gain**	**D_{54} Gain**	**D_{53} Gain**	**D_{52} Gain**	**D_{51} Gain**	**D_{50} Gain**	**D_{49} Hold**
**R_{38} Gain**	**R_{37} Gain**	**R_{36} Gain**	**R_{35} Hold**	**R_{34} Hold**	**R_{33} Hold**	**R_{32} Hold**	**R_{31} Re-elected**	**R_{30} Re-elected**	**R_{29} Re-elected**
R_{19}	R_{20}	R_{21}	R_{22}	R_{23}	R_{24}	**R_{25} Re-elected**	**R_{26} Re-elected**	**R_{27} Re-elected**	**R_{28} Re-elected**
R_{18}	R_{17}	R_{16}	R_{15}	R_{14}	R_{13}	R_{12}	R_{11}	R_{10}	R_{9}
		R_{1}	R_{2}	R_{3}	R_{4}	R_{5}	R_{6}	R_{7}	R_{8}

== 1918 ==
		D_{1}	D_{2}	D_{3}	D_{4}	D_{5}	D_{6}	D_{7}	D_{8}
D_{18}	D_{17}	D_{16}	D_{15}	D_{14}	D_{13}	D_{12}	D_{11}	D_{10}	D_{9}
D_{19}	D_{20}	D_{21}	D_{22}	D_{23}	D_{24}	D_{25}	D_{26}	D_{27}	D_{28}
**D_{38} Re-elected**	**D_{37} Re-elected**	**D_{36} Re-elected**	**D_{35} Re-elected**	**D_{34} Re-elected**	**D_{33} Re-elected**	**D_{32} Re-elected**	**D_{31} Re-elected**	D_{30}	D_{29}
**D_{39} Re-elected**	**D_{40} Elected**	**D_{41} Elected**	**D_{42} Hold**	**D_{43} Hold**	**D_{44} Hold**	**D_{45} Hold**	**D_{46} Hold**	**D_{47} Gain**	**R_{49} Gain**
**Majority →**									**R_{49} Gain**
**R_{39} Hold**	**R_{40} Hold**	**R_{41} Hold**	**R_{42} Hold**	**R_{43} Gain**	**R_{44} Gain**	**R_{45} Gain**	**R_{46} Gain**	**R_{47} Gain**	**R_{48} Gain**
**R_{38} Hold**	**R_{37} Re-elected**	**R_{36} Re-elected**	**R_{35} Re-elected**	**R_{34} Re-elected**	**R_{33} Re-elected**	**R_{32} Re-elected**	**R_{31} Re-elected**	**R_{30} Re-elected**	**R_{29} Re-elected**
R_{19}	R_{20}	R_{21}	R_{22}	R_{23}	R_{24}	R_{25}	R_{26}	R_{27}	R_{28}
R_{18}	R_{17}	R_{16}	R_{15}	R_{14}	R_{13}	R_{12}	R_{11}	R_{10}	R_{9}
		R_{1}	R_{2}	R_{3}	R_{4}	R_{5}	R_{6}	R_{7}	R_{8}

== 1920 ==
		D_{1}	D_{2}	D_{3}	D_{4}	D_{5}	D_{6}	D_{7}	D_{8}
D_{18}	D_{17}	D_{16}	D_{15}	D_{14}	D_{13}	D_{12}	D_{11}	D_{10}	D_{9}
D_{19}	D_{20}	D_{21}	D_{22}	D_{23}	D_{24}	D_{25}	D_{26}	D_{27}	D_{28}
**R_{59} Gain**	**D_{37} Hold**	**D_{36} Hold**	**D_{35} Hold**	**D_{34} Hold**	**D_{33} Elected**	**D_{32} Re-elected**	**D_{31} Re-elected**	**D_{30} Re-elected**	**D_{29} Re-elected**
**R_{58} Gain**	**R_{57} Gain**	**R_{56} Gain**	**R_{55} Gain**	**R_{54} Gain**	**R_{53} Gain**	**R_{52} Gain**	**R_{51} Gain**	**R_{50} Gain**	**R_{49} Gain**
**Majority →**									**R_{49} Gain**
**R_{39} Re-elected**	**R_{40} Re-elected**	**R_{41} Re-elected**	**R_{42} Re-elected**	**R_{43} Re-elected**	**R_{44} Re-elected**	**R_{45} Re-elected**	**R_{46} Hold**	**R_{47} Hold**	**R_{48} Hold**
**R_{38} Re-elected**	**R_{37} Re-elected**	**R_{36} Re-elected**	**R_{35} Re-elected**	R_{34}	R_{33}	R_{32}	R_{31}	R_{30}	R_{29}
R_{19}	R_{20}	R_{21}	R_{22}	R_{23}	R_{24}	R_{25}	R_{26}	R_{27}	R_{28}
R_{18}	R_{17}	R_{16}	R_{15}	R_{14}	R_{13}	R_{12}	R_{11}	R_{10}	R_{9}
		R_{1}	R_{2}	R_{3}	R_{4}	R_{5}	R_{6}	R_{7}	R_{8}

== 1922 ==
		D_{1}	D_{2}	D_{3}	D_{4}	D_{5}	D_{6}	D_{7}	D_{8}
D_{18}	D_{17}	D_{16}	D_{15}	D_{14}	D_{13}	D_{12}	D_{11}	D_{10}	D_{9}
D_{19}	D_{20}	**D_{21} Re-elected**	**D_{22} Gain (Note: Appointee defeated) Re-elected**	**D_{23} Re-elected**	**D_{24} Hold**	**D_{25}Gain**	**D_{26}Gain**	**D_{27} Gain**	**D_{28} Hold**
**D_{38} Re-elected**	**D_{37} Hold**	**D_{36} Re-elected**	**D_{35} Re-elected**	**D_{34} Re-elected**	**D_{33} Re-elected**	**D_{32} Gain**	**D_{31} Hold**	**D_{30} Hold**	**D_{29} Re-elected**
**D_{39} Re-elected**	**D_{40} Gain**	**D_{41} Gain**	**D_{42} Re-elected**	**FL_{1} Gain**	**R_{53} Gain**	**R_{52} Gain**	**R_{51} Hold**	**R_{50} Hold**	**R_{49} Hold**
**Majority →**									**R_{49} Hold**
R_{39}	R_{40}	R_{41}	**R_{42} Re-elected**	**R_{43} Re-elected**	**R_{44} Re-elected**	**R_{45} Re-elected**	**R_{46} Re-elected**	**R_{47} Elected Re-elected**	**R_{48} Elected**
R_{38}	R_{37}	R_{36}	R_{35}	R_{34}	R_{33}	R_{32}	R_{31}	R_{30}	R_{29}
R_{19}	R_{20}	R_{21}	R_{22}	R_{23}	R_{24}	R_{25}	R_{26}	R_{27}	R_{28}
R_{18}	R_{17}	R_{16}	R_{15}	R_{14}	R_{13}	R_{12}	R_{11}	R_{10}	R_{9}
		R_{1}	R_{2}	R_{3}	R_{4}	R_{5}	R_{6}	R_{7}	R_{8}

== 1924 ==
		D_{1}	D_{2}	D_{3}	D_{4}	D_{5}	D_{6}	D_{7}	D_{8}
D_{18}	D_{17}	D_{16}	D_{15}	D_{14}	D_{13}	D_{12}	D_{11}	D_{10}	D_{9}
D_{19}	D_{20}	D_{21}	D_{22}	D_{23}	D_{24}	D_{25}	D_{26}	D_{27}	D_{28}
**D_{38} Hold**	**D_{37} Re-elected**	**D_{36} Re-elected**	**D_{35} Re-elected**	**D_{34} Re-elected**	**D_{33} Re-elected**	**D_{32} Re-elected**	**D_{31} Re-elected**	**D_{30} Re-elected**	**D_{29} Re-elected**
**D_{39} Hold**	**D_{40} Gain**	FL_{1}	**R_{55} Gain**	**R_{54} Gain**	**R_{53} Gain**	**R_{52} Gain**	**R_{51} Gain**	**R_{50} Hold**	**R_{49} Hold**
**Majority →**									**R_{49} Hold**
**R_{39} Re-elected**	**R_{40} Re-elected**	**R_{41} Re-elected**	**R_{42} Re-elected**	**R_{43} Re-elected**	**R_{44} Elected Re-elected**	**R_{45} Elected Re-elected**	**R_{46} Hold**	**R_{47} Hold**	**R_{48} Hold**
**R_{38} Re-elected**	**R_{37} Re-elected**	**R_{36} Re-elected**	**R_{35} Re-elected**	**R_{34} Re-elected**	R_{33}	R_{32}	R_{31}	R_{30}	R_{29}
R_{19}	R_{20}	R_{21}	R_{22}	R_{23}	R_{24}	R_{25}	R_{26}	R_{27}	R_{28}
R_{18}	R_{17}	R_{16}	R_{15}	R_{14}	R_{13}	R_{12}	R_{11}	R_{10}	R_{9}
		R_{1}	R_{2}	R_{3}	R_{4}	R_{5}	R_{6}	R_{7}	R_{8}

== 1926 ==
		D_{1}	D_{2}	D_{3}	D_{4}	D_{5}	D_{6}	D_{7}	D_{8}
D_{18}	D_{17}	D_{16}	D_{15}	D_{14}	D_{13}	D_{12}	D_{11}	D_{10}	D_{9}
D_{19}	D_{20}	D_{21}	D_{22}	D_{23}	D_{24}	D_{25}	D_{26}	D_{27}	D_{28}
**D_{38} Re-elected**	**D_{37} Re-elected**	**D_{36} Re-elected**	**D_{35} Re-elected**	**D_{34} Re-elected**	**D_{33} Re-elected**	D_{32}	D_{31}	D_{30}	D_{29}
**D_{39} Hold**	**D_{40} Gain**	**D_{41} Gain**	**D_{42} Gain**	**D_{43} Gain**	**D_{44} Gain**	**D_{45} Gain**	FL_{1}	**R_{50} Ran**	**R_{49} Hold**
**Majority →**									**R_{49} Hold**
**R_{39} Re-elected**	**R_{40} Re-elected**	**R_{41} Re-elected**	**R_{42} Re-elected**	**R_{43} Re-elected**	**R_{44} Re-elected**	**R_{45} Hold**	**R_{46} Hold**	**R_{47} Hold**	**R_{48} Hold**
**R_{38} Re-elected**	**R_{37} Re-elected**	**R_{36} Re-elected**	**R_{35} Re-elected**	**R_{34} Re-elected**	**R_{33} Re-elected**	**R_{32} Re-elected**	R_{31}	R_{30}	R_{29}
R_{19}	R_{20}	R_{21}	R_{22}	R_{23}	R_{24}	R_{25}	R_{26}	R_{27}	R_{28}
R_{18}	R_{17}	R_{16}	R_{15}	R_{14}	R_{13}	R_{12}	R_{11}	R_{10}	R_{9}
		R_{1}	R_{2}	R_{3}	R_{4}	R_{5}	R_{6}	R_{7}	R_{8}

== 1928 ==
		D_{1}	D_{2}	D_{3}	D_{4}	D_{5}	D_{6}	D_{7}	D_{8}
D_{18}	D_{17}	D_{16}	D_{15}	D_{14}	D_{13}	D_{12}	D_{11}	D_{10}	D_{9}
D_{19}	D_{20}	D_{21}	D_{22}	D_{23}	D_{24}	D_{25}	D_{26}	D_{27}	**D_{28} Re-elected**
**D_{38} Re-elected**	**D_{37} Re-elected**	**D_{36} Re-elected**	**D_{35} Re-elected**	**D_{34} Re-elected**	**D_{33} Re-elected**	**D_{32} Re-elected**	**D_{31} Re-elected**	**D_{30} Re-elected**	**D_{29} Re-elected**
**D_{39} Re-elected**	**D_{40} Hold**	**FL_{1} Re-elected**	V_{1}	V_{2}	**R_{53} Gain**	**R_{52} Gain**	**R_{51} Gain**	**R_{50} Gain**	**R_{49} Gain**
**Majority →**									**R_{48} Gain**
**R_{39} Re-elected**	**R_{40} Re-elected**	**R_{41} Re-elected**	**R_{42} Re-elected**	**R_{43} Re-elected**	**R_{44} Re-elected**	**R_{45} Elected**	**R_{46} Elected**	**R_{47} Hold**	**R_{48} Gain**
**R_{38} Re-elected**	**R_{37} Re-elected**	**R_{36} Re-elected**	R_{35}	R_{34}	R_{33}	R_{32}	R_{31}	R_{30}	R_{29}
R_{19}	R_{20}	R_{21}	R_{22}	R_{23}	R_{24}	R_{25}	R_{26}	R_{27}	R_{28}
R_{18}	R_{17}	R_{16}	R_{15}	R_{14}	R_{13}	R_{12}	R_{11}	R_{10}	R_{9}
		R_{1}	R_{2}	R_{3}	R_{4}	R_{5}	R_{6}	R_{7}	R_{8}

== 1930 ==
		D_{1}	D_{2}	D_{3}	D_{4}	D_{5}	D_{6}	D_{7}	D_{8}
D_{18}	D_{17}	D_{16}	D_{15}	D_{14}	D_{13}	D_{12}	D_{11}	D_{10}	D_{9}
D_{19}	D_{20}	D_{21}	D_{22}	D_{23}	D_{24}	D_{25}	D_{26}	**D_{27} Re-elected**	**D_{28} Re-elected**
**D_{38} Hold**	**D_{37} Hold**	**D_{36} Hold**	**D_{35} Hold**	**D_{34} Hold**	**D_{33} Re-elected**	**D_{32} Re-elected**	**D_{31} Re-elected**	**D_{30} Re-elected**	**D_{29} Re-elected**
**D_{39} Gain**	**D_{40} Gain**	**D_{41} Gain**	**D_{42} Gain**	**D_{43} Gain**	**D_{44} Gain**	**D_{45} Gain**	FL_{1}	**R_{50} Gain**	**R_{49} Hold**
**Majority →**									**R_{49} Hold**
**R_{39} Re-elected**	**R_{40} Re-elected**	**R_{41} Re-elected**	**R_{42} Re-elected**	**R_{43} Re-elected**	**R_{44} Re-elected**	**R_{45} Re-elected**	**R_{46} Re-elected**	**R_{47} Hold**	**R_{48} Hold**
**R_{38} Re-elected**	R_{37}	R_{36}	R_{35}	R_{34}	R_{33}	R_{32}	R_{31}	R_{30}	R_{29}
R_{19}	R_{20}	R_{21}	R_{22}	R_{23}	R_{24}	R_{25}	R_{26}	R_{27}	R_{28}
R_{18}	R_{17}	R_{16}	R_{15}	R_{14}	R_{13}	R_{12}	R_{11}	R_{10}	R_{9}
		R_{1}	R_{2}	R_{3}	R_{4}	R_{5}	R_{6}	R_{7}	R_{8}

== 1932 ==
		D_{1}	D_{2}	D_{3}	D_{4}	D_{5}	D_{6}	D_{7}	D_{8}
D_{18}	D_{17}	D_{16}	D_{15}	D_{14}	D_{13}	D_{12}	D_{11}	D_{10}	D_{9}
D_{19}	D_{20}	D_{21}	D_{22}	D_{23}	D_{24}	D_{25}	D_{26}	D_{27}	D_{28}
**D_{38} Re-elected**	**D_{37} Re-elected**	**D_{36} Re-elected**	**D_{35} Re-elected**	**D_{34} Re-elected**	**D_{33} Re-elected**	**D_{32} Re-elected**	D_{31}	D_{30}	D_{29}
**D_{39} Re-elected**	**D_{40} Re-elected**	**D_{41} Re-elected**	**D_{42} Re-elected**	**D_{43} Re-elected**	**D_{44} Re-elected**	**D_{45} Hold**	**D_{46} Hold**	**D_{47} Hold**	**D_{48} Gain**
**Majority →**									**D_{49} Gain**
**D_{58} Gain**	**D_{57} Gain**	**D_{56} Gain**	**D_{55} Gain**	**D_{54} Gain**	**D_{53} Gain**	**D_{52} Gain**	**D_{51} Gain**	**D_{50} Gain**	**D_{49} Gain**
**D_{59} Gain**	FL_{1}	**R_{36} Re-elected**	**R_{35} Re-elected**	**R_{34} Re-elected**	**R_{33} Re-elected**	**R_{32} Re-elected**	R_{31}	R_{30}	R_{29}
R_{19}	R_{20}	R_{21}	R_{22}	R_{23}	R_{24}	R_{25}	R_{26}	R_{27}	R_{28}
R_{18}	R_{17}	R_{16}	R_{15}	R_{14}	R_{13}	R_{12}	R_{11}	R_{10}	R_{9}
		R_{1}	R_{2}	R_{3}	R_{4}	R_{5}	R_{6}	R_{7}	R_{8}

== 1934 ==
		D_{1}	D_{2}	D_{3}	D_{4}	D_{5}	D_{6}	D_{7}	D_{8}
D_{18}	D_{17}	D_{16}	D_{15}	D_{14}	D_{13}	D_{12}	D_{11}	D_{10}	D_{9}
D_{19}	D_{20}	D_{21}	D_{22}	D_{23}	D_{24}	D_{25}	D_{26}	D_{27}	D_{28}
D_{38}	D_{37}	D_{36}	D_{35}	D_{34}	D_{33}	D_{32}	D_{31}	D_{30}	D_{29}
D_{39}	D_{40}	D_{41}	D_{42}	D_{43}	D_{44}	D_{45}	D_{45}	**D_{47} Re-elected**	**D_{48} Re-elected**
**Majority →**									**D_{49} Re-elected**
**D_{58} Hold**	**D_{57} Re-elected**	**D_{56} Re-elected**	**D_{55} Re-elected**	**D_{54} Re-elected**	**D_{53} Re-elected**	**D_{52} Re-elected**	**D_{51} Re-elected**	**D_{50} Re-elected**	**D_{49} Re-elected**
**D_{59} Hold**	**D_{60} Hold**	**D_{61} Gain**	**D_{62} Gain**	**D_{63} Gain**	**D_{64} Gain**	**D_{65} Gain**	**D_{66} Gain**	**D_{67} Gain**	**D_{68} Gain**
**R_{19} Re-elected**	**R_{20} Re-elected**	**R_{21} Re-elected**	**R_{22} Re-elected**	**R_{23} Re-elected**	**R_{24} Re-elected**	**R_{25} Re-elected**	**P_{1} Re-elected new party**	**FL_{1} Re-elected**	**D_{69} Gain**
R_{18}	R_{17}	R_{16}	R_{15}	R_{14}	R_{13}	R_{12}	R_{11}	R_{10}	R_{9}
		R_{1}	R_{2}	R_{3}	R_{4}	R_{5}	R_{6}	R_{7}	R_{8}

== 1936 ==
		D_{1}	D_{2}	D_{3}	D_{4}	D_{5}	D_{6}	D_{7}	D_{8}
D_{18}	D_{17}	D_{16}	D_{15}	D_{14}	D_{13}	D_{12}	D_{11}	D_{10}	D_{9}
D_{19}	D_{20}	D_{21}	D_{22}	D_{23}	D_{24}	D_{25}	D_{26}	D_{27}	D_{28}
D_{38}	D_{37}	D_{36}	D_{35}	D_{34}	D_{33}	D_{32}	D_{31}	D_{30}	D_{29}
D_{39}	D_{40}	D_{41}	D_{42}	D_{43}	D_{44}	D_{45}	D_{45}	D_{46}	D_{47}
**Majority →**									D_{49}
**D_{58} Re-elected**	**D_{57} Re-elected**	**D_{56} Re-elected**	**D_{55} Re-elected**	**D_{54} Re-elected**	**D_{53} Re-elected**	**D_{52} Re-elected**	**D_{51} Re-elected**	D_{50}	D_{49}
**D_{59} Re-elected**	**D_{60} Re-elected**	**D_{61} Re-elected**	**D_{62} Re-elected**	**D_{63} Re-elected**	**D_{64} Re-elected**	**D_{65} Re-elected**	**D_{66} Hold**	**D_{67} Hold**	**D_{68} Hold**
FL_{1}	**FL_{2} Hold**	P_{1}	V_{1}	**D_{74} Gain**	**D_{73} Gain**	**D_{72} Gain**	**D_{71} Gain**	**D_{70} Gain**	**D_{69} Gain**
**I_{1} Re-elected new party**	**R_{17} Gain**	**R_{16} Hold**	**R_{15} Re-elected**	**R_{14} Re-elected**	**R_{13} Re-elected**	**R_{12} Re-elected**	R_{11}	R_{10}	R_{9}
		R_{1}	R_{2}	R_{3}	R_{4}	R_{5}	R_{6}	R_{7}	R_{8}

== 1938 ==
		D_{1}	D_{2}	D_{3}	D_{4}	D_{5}	D_{6}	D_{7}	D_{8}
D_{18}	D_{17}	D_{16}	D_{15}	D_{14}	D_{13}	D_{12}	D_{11}	D_{10}	D_{9}
D_{19}	D_{20}	D_{21}	D_{22}	D_{23}	D_{24}	D_{25}	D_{26}	D_{27}	D_{28}
D_{38}	D_{37}	D_{36}	D_{35}	D_{34}	D_{33}	D_{32}	D_{31}	D_{30}	D_{29}
D_{39}	D_{40}	D_{41}	D_{42}	D_{43}	D_{44}	D_{45}	D_{46}	D_{47}	D_{48}
**Majority →**									**D_{49} Re-elected**
**D_{58} Re-elected**	**D_{57} Hold**	**D_{56} Re-elected**	**D_{55} Re-elected**	**D_{54} Re-elected**	**D_{53} Re-elected**	**D_{52} Hold**	**D_{51} Re-elected**	**D_{50} Re-elected**	**D_{49} Re-elected**
**D_{59} Re-elected**	**D_{60} Re-elected**	**D_{61} Re-elected**	**D_{62} Re-elected**	**D_{63} Re-elected**	**D_{64} Re-elected**	**D_{65} Re-elected**	**D_{66} Re-elected**	**D_{67} Re-elected**	**D_{68} Hold**
**R_{19} Gain**	**R_{20} Gain**	**R_{21} Gain**	**R_{22} Gain**	P_{1}	FL_{1}	FL_{2}	I_{1}	**D_{70} Re-elected**	**D_{69} Re-elected**
**R_{18} Gain**	**R_{17} Gain**	**R_{16} Gain**	**R_{15} Re-elected**	**R_{14} Re-elected**	**R_{13} Re-elected**	R_{12}	R_{11}	R_{10}	R_{9}
		R_{1}	R_{2}	R_{3}	R_{4}	R_{5}	R_{6}	R_{7}	R_{8}

== 1940 ==
		D_{1}	D_{2}	D_{3}	D_{4}	D_{5}	D_{6}	D_{7}	D_{8}
D_{18}	D_{17}	D_{16}	D_{15}	D_{14}	D_{13}	D_{12}	D_{11}	D_{10}	D_{9}
D_{19}	D_{20}	D_{21}	D_{22}	D_{23}	D_{24}	D_{25}	D_{26}	D_{27}	D_{28}
D_{38}	D_{37}	D_{36}	D_{35}	D_{34}	D_{33}	D_{32}	D_{31}	D_{30}	D_{29}
D_{39}	D_{40}	D_{41}	D_{42}	D_{43}	D_{44}	D_{45}	D_{46}	**D_{47} Re-elected**	**D_{48} Re-elected**
**Majority →**									**D_{49} Re-elected**
**D_{58} Re-elected**	**D_{57} Re-elected**	**D_{56} Re-elected**	**D_{55} Re-elected**	**D_{54} Re-elected**	**D_{53} Re-elected**	**D_{52} Re-elected**	**D_{51} Re-elected**	**D_{50} Re-elected**	**D_{49} Re-elected**
**D_{59} Re-elected**	**D_{60} Re-elected**	**D_{61} Re-elected**	**D_{62} Re-elected**	**D_{63} Hold**	**D_{64} Hold**	**D_{65} Hold**	**D_{66} Hold**	**D_{67} Gain**	I_{1}
**R_{19} Re-elected**	**R_{20} Re-elected**	**R_{21} Re-elected**	**R_{22} Hold**	**R_{23} Hold**	**R_{24} Gain**	**R_{25} Gain**	**R_{26} Gain**	**R_{27} Gain**	**P_{1} Re-elected**
**R_{18} Re-elected**	R_{17}	R_{16}	R_{15}	R_{14}	R_{13}	R_{12}	R_{11}	R_{10}	R_{9}
		R_{1}	R_{2}	R_{3}	R_{4}	R_{5}	R_{6}	R_{7}	R_{8}

== 1942 ==
		D_{1}	D_{2}	D_{3}	D_{4}	D_{5}	D_{6}	D_{7}	D_{8}
D_{18}	D_{17}	D_{16}	D_{15}	D_{14}	D_{13}	D_{12}	D_{11}	D_{10}	D_{9}
D_{19}	D_{20}	D_{21}	D_{22}	D_{23}	D_{24}	D_{25}	D_{26}	D_{27}	D_{28}
D_{38}	D_{37}	D_{36}	D_{35}	D_{34}	D_{33}	D_{32}	D_{31}	D_{30}	D_{29}
D_{39}	D_{40}	D_{41}	D_{42}	**D_{43} Re-elected**	**D_{44} Re-elected**	**D_{45} Re-elected**	**D_{46} Re-elected**	**D_{47} Re-elected**	**D_{48} Re-elected**
**Majority →**									**D_{49} Re-elected**
P_{1}	**D_{57} Hold**	**D_{56} Hold**	**D_{55} Re-elected**	**D_{54} Re-elected**	**D_{53} Re-elected**	**D_{52} Re-elected**	**D_{51} Re-elected**	**D_{50} Re-elected**	**D_{49} Re-elected**
**R_{38} Gain**	**R_{37} Gain**	**R_{36} Gain**	**R_{35} Gain**	**R_{34} Gain**	**R_{33} Gain**	**R_{32} Gain**	**R_{31} Gain**	**R_{30} Gain**	**R_{29} Re-elected**
R_{19}	R_{20}	**R_{21} Re-elected**	**R_{22} Re-elected**	**R_{23} Re-elected**	**R_{24} Re-elected**	**R_{25} Re-elected**	**R_{26} Re-elected**	**R_{27} Re-elected**	**R_{28} Re-elected**
R_{18}	R_{17}	R_{16}	R_{15}	R_{14}	R_{13}	R_{12}	R_{11}	R_{10}	R_{9}
		R_{1}	R_{2}	R_{3}	R_{4}	R_{5}	R_{6}	R_{7}	R_{8}

== 1944 ==
		D_{1}	D_{2}	D_{3}	D_{4}	D_{5}	D_{6}	D_{7}	D_{8}
D_{18}	D_{17}	D_{16}	D_{15}	D_{14}	D_{13}	D_{12}	D_{11}	D_{10}	D_{9}
D_{19}	D_{20}	D_{21}	D_{22}	D_{23}	D_{24}	D_{25}	D_{26}	D_{27}	D_{28}
**D_{38} Re-elected**	D_{37}	D_{36}	D_{35}	D_{34}	D_{33}	D_{32}	D_{31}	D_{30}	D_{29}
**D_{39} Re-elected**	**D_{40} Re-elected**	**D_{41} Re-elected**	**D_{42} Re-elected**	**D_{43} Re-elected**	**D_{44} Re-elected**	**D_{45} Re-elected**	**D_{46} Re-elected**	**D_{47} Re-elected**	**D_{48} Re-elected**
**Majority →**									**D_{49} Re-elected**
**D_{58} Gain**	**D_{57} Gain**	**D_{56} Gain**	**D_{55} Hold**	**D_{54} Hold**	**D_{53} Hold**	**D_{52} Hold**	**D_{51} Hold**	**D_{50} Re-elected**	**D_{49} Re-elected**
P_{1}	**R_{37} Gain**	**R_{36} Gain**	**R_{35} Gain**	**R_{34} Hold**	**R_{33} Re-elected**	**R_{32} Re-elected**	**R_{31} Re-elected**	**R_{30} Re-elected**	**R_{29} Re-elected**
R_{19}	R_{20}	R_{21}	R_{22}	R_{23}	R_{24}	R_{25}	R_{26}	**R_{27} Re-elected**	**R_{28} Re-elected**
R_{18}	R_{17}	R_{16}	R_{15}	R_{14}	R_{13}	R_{12}	R_{11}	R_{10}	R_{9}
		R_{1}	R_{2}	R_{3}	R_{4}	R_{5}	R_{6}	R_{7}	R_{8}

== 1946 ==
		D_{1}	D_{2}	D_{3}	D_{4}	D_{5}	D_{6}	D_{7}	D_{8}
D_{18}	D_{17}	D_{16}	D_{15}	D_{14}	D_{13}	D_{12}	D_{11}	D_{10}	D_{9}
D_{19}	D_{20}	D_{21}	D_{22}	D_{23}	D_{24}	D_{25}	D_{26}	D_{27}	D_{28}
**D_{38} Re-elected**	**D_{37} Re-elected**	**D_{36} Re-elected**	D_{35}	D_{34}	D_{33}	D_{32}	D_{31}	D_{30}	D_{29}
**D_{39} Re-elected**	**D_{40} Re-elected**	**D_{41} Re-elected**	**D_{42} Re-elected**	**D_{43} Re-elected**	**D_{44} Hold**	**D_{45} Hold**	**D_{46} Hold**	**R_{50} Gain**	**R_{49} Gain**
**Majority →**									**R_{48} Gain**
**R_{39} Hold**	**R_{40} Gain**	**R_{41} Gain**	**R_{42} Gain**	**R_{43} Gain**	**R_{44} Gain**	**R_{45} Gain**	**R_{46} Gain**	**R_{47} Gain**	**R_{48} Gain**
**R_{38} Hold**	**R_{37} Hold**	**R_{36} Re-elected**	**R_{35} Re-elected**	**R_{34} Re-elected**	**R_{33} Re-elected**	**R_{32} Re-elected**	**R_{31} Re-elected**	**R_{30} Re-elected**	R_{29}
R_{19}	R_{20}	R_{21}	R_{22}	R_{23}	R_{24}	R_{25}	R_{26}	R_{27}	R_{28}
R_{18}	R_{17}	R_{16}	R_{15}	R_{14}	R_{13}	R_{12}	R_{11}	R_{10}	R_{9}
		R_{1}	R_{2}	R_{3}	R_{4}	R_{5}	R_{6}	R_{7}	R_{8}

== 1948 ==
		D_{1}	D_{2}	D_{3}	D_{4}	D_{5}	D_{6}	D_{7}	D_{8}
D_{18}	D_{17}	D_{16}	D_{15}	D_{14}	D_{13}	D_{12}	D_{11}	D_{10}	D_{9}
D_{19}	D_{20}	D_{21}	D_{22}	D_{23}	D_{24}	D_{25}	D_{26}	D_{27}	D_{28}
**D_{38} Re-elected**	**D_{37} Re-elected**	**D_{36} Re-elected**	**D_{35} Re-elected**	**D_{34} Re-elected**	**D_{33} Re-elected**	**D_{32} Re-elected**	D_{31}	D_{30}	D_{29}
**D_{39} Re-elected**	**D_{40} Re-elected**	**D_{41} Re-elected**	**D_{42} Hold**	**D_{43} Hold**	**D_{44} Hold**	**D_{45} Hold**	**D_{46} Gain**	**D_{47} Gain**	**D_{48} Gain**
**Majority →**									**D_{49} Gain**
**R_{39} Hold**	**R_{40} Hold**	**R_{41} Hold**	**R_{42} Hold**	**D_{54} Gain**	**D_{53} Gain**	**D_{52} Gain**	**D_{51} Gain**	**D_{50} Gain**	**D_{49} Gain**
**R_{38} Re-elected**	**R_{37} Re-elected**	**R_{36} Re-elected**	**R_{35} Re-elected**	**R_{34} Re-elected**	R_{33}	R_{32}	R_{31}	R_{30}	R_{29}
R_{19}	R_{20}	R_{21}	R_{22}	R_{23}	R_{24}	R_{25}	R_{26}	R_{27}	R_{28}
R_{18}	R_{17}	R_{16}	R_{15}	R_{14}	R_{13}	R_{12}	R_{11}	R_{10}	R_{9}
		R_{1}	R_{2}	R_{3}	R_{4}	R_{5}	R_{6}	R_{7}	R_{8}

== 1950 ==
		D_{1}	D_{2}	D_{3}	D_{4}	D_{5}	D_{6}	D_{7}	D_{8}
D_{18}	D_{17}	D_{16}	D_{15}	D_{14}	D_{13}	D_{12}	D_{11}	D_{10}	D_{9}
D_{19}	D_{20}	D_{21}	D_{22}	D_{23}	D_{24}	D_{25}	D_{26}	D_{27}	D_{28}
**D_{38} Re-elected**	**D_{37} Re-elected**	**D_{36} Re-elected**	**D_{35} Re-elected**	D_{34}	D_{33}	D_{32}	D_{31}	D_{30}	D_{29}
**D_{39} Re-elected**	**D_{40} Re-elected**	**D_{41} Re-elected**	**D_{42} Re-elected**	**D_{43} Re-elected**	**D_{44} Re-elected**	**D_{45} Re-elected**	**D_{46} Hold**	**D_{47} Hold**	**D_{48} Hold**
**Majority →**									**D_{49} Gain**
**R_{39} Re-elected**	**R_{40} Re-elected**	**R_{41} Hold**	**R_{42} Hold**	**R_{43} Gain**	**R_{44} Gain**	**R_{45} Gain**	**R_{46} Gain**	**R_{47} Gain**	**D_{49} Gain**
**R_{38} Re-elected**	**R_{37} Re-elected**	**R_{36} Re-elected**	**R_{35} Re-elected**	**R_{34} Re-elected**	**R_{33} Re-elected**	**R_{32} Re-elected**	**R_{31} Re-elected**	R_{30}	R_{29}
R_{19}	R_{20}	R_{21}	R_{22}	R_{23}	R_{24}	R_{25}	R_{26}	R_{27}	R_{28}
R_{18}	R_{17}	R_{16}	R_{15}	R_{14}	R_{13}	R_{12}	R_{11}	R_{10}	R_{9}
		R_{1}	R_{2}	R_{3}	R_{4}	R_{5}	R_{6}	R_{7}	R_{8}

== 1952 ==
		D_{1}	D_{2}	D_{3}	D_{4}	D_{5}	D_{6}	D_{7}	D_{8}
D_{18}	D_{17}	D_{16}	D_{15}	D_{14}	D_{13}	D_{12}	D_{11}	D_{10}	D_{9}
D_{19}	D_{20}	D_{21}	D_{22}	D_{23}	D_{24}	D_{25}	D_{26}	D_{27}	D_{28}
**D_{38} Re-elected**	**D_{38} Re-elected**	D_{36}	D_{35}	D_{34}	D_{33}	D_{32}	D_{31}	D_{30}	D_{29}
**D_{39} Re-elected**	**D_{40} Re-elected**	**D_{41} Re-elected**	**D_{42} Re-elected**	**D_{43} Hold**	**D_{44} Hold**	**D_{45} Gain**	**D_{46} Gain**	**D_{47} Gain**	**D_{48} Gain**
**Majority using VP's vote ↓**
**R_{39} Re-elected**	**R_{40} Re-elected**	**R_{41} Re-elected**	**R_{42} Re-elected**	**R_{43} Hold**	**R_{44} Gain**	**R_{45} Gain**	**R_{46} Gain**	**R_{47} Gain**	**R_{48} Gain**
**R_{38} Re-elected**	**R_{37} Re-elected**	**R_{36} Re-elected**	**R_{35} Re-elected**	**R_{34} Re-elected**	**R_{33} Re-elected**	**R_{32} Re-elected**	**R_{31} Re-elected**	**R_{30} Re-elected**	**R_{29} Re-elected**
R_{19}	R_{20}	R_{21}	R_{22}	R_{23}	R_{24}	R_{25}	R_{26}	R_{27}	R_{28}
R_{18}	R_{17}	R_{16}	R_{15}	R_{14}	R_{13}	R_{12}	R_{11}	R_{10}	R_{9}
		R_{1}	R_{2}	R_{3}	R_{4}	R_{5}	R_{6}	R_{7}	R_{8}

== 1954 ==
		D_{1}	D_{2}	D_{3}	D_{4}	D_{5}	D_{6}	D_{7}	D_{8}
D_{18}	D_{17}	D_{16}	D_{15}	D_{14}	D_{13}	D_{12}	D_{11}	D_{10}	D_{9}
D_{19}	D_{20}	D_{21}	D_{22}	D_{23}	D_{24}	D_{25}	D_{26}	**D_{27} Re-elected**	**D_{28} Re-elected**
**D_{38} Re-elected**	**D_{37} Hold**	**D_{36} Re-elected**	**D_{35} Re-elected**	**D_{34} Re-elected**	**D_{33} Re-elected**	**D_{32} Re-elected**	**D_{31} Re-elected**	**D_{30} Re-elected**	**D_{29} Re-elected**
**D_{39} Re-elected**	**D_{40} Re-elected**	**D_{41} Re-elected**	**D_{42} Re-elected**	**D_{43} Re-elected**	**D_{44} Hold**	**D_{45} Gain**	**D_{46} Gain**	**D_{47} Gain**	**D_{48} Gain**
**Plurality ↑**
**R_{39} Re-elected**	**R_{40} Re-elected**	**R_{41} Re-elected**	**R_{42} Re-elected**	**R_{43} Re-elected**	**R_{44} Hold**	**R_{45} Hold**	**R_{46} Gain**	**R_{47} Gain**	I_{1}
**R_{38} Re-elected**	R_{37}	R_{36}	R_{35}	R_{34}	R_{33}	R_{32}	R_{31}	R_{30}	R_{29}
R_{19}	R_{20}	R_{21}	R_{22}	R_{23}	R_{24}	R_{25}	R_{26}	R_{27}	R_{28}
R_{18}	R_{17}	R_{16}	R_{15}	R_{14}	R_{13}	R_{12}	R_{11}	R_{10}	R_{9}
		R_{1}	R_{2}	R_{3}	R_{4}	R_{5}	R_{6}	R_{7}	R_{8}

== 1956 ==
		D_{1}	D_{2}	D_{3}	D_{4}	D_{5}	D_{6}	D_{7}	D_{8}
D_{18}	D_{17}	D_{16}	D_{15}	D_{14}	D_{13}	D_{12}	D_{11}	D_{10}	D_{9}
D_{19}	D_{20}	D_{21}	D_{22}	D_{23}	D_{24}	D_{25}	D_{26}	D_{27}	D_{28}
**D_{38} Re-elected**	**D_{37} Re-elected**	**D_{36} Re-elected**	**D_{35} Re-elected**	D_{34}	D_{33}	D_{32}	D_{31}	D_{30}	D_{29}
**D_{39} Re-elected**	**D_{40} Re-elected**	**D_{41} Re-elected**	**D_{42} Re-elected**	**D_{43} Re-elected**	**D_{44} Re-elected**	**D_{45} Re-elected**	**D_{46} Re-elected**	**D_{47} Hold**	**D_{48} Gain**
**Majority →**									**D_{49} Gain**
**R_{39} Re-elected**	**R_{40} Re-elected**	**R_{41} Re-elected**	**R_{42} Re-elected**	**R_{43} Re-elected**	**R_{44} Gain**	**R_{45} Gain**	**D_{51} Gain**	**D_{50} Gain**	**D_{49} Gain**
**R_{38} Re-elected**	**R_{37} Re-elected**	**R_{36} Re-elected**	**R_{35} Re-elected**	**R_{34} Re-elected**	**R_{33} Re-elected**	**R_{32} Re-elected**	**R_{31} Re-elected**	R_{30}	R_{29}
R_{19}	R_{20}	R_{21}	R_{22}	R_{23}	R_{24}	R_{25}	R_{26}	R_{27}	R_{28}
R_{18}	R_{17}	R_{16}	R_{15}	R_{14}	R_{13}	R_{12}	R_{11}	R_{10}	R_{9}
		R_{1}	R_{2}	R_{3}	R_{4}	R_{5}	R_{6}	R_{7}	R_{8}

== 1958 ==
		D_{1}	D_{2}	D_{3}	D_{4}	D_{5}	D_{6}	D_{7}	D_{8}
D_{18}	D_{17}	D_{16}	D_{15}	D_{14}	D_{13}	D_{12}	D_{11}	D_{10}	D_{9}
D_{19}	D_{20}	D_{21}	D_{22}	D_{23}	D_{24}	D_{25}	D_{26}	D_{27}	D_{28}
**D_{38} Re-elected**	D_{37}	D_{36}	D_{35}	D_{34}	D_{33}	D_{32}	D_{31}	D_{30}	D_{29}
**D_{39} Re-elected**	**D_{40} Re-elected**	**D_{41} Re-elected**	**D_{42} Re-elected**	**D_{43} Re-elected**	**D_{44} Re-elected**	**D_{45} Re-elected**	**D_{46} Re-elected**	**D_{47} Re-elected**	**D_{48} Re-elected**
**Majority →**									**D_{49} Re-elected**
**D_{58} Gain**	**D_{57} Gain**	**D_{56} Gain**	**D_{55} Gain**	**D_{54} Gain**	**D_{53} Gain**	**D_{52} Gain**	**D_{51} Gain**	**D_{50} Gain**	**D_{49} Re-elected**
**D_{59} Gain**	**D_{60} Gain**	**D_{61} Gain**	**R_{35} Hold**	**R_{34} Hold**	**R_{33} Hold**	**R_{32} Re-elected**	**R_{31} Re-elected**	**R_{30} Re-elected**	**R_{29} Re-elected**
R_{19}	R_{20}	R_{21}	R_{22}	R_{23}	R_{24}	R_{25}	R_{26}	R_{27}	**R_{28} Re-elected**
R_{18}	R_{17}	R_{16}	R_{15}	R_{14}	R_{13}	R_{12}	R_{11}	R_{10}	R_{9}
		R_{1}	R_{2}	R_{3}	R_{4}	R_{5}	R_{6}	R_{7}	R_{8}

== 1960 ==
D_{1}	D_{2}	D_{3}	D_{4}	D_{5}	D_{6}	D_{7}	D_{8}	D_{9}	D_{10}
D_{20}	D_{19}	D_{18}	D_{17}	D_{16}	D_{15}	D_{14}	D_{13}	D_{12}	D_{11}
D_{21}	D_{22}	D_{23}	D_{24}	D_{25}	D_{26}	D_{27}	D_{28}	D_{29}	D_{30}
D_{40}	D_{39}	D_{38}	D_{37}	D_{36}	D_{35}	D_{34}	D_{33}	D_{32}	D_{31}
D_{41}	D_{42}	D_{43}	D_{44}	**D_{45} Re-elected**	**D_{46} Re-elected**	**D_{47} Re-elected**	**D_{48} Re-elected**	**D_{49} Re-elected**	**D_{50} Re-elected**
**Majority →**									**D_{51} Re-elected**
**D_{60} Re-elected**	**D_{59} Re-elected**	**D_{58} Re-elected**	**D_{57} Re-elected**	**D_{56} Re-elected**	**D_{55} Re-elected**	**D_{54} Re-elected**	**D_{53} Re-elected**	**D_{52} Re-elected**	**D_{51} Re-elected**
**D_{61} Re-elected**	**D_{62} Re-elected**	**D_{63} Hold**	**D_{64} Hold**	**R_{36} Gain**	**R_{35} Gain**	**R_{34} Hold**	**R_{33} Re-elected**	**R_{32} Re-elected**	**R_{31} Re-elected**
R_{21}	R_{22}	R_{23}	**R_{24} Re-elected**	**R_{25} Re-elected**	**R_{26} Re-elected**	**R_{27} Re-elected**	**R_{28} Re-elected**	**R_{29} Re-elected**	**R_{30} Re-elected**
R_{20}	R_{19}	R_{18}	R_{17}	R_{16}	R_{15}	R_{14}	R_{13}	R_{12}	R_{11}
R_{1}	R_{2}	R_{3}	R_{4}	R_{5}	R_{6}	R_{7}	R_{8}	R_{9}	R_{10}

== 1962 ==
D_{1}	D_{2}	D_{3}	D_{4}	D_{5}	D_{6}	D_{7}	D_{8}	D_{9}	D_{10}
D_{20}	D_{19}	D_{18}	D_{17}	D_{16}	D_{15}	D_{14}	D_{13}	D_{12}	D_{11}
D_{21}	D_{22}	D_{23}	D_{24}	D_{25}	D_{26}	D_{27}	D_{28}	D_{29}	D_{30}
D_{40}	D_{39}	D_{38}	D_{37}	D_{36}	D_{35}	D_{34}	D_{33}	D_{32}	D_{31}
D_{41}	D_{42}	D_{43}	D_{44}	D_{45}	**D_{46} Re-elected**	**D_{47} Re-elected**	**D_{48} Re-elected**	**D_{49} Re-elected**	**D_{50} Re-elected**
**Majority →**									**D_{51} Re-elected**
**D_{60} Re-elected**	**D_{59} Re-elected**	**D_{58} Re-elected**	**D_{57} Re-elected**	**D_{56} Re-elected**	**D_{55} Re-elected**	**D_{54} Re-elected**	**D_{53} Re-elected**	**D_{52} Re-elected**	**D_{51} Re-elected**
**D_{61} Re-elected**	**D_{62} Re-elected**	**D_{63} Hold**	**D_{64} Gain**	**D_{65} Gain**	**D_{66} Gain**	**D_{67} Gain**	**D_{68} Gain**	**R_{32} Gain**	**R_{31} Re-elected**
R_{21}	**R_{22} Re-elected**	**R_{23} Re-elected**	**R_{24} Re-elected**	**R_{25} Re-elected**	**R_{26} Re-elected**	**R_{27} Re-elected**	**R_{28} Re-elected**	**R_{29} Re-elected**	**R_{30} Re-elected**
R_{20}	R_{19}	R_{18}	R_{17}	R_{16}	R_{15}	R_{14}	R_{13}	R_{12}	R_{11}
R_{1}	R_{2}	R_{3}	R_{4}	R_{5}	R_{6}	R_{7}	R_{8}	R_{9}	R_{10}

== 1964 ==
D_{1}	D_{2}	D_{3}	D_{4}	D_{5}	D_{6}	D_{7}	D_{8}	D_{9}	D_{10}
D_{20}	D_{19}	D_{18}	D_{17}	D_{16}	D_{15}	D_{14}	D_{13}	D_{12}	D_{11}
D_{21}	D_{22}	D_{23}	D_{24}	D_{25}	D_{26}	D_{27}	D_{28}	D_{29}	D_{30}
D_{40}	D_{39}	D_{38}	D_{37}	D_{36}	D_{35}	D_{34}	D_{33}	D_{32}	D_{31}
D_{41}	D_{42}	**D_{43} Re-elected**	**D_{44} Re-elected**	**D_{45} Re-elected**	**D_{46} Re-elected**	**D_{47} Re-elected**	**D_{48} Re-elected**	**D_{49} Re-elected**	**D_{50} Re-elected**
**Majority →**									**D_{51} Re-elected**
**D_{60} Re-elected**	**D_{59} Re-elected**	**D_{58} Re-elected**	**D_{57} Re-elected**	**D_{56} Re-elected**	**D_{55} Re-elected**	**D_{54} Re-elected**	**D_{53} Re-elected**	**D_{52} Re-elected**	**D_{51} Re-elected**
**D_{61} Re-elected**	**D_{62} Re-elected**	**D_{63} Re-elected**	**D_{64} Re-elected**	**D_{65} Re-elected**	**D_{66} Gain**	**D_{67} Gain**	**D_{68} Gain**	**R_{32} Gain**	**R_{31} Hold**
R_{21}	R_{22}	R_{23}	R_{24}	R_{25}	**R_{26} Re-elected**	**R_{27} Re-elected**	**R_{28} Re-elected**	**R_{29} Re-elected**	**R_{30} Re-elected**
R_{20}	R_{19}	R_{18}	R_{17}	R_{16}	R_{15}	R_{14}	R_{13}	R_{12}	R_{11}
R_{1}	R_{2}	R_{3}	R_{4}	R_{5}	R_{6}	R_{7}	R_{8}	R_{9}	R_{10}

== 1966 ==
D_{1}	D_{2}	D_{3}	D_{4}	D_{5}	D_{6}	D_{7}	D_{8}	D_{9}	D_{10}
D_{20}	D_{19}	D_{18}	D_{17}	D_{16}	D_{15}	D_{14}	D_{13}	D_{12}	D_{11}
D_{21}	D_{22}	D_{23}	D_{24}	D_{25}	D_{26}	D_{27}	D_{28}	D_{29}	D_{30}
D_{40}	D_{39}	D_{38}	D_{37}	D_{36}	D_{35}	D_{34}	D_{33}	D_{32}	D_{31}
D_{41}	D_{42}	D_{43}	D_{44}	D_{45}	D_{46}	D_{47}	D_{48}	D_{49}	**D_{50} Re-elected**
**Majority →**									**D_{51} Re-elected**
**D_{60} Re-elected**	**D_{59} Re-elected**	**D_{58} Re-elected**	**D_{57} Re-elected**	**D_{56} Re-elected**	**D_{55} Re-elected**	**D_{54} Re-elected**	**D_{53} Re-elected**	**D_{52} Re-elected**	**D_{51} Re-elected**
**D_{61} Re-elected**	**D_{62} Re-elected**	**D_{63} Re-elected**	**D_{64} Hold**	**R_{36} Gain**	**R_{35} Gain**	**R_{34} Gain**	**R_{33} Hold**	**R_{32} Hold**	**R_{31} Re-elected**
**R_{21} Re-elected**	**R_{22} Re-elected**	**R_{23} Re-elected**	**R_{24} Re-elected**	**R_{25} Re-elected**	**R_{26} Re-elected**	**R_{27} Re-elected**	**R_{28} Re-elected**	**R_{29} Re-elected**	**R_{30} Re-elected**
**R_{20} Re-elected**	**R_{19} Re-elected**	R_{18}	R_{17}	R_{16}	R_{15}	R_{14}	R_{13}	R_{12}	R_{11}
R_{1}	R_{2}	R_{3}	R_{4}	R_{5}	R_{6}	R_{7}	R_{8}	R_{9}	R_{10}

== 1968 ==
D_{1}	D_{2}	D_{3}	D_{4}	D_{5}	D_{6}	D_{7}	D_{8}	D_{9}	D_{10}
D_{20}	D_{19}	D_{18}	D_{17}	D_{16}	D_{15}	D_{14}	D_{13}	D_{12}	D_{11}
D_{21}	D_{22}	D_{23}	D_{24}	D_{25}	D_{26}	D_{27}	D_{28}	D_{29}	D_{30}
D_{40}	D_{39}	D_{38}	D_{37}	D_{36}	D_{35}	D_{34}	D_{33}	D_{32}	D_{31}
**D_{41} Re-elected**	**D_{42} Re-elected**	**D_{43} Re-elected**	**D_{44} Re-elected**	**D_{45} Re-elected**	**D_{46} Re-elected**	**D_{47} Re-elected**	**D_{48} Re-elected**	**D_{49} Re-elected**	**D_{50} Re-elected**
**Majority →**									**D_{51} Re-elected**
**R_{41} Gain**	**R_{42} Gain**	**D_{58} Gain**	**D_{57} Gain**	**D_{56} Hold**	**D_{55} Hold**	**D_{54} Hold**	**D_{53} Re-elected**	**D_{52} Re-elected**	**D_{51} Re-elected**
**R_{40} Gain**	**R_{39} Gain**	**R_{38} Gain**	**R_{37} Gain**	**R_{36} Gain**	**R_{35} Hold**	**R_{34} Hold**	**R_{33} Re-elected**	**R_{32} Re-elected**	**R_{31} Re-elected**
R_{21}	R_{22}	R_{23}	R_{24}	R_{25}	R_{26}	**R_{27} Re-elected**	**R_{28} Re-elected**	**R_{29} Re-elected**	**R_{30} Re-elected**
R_{20}	R_{19}	R_{18}	R_{17}	R_{16}	R_{15}	R_{14}	R_{13}	R_{12}	R_{11}
R_{1}	R_{2}	R_{3}	R_{4}	R_{5}	R_{6}	R_{7}	R_{8}	R_{9}	R_{10}

== 1970 ==
D_{1}	D_{2}	D_{3}	D_{4}	D_{5}	D_{6}	D_{7}	D_{8}	D_{9}	D_{10}
D_{20}	D_{19}	D_{18}	D_{17}	D_{16}	D_{15}	D_{14}	D_{13}	D_{12}	D_{11}
D_{21}	D_{22}	D_{23}	D_{24}	D_{25}	D_{26}	D_{27}	D_{28}	D_{29}	D_{30}
**D_{40} Re-elected**	**D_{39} Re-elected**	**D_{38} Re-elected**	**D_{37} Re-elected**	**D_{36} Re-elected**	**D_{35} Re-elected**	**D_{34} Re-elected**	D_{33}	D_{32}	D_{31}
**D_{41} Re-elected**	**D_{42} Re-elected**	**D_{43} Re-elected**	**D_{44} Re-elected**	**D_{45} Re-elected**	**D_{46} Re-elected**	**D_{47} Re-elected**	**D_{48} Re-elected**	**D_{49} Re-elected**	**D_{50} Hold**
**Majority →**									**D_{51} Hold**
**R_{41} Hold**	**R_{42} Gain**	**R_{43} Gain**	**R_{44} Gain**	**R_{45} Gain**	**C_{1} Gain**	**I_{1} Re-elected new party**	**D_{53} Gain**	**D_{52} Hold**	**D_{51} Hold**
**R_{40} Re-elected**	**R_{39} Re-elected**	**R_{38} Re-elected**	**R_{37} Re-elected**	**R_{36} Re-elected**	R_{35}	R_{34}	R_{33}	R_{32}	R_{31}
R_{21}	R_{22}	R_{23}	R_{24}	R_{25}	R_{26}	R_{27}	R_{28}	R_{29}	R_{30}
R_{20}	R_{19}	R_{18}	R_{17}	R_{16}	R_{15}	R_{14}	R_{13}	R_{12}	R_{11}
R_{1}	R_{2}	R_{3}	R_{4}	R_{5}	R_{6}	R_{7}	R_{8}	R_{9}	R_{10}

== 1972 ==
D_{1}	D_{2}	D_{3}	D_{4}	D_{5}	D_{6}	D_{7}	D_{8}	D_{9}	D_{10}
D_{20}	D_{19}	D_{18}	D_{17}	D_{16}	D_{15}	D_{14}	D_{13}	D_{12}	D_{11}
D_{21}	D_{22}	D_{23}	D_{24}	D_{25}	D_{26}	D_{27}	D_{28}	D_{29}	D_{30}
D_{40}	D_{39}	D_{38}	D_{37}	D_{36}	D_{35}	D_{34}	D_{33}	D_{32}	D_{31}
**D_{41} Re-elected**	**D_{42} Re-elected**	**D_{43} Re-elected**	**D_{44} Re-elected**	**D_{45} Re-elected**	**D_{46} Re-elected**	**D_{47} Re-elected**	**D_{48} Re-elected**	**D_{49} Hold**	**D_{50} Hold**
**Majority →**									**D_{51} Gain**
**R_{41} Gain**	**R_{42} Gain**	C_{1}	I_{1}	**D_{56} Gain**	**D_{55} Gain**	**D_{54} Gain**	**D_{53} Gain**	**D_{52} Gain**	**D_{51} Gain**
**R_{40} Gain**	**R_{39} Gain**	**R_{38} Hold**	**R_{37} Re-elected**	**R_{36} Re-elected**	**R_{35} Re-elected**	**R_{34} Re-elected**	**R_{33} Re-elected**	**R_{32} Re-elected**	**R_{31} Re-elected**
R_{21}	R_{22}	R_{23}	R_{24}	R_{25}	**R_{26} Re-elected**	**R_{27} Re-elected**	**R_{28} Re-elected**	**R_{29} Re-elected**	**R_{30} Re-elected**
R_{20}	R_{19}	R_{18}	R_{17}	R_{16}	R_{15}	R_{14}	R_{13}	R_{12}	R_{11}
R_{1}	R_{2}	R_{3}	R_{4}	R_{5}	R_{6}	R_{7}	R_{8}	R_{9}	R_{10}

== 1974 ==
D_{1}	D_{2}	D_{3}	D_{4}	D_{5}	D_{6}	D_{7}	D_{8}	D_{9}	D_{10}
D_{20}	D_{19}	D_{18}	D_{17}	D_{16}	D_{15}	D_{14}	D_{13}	D_{12}	D_{11}
D_{21}	D_{22}	D_{23}	D_{24}	D_{25}	D_{26}	D_{27}	D_{28}	D_{29}	D_{30}
**D_{40} Re-elected**	**D_{39} Re-elected**	**D_{38} Re-elected**	D_{37}	D_{36}	D_{35}	D_{34}	D_{33}	D_{32}	D_{31}
**D_{41} Re-elected**	**D_{42} Re-elected**	**D_{43} Re-elected**	**D_{44} Re-elected**	**D_{45} Re-elected**	**D_{46} Re-elected**	**D_{47} Re-elected**	**D_{48} Re-elected**	**D_{49} Re-elected**	**D_{50} Re-elected**
**Majority →**									**D_{51} Re-elected**
**D_{60} Gain**	**D_{59} Gain**	**D_{58} Gain**	**D_{57} Hold**	**D_{56} Hold**	**D_{55} Hold**	**D_{54} Hold**	**D_{53} Re-elected**	**D_{52} Re-elected**	**D_{51} Re-elected**
I_{1}	C_{1}	**R_{38} Gain**	**R_{37} Hold**	**R_{36} Hold**	**R_{35} Re-elected**	**R_{34} Re-elected**	**R_{33} Re-elected**	**R_{32} Re-elected**	**R_{31} Re-elected**
R_{21}	R_{22}	R_{23}	R_{24}	R_{25}	R_{26}	R_{27}	**R_{28} Re-elected**	**R_{29} Re-elected**	**R_{30} Re-elected**
R_{20}	R_{19}	R_{18}	R_{17}	R_{16}	R_{15}	R_{14}	R_{13}	R_{12}	R_{11}
R_{1}	R_{2}	R_{3}	R_{4}	R_{5}	R_{6}	R_{7}	R_{8}	R_{9}	R_{10}

== 1976 ==
D_{1}	D_{2}	D_{3}	D_{4}	D_{5}	D_{6}	D_{7}	D_{8}	D_{9}	D_{10}
D_{20}	D_{19}	D_{18}	D_{17}	D_{16}	D_{15}	D_{14}	D_{13}	D_{12}	D_{11}
D_{21}	D_{22}	D_{23}	D_{24}	D_{25}	D_{26}	D_{27}	D_{28}	D_{29}	D_{30}
D_{40}	D_{39}	D_{38}	D_{37}	D_{36}	D_{35}	D_{34}	D_{33}	D_{32}	D_{31}
**D_{41} Re-elected**	**D_{42} Re-elected**	**D_{43} Re-elected**	**D_{44} Re-elected**	**D_{45} Re-elected**	**D_{46} Re-elected**	**D_{47} Re-elected**	**D_{48} Re-elected**	**D_{49} Re-elected**	**D_{50} Re-elected**
**Majority →**									**D_{51} Re-elected**
**D_{60} Gain**	**D_{59} Gain**	**D_{58} Gain**	**D_{57} Gain**	**D_{56} Gain**	**D_{55} Gain**	**D_{54} Hold**	**D_{53} Hold**	**D_{52} Re-elected**	**D_{51} Re-elected**
**D_{61} Gain**	**I_{1} Re-elected**	**R_{38} Gain**	**R_{37} Gain**	**R_{36} Gain**	**R_{35} Gain**	**R_{34} Gain**	**R_{33} Gain**	**R_{32} Gain**	**R_{31} Hold**
R_{21}	R_{22}	R_{23}	R_{24}	R_{25}	R_{26}	R_{27}	**R_{28} Re-elected**	**R_{29} Re-elected**	**R_{30} Re-elected**
R_{20}	R_{19}	R_{18}	R_{17}	R_{16}	R_{15}	R_{14}	R_{13}	R_{12}	R_{11}
R_{1}	R_{2}	R_{3}	R_{4}	R_{5}	R_{6}	R_{7}	R_{8}	R_{9}	R_{10}

== 1978 ==
D_{1}	D_{2}	D_{3}	D_{4}	D_{5}	D_{6}	D_{7}	D_{8}	D_{9}	D_{10}
D_{20}	D_{19}	D_{18}	D_{17}	D_{16}	D_{15}	D_{14}	D_{13}	D_{12}	D_{11}
D_{21}	D_{22}	D_{23}	D_{24}	D_{25}	D_{26}	D_{27}	D_{28}	D_{29}	D_{30}
D_{40}	D_{39}	D_{38}	D_{37}	D_{36}	D_{35}	D_{34}	D_{33}	D_{32}	D_{31}
D_{41}	D_{42}	D_{43}	D_{44}	D_{45}	**D_{46} Ran**	**D_{47} Ran**	**D_{48} Ran**	**D_{49} Ran**	**D_{50} Ran**
**Majority →**									**D_{51} Ran**
I_{1}	**D_{59} Gain**	**D_{58} Gain**	**D_{57} Gain**	**D_{56} Gain**	**D_{55} Gain**	**D_{54} Hold**	**D_{53} Hold**	**D_{52} Hold**	**D_{51} Ran**
**R_{40} Gain**	**R_{39} Gain**	**R_{38} Gain**	**R_{37} Gain**	**R_{36} Gain**	**R_{35} Gain**	**R_{34} Gain**	**R_{33} Hold**	**R_{32} Hold**	**R_{31} Hold**
R_{21}	**R_{22} Ran**	**R_{23} Ran**	**R_{24} Ran**	**R_{25} Ran**	**R_{26} Ran**	**R_{27} Ran**	**R_{28} Ran**	**R_{29} Ran**	**R_{30} Ran**
R_{20}	R_{19}	R_{18}	R_{17}	R_{16}	R_{15}	R_{14}	R_{13}	R_{12}	R_{11}
R_{1}	R_{2}	R_{3}	R_{4}	R_{5}	R_{6}	R_{7}	R_{8}	R_{9}	R_{10}

== 1980 ==
The November 4, 1980 elections coincided with Ronald Reagan's victory in the presidential election. Reagan's large margin of victory over incumbent Jimmy Carter pulled in many Democratic voters and gave a huge boost to Republican Senate candidates.

D_{1}	D_{2}	D_{3}	D_{4}	D_{5}	D_{6}	D_{7}	D_{8}	D_{9}	D_{10}
D_{20}	D_{19}	D_{18}	D_{17}	D_{16}	D_{15}	D_{14}	D_{13}	D_{12}	D_{11}
D_{21}	D_{22}	D_{23}	D_{24}	D_{25}	D_{26}	D_{27}	D_{28}	D_{29}	D_{30}
**D_{40} Re-elected**	**D_{39} Re-elected**	**D_{38} Re-elected**	**D_{37} Re-elected**	**D_{36} Re-elected**	**D_{35} Re-elected**	D_{34}	D_{33}	D_{32}	D_{31}
**D_{41} Re-elected**	**D_{42} Re-elected**	**D_{43} Re-elected**	**D_{44} Re-elected**	**D_{45} Hold**	**D_{46} Hold**	I_{1}	**R_{53} Gain**	**R_{52} Gain**	**R_{51} Gain**
**Majority →**									**R_{51} Gain**
**R_{41} Hold**	**R_{42} Gain**	**R_{43} Gain**	**R_{44} Gain**	**R_{45} Gain**	**R_{46} Gain**	**R_{47} Gain**	**R_{48} Gain**	**R_{49} Gain**	**R_{50} Gain**
**R_{40} Hold**	**R_{39} Hold**	**R_{38} Hold**	**R_{37} Re-elected**	**R_{36} Re-elected**	**R_{35} Re-elected**	**R_{34} Re-elected**	**R_{33} Re-elected**	**R_{32} Re-elected**	R_{31}
R_{21}	R_{22}	R_{23}	R_{24}	R_{25}	R_{26}	R_{27}	R_{28}	R_{29}	R_{30}
R_{20}	R_{19}	R_{18}	R_{17}	R_{16}	R_{15}	R_{14}	R_{13}	R_{12}	R_{11}
R_{1}	R_{2}	R_{3}	R_{4}	R_{5}	R_{6}	R_{7}	R_{8}	R_{9}	R_{10}

== 1982 ==
D_{1}	D_{2}	D_{3}	D_{4}	D_{5}	D_{6}	D_{7}	D_{8}	D_{9}	D_{10}
D_{20}	D_{19}	D_{18}	D_{17}	D_{16}	D_{15}	D_{14}	D_{13}	D_{12}	D_{11}
D_{21}	D_{22}	D_{23}	D_{24}	D_{25}	D_{26}	**D_{27} Re-elected**	**D_{28} Re-elected**	**D_{29} Re-elected**	**D_{30} Re-elected**
**D_{40} Re-elected**	**D_{39} Re-elected**	**D_{38} Re-elected**	**D_{37} Re-elected**	**D_{36} Re-elected**	**D_{35} Re-elected**	**D_{34} Re-elected**	**D_{33} Re-elected**	**D_{32} Re-elected**	**D_{31} Re-elected**
**D_{41} Re-elected**	**D_{42} Re-elected**	**D_{43} Re-elected**	**D_{44} Re-elected**	**D_{45} Gain**	**D_{46} Gain**	**R_{54} Gain**	**R_{53} Gain**	**R_{52} Hold**	**R_{51} Re-elected**
**Majority →**									**R_{51} Re-elected**
R_{41}	**R_{42} Re-elected**	**R_{43} Re-elected**	**R_{44} Re-elected**	**R_{45} Re-elected**	**R_{46} Re-elected**	**R_{47} Re-elected**	**R_{48} Re-elected**	**R_{49} Re-elected**	**R_{50} Re-elected**
R_{40}	R_{39}	R_{38}	R_{37}	R_{36}	R_{35}	R_{34}	R_{33}	R_{32}	R_{31}
R_{21}	R_{22}	R_{23}	R_{24}	R_{25}	R_{26}	R_{27}	R_{28}	R_{29}	R_{30}
R_{20}	R_{19}	R_{18}	R_{17}	R_{16}	R_{15}	R_{14}	R_{13}	R_{12}	R_{11}
R_{1}	R_{2}	R_{3}	R_{4}	R_{5}	R_{6}	R_{7}	R_{8}	R_{9}	R_{10}

== 1984 ==
D_{1}	D_{2}	D_{3}	D_{4}	D_{5}	D_{6}	D_{7}	D_{8}	D_{9}	D_{10}
D_{20}	D_{19}	D_{18}	D_{17}	D_{16}	D_{15}	D_{14}	D_{13}	D_{12}	D_{11}
D_{21}	D_{22}	D_{23}	D_{24}	D_{25}	D_{26}	D_{27}	D_{28}	D_{29}	D_{30}
**D_{40} Re-elected**	**D_{39} Re-elected**	**D_{38} Re-elected**	**D_{37} Re-elected**	**D_{36} Re-elected**	**D_{35} Re-elected**	**D_{34} Re-elected**	**D_{33} Re-elected**	**D_{32} Re-elected**	D_{31}
**D_{41} Re-elected**	**D_{42} Re-elected**	**D_{43} Re-elected**	**D_{44} Hold**	**D_{45} Hold**	**D_{46} Gain**	**D_{47} Gain**	**R_{53} Gain**	**R_{52} Hold**	**R_{51} Re-elected**
**Majority →**									**R_{51} Re-elected**
**R_{41} Re-elected**	**R_{42} Re-elected**	**R_{43} Re-elected**	**R_{44} Re-elected**	**R_{45} Re-elected**	**R_{46} Re-elected**	**R_{47} Re-elected**	**R_{48} Re-elected**	**R_{49} Re-elected**	**R_{50} Re-elected**
**R_{40} Re-elected**	**R_{39} Re-elected**	**R_{38} Re-elected**	**R_{37} Re-elected**	R_{36}	R_{35}	R_{34}	R_{33}	R_{32}	R_{31}
R_{21}	R_{22}	R_{23}	R_{24}	R_{25}	R_{26}	R_{27}	R_{28}	R_{29}	R_{30}
R_{20}	R_{19}	R_{18}	R_{17}	R_{16}	R_{15}	R_{14}	R_{13}	R_{12}	R_{11}
R_{1}	R_{2}	R_{3}	R_{4}	R_{5}	R_{6}	R_{7}	R_{8}	R_{9}	R_{10}

== 1986 ==
D_{1}	D_{2}	D_{3}	D_{4}	D_{5}	D_{6}	D_{7}	D_{8}	D_{9}	D_{10}
D_{20}	D_{19}	D_{18}	D_{17}	D_{16}	D_{15}	D_{14}	D_{13}	D_{12}	D_{11}
D_{21}	D_{22}	D_{23}	D_{24}	D_{25}	D_{26}	D_{27}	D_{28}	D_{29}	D_{30}
**D_{40} Re-elected**	**D_{39} Re-elected**	**D_{38} Re-elected**	**D_{37} Re-elected**	**D_{36} Re-elected**	D_{35}	D_{34}	D_{33}	D_{32}	D_{31}
**D_{41} Re-elected**	**D_{42} Re-elected**	**D_{43} Re-elected**	**D_{44} Re-elected**	**D_{45} Hold**	**D_{46} Hold**	**D_{47} Gain**	**D_{48} Gain**	**D_{49} Gain**	**D_{50} Gain**
**Majority →**									**D_{51} Gain**
**R_{41} Re-elected**	**R_{42} Re-elected**	**R_{43} Re-elected**	**R_{44} Hold**	**R_{45} Gain**	**D_{55} Gain**	**D_{54} Gain**	**D_{53} Gain**	**D_{52} Gain**	**D_{51} Gain**
**R_{40} Re-elected**	**R_{39} Re-elected**	**R_{38} Re-elected**	**R_{37} Re-elected**	**R_{36} Re-elected**	**R_{35} Re-elected**	**R_{34} Re-elected**	**R_{33} Re-elected**	**R_{32} Re-elected**	**R_{31} Re-elected**
R_{21}	R_{22}	R_{23}	R_{24}	R_{25}	R_{26}	R_{27}	R_{28}	R_{29}	**R_{30} Re-elected**
R_{20}	R_{19}	R_{18}	R_{17}	R_{16}	R_{15}	R_{14}	R_{13}	R_{12}	R_{11}
R_{1}	R_{2}	R_{3}	R_{4}	R_{5}	R_{6}	R_{7}	R_{8}	R_{9}	R_{10}

== 1988 ==
D_{1}	D_{2}	D_{3}	D_{4}	D_{5}	D_{6}	D_{7}	D_{8}	D_{9}	D_{10}
D_{20}	D_{19}	D_{18}	D_{17}	D_{16}	D_{15}	D_{14}	D_{13}	D_{12}	D_{11}
D_{21}	D_{22}	D_{23}	D_{24}	D_{25}	D_{26}	D_{27}	D_{28}	D_{29}	D_{30}
**D_{40} Re-elected**	**D_{39} Re-elected**	**D_{38} Re-elected**	**D_{37} Re-elected**	D_{36}	D_{35}	D_{34}	D_{33}	D_{32}	D_{31}
**D_{41} Re-elected**	**D_{42} Re-elected**	**D_{43} Re-elected**	**D_{44} Re-elected**	**D_{45} Re-elected**	**D_{46} Re-elected**	**D_{47} Re-elected**	**D_{48} Re-elected**	**D_{49} Re-elected**	**D_{50} Re-elected**
**Majority →**									**D_{51} Re-elected**
**R_{41} Re-elected**	**R_{42} Re-elected**	**R_{43} Gain**	**R_{44} Gain**	**R_{45} Gain**	**D_{55} Gain**	**D_{54} Gain**	**D_{53} Gain**	**D_{52} Gain**	**D_{51} Re-elected**
**R_{40} Re-elected**	**R_{39} Re-elected**	**R_{38} Re-elected**	**R_{37} Re-elected**	**R_{36} Re-elected**	**R_{35} Re-elected**	**R_{34} Re-elected**	**R_{33} Re-elected**	**R_{32} Re-elected**	R_{31}
R_{21}	R_{22}	R_{23}	R_{24}	R_{25}	R_{26}	R_{27}	R_{28}	R_{29}	R_{30}
R_{20}	R_{19}	R_{18}	R_{17}	R_{16}	R_{15}	R_{14}	R_{13}	R_{12}	R_{11}
R_{1}	R_{2}	R_{3}	R_{4}	R_{5}	R_{6}	R_{7}	R_{8}	R_{9}	R_{10}

== 1990 ==
The elections were held November 6, 1990. Democrats increased their majority with a net gain of one seat from Republicans. The election took place in the middle of President George H. W. Bush's term, and, as with most other midterm elections, the party not holding the presidency gained seats in Congress. Only one seat changed parties in this election. Democrats would later gain a 57th seat after a Democrat was appointed to replace a Republican who had died.

D_{1}	D_{2}	D_{3}	D_{4}	D_{5}	D_{6}	D_{7}	D_{8}	D_{9}	D_{10}
D_{20}	D_{19}	D_{18}	D_{17}	D_{16}	D_{15}	D_{14}	D_{13}	D_{12}	D_{11}
D_{21}	D_{22}	D_{23}	D_{24}	D_{25}	D_{26}	D_{27}	D_{28}	D_{29}	D_{30}
**D_{40} Re-elected**	D_{39}	D_{38}	D_{37}	D_{36}	D_{35}	D_{34}	D_{33}	D_{32}	D_{31}
**D_{41} Re-elected**	**D_{42} Re-elected**	**D_{43} Re-elected**	**D_{44} Re-elected**	**D_{45} Re-elected**	**D_{46} Re-elected**	**D_{47} Re-elected**	**D_{48} Re-elected**	**D_{49} Re-elected**	**D_{50} Re-elected**
**Majority →**									**D_{51} Re-elected**
**R_{41} Re-elected**	**R_{42} Hold**	**R_{43} Hold**	**R_{44} Hold**	**D_{56} Gain**	**D_{55} Re-elected**	**D_{54} Re-elected**	**D_{53} Re-elected**	**D_{52} Re-elected**	**D_{51} Re-elected**
**R_{40} Re-elected**	**R_{39} Re-elected**	**R_{38} Re-elected**	**R_{37} Re-elected**	**R_{36} Re-elected**	**R_{35} Re-elected**	**R_{34} Re-elected**	**R_{33} Re-elected**	**R_{32} Re-elected**	**R_{31} Re-elected**
R_{21}	R_{22}	R_{23}	R_{24}	R_{25}	R_{26}	R_{27}	R_{28}	**R_{29} Re-elected**	**R_{30} Re-elected**
R_{20}	R_{19}	R_{18}	R_{17}	R_{16}	R_{15}	R_{14}	R_{13}	R_{12}	R_{11}
R_{1}	R_{2}	R_{3}	R_{4}	R_{5}	R_{6}	R_{7}	R_{8}	R_{9}	R_{10}

== 1992 ==
The elections were held November 3, 1992 and coincided with Bill Clinton's victory the presidential election. Despite the presidential victory, Democrats had a net loss of a seat in the general elections, and only managed to break even by winning a seat in a special election.

Democratic victories over Republicans John F. Seymour (of California) and Bob Kasten (of Wisconsin) were cancelled out by the defeats of Democrats Wyche Fowler (of Georgia) and Terry Sanford (of North Carolina). The election of four new Democratic women to the Senate was notable (referred to in the press as the "Year of the Woman"). Due to a special election in California, both of California's Senate seats were up for election in 1992. These seats were won by Dianne Feinstein and Barbara Boxer. As a consequence, California became the first state to have elected women to occupy both of its Senate seats.

Democrat Carol Moseley Braun (of Illinois), became the first African-American woman in the United States Senate.

D_{1}	D_{2}	D_{3}	D_{4}	D_{5}	D_{6}	D_{7}	D_{8}	D_{9}	D_{10}
D_{20}	D_{19}	D_{18}	D_{17}	D_{16}	D_{15}	D_{14}	D_{13}	D_{12}	D_{11}
D_{21}	D_{22}	D_{23}	D_{24}	D_{25}	D_{26}	D_{27}	D_{28}	D_{29}	D_{30}
**D_{40} Re-elected**	**D_{39} Re-elected**	**D_{38} Re-elected**	D_{37}	D_{36}	D_{35}	D_{34}	D_{33}	D_{32}	D_{31}
**D_{41} Re-elected**	**D_{42} Re-elected**	**D_{43} Re-elected**	**D_{44} Re-elected**	**D_{45} Re-elected**	**D_{46} Re-elected**	**D_{47} Re-elected**	**D_{48} Re-elected**	**D_{49} Hold**	**D_{50} Hold**
**Majority →**									**D_{51} Hold**
**R_{41} Hold**	**R_{42} Hold**	**R_{43} Gain**	**D_{57} Gain**	**D_{56} Gain**	**D_{55} Retired**	**D_{54} Retired**	**D_{53} Hold**	**D_{52} Hold**	**D_{51} Hold**
**R_{40} Hold**	**R_{39} Re-elected**	**R_{38} Re-elected**	**R_{37} Re-elected**	**R_{36} Re-elected**	**R_{35} Re-elected**	**R_{34} Re-elected**	**R_{33} Re-elected**	**R_{32} Re-elected**	**R_{31} Re-elected**
R_{21}	R_{22}	R_{23}	R_{24}	R_{25}	R_{26}	R_{27}	R_{28}	R_{29}	**R_{30} Re-elected**
R_{20}	R_{19}	R_{18}	R_{17}	R_{16}	R_{15}	R_{14}	R_{13}	R_{12}	R_{11}
R_{1}	R_{2}	R_{3}	R_{4}	R_{5}	R_{6}	R_{7}	R_{8}	R_{9}	R_{10}

== 1994 ==
The elections were held November 8, 1994. Republicans were able to take control of the Senate from the Democrats. In a midterm election, the opposition Republicans held the traditional advantage. Congressional Republicans campaigned against the early presidency of Bill Clinton, including his unsuccessful health care plan.

The Republican Party successfully defended all of its seats and captured eight seats from the Democrats, including the seats of sitting Senators in Pennsylvania and Tennessee, as well as six open seats in Arizona, Maine, Michigan, Ohio, Oklahoma, and Tennessee. Notably, Tennessee's Senate delegation switched from entirely Democratic to entirely Republican in a single election. This election marked the first time Republicans controlled the Senate since January 1987, and coincided with the first change of control in the House of Representatives since January 1955 and a Republican net gain of ten governorships. Collectively, these Republican gains are known as the "Republican Revolution." This was also the first time since 1980 that Republicans made net gains in the Senate, but the last time the Republicans also made gains among class 1 senators.

Initially, the balance was 52–48 in favor of the Republicans, but after the power change, two Democrats switched parties, bringing the balance to 54–46.

D_{1}	D_{2}	D_{3}	D_{4}	D_{5}	D_{6}	D_{7}	D_{8}	D_{9}	D_{10}
D_{20}	D_{19}	D_{18}	D_{17}	D_{16}	D_{15}	D_{14}	D_{13}	D_{12}	D_{11}
D_{21}	D_{22}	D_{23}	D_{24}	D_{25}	D_{26}	D_{27}	D_{28}	D_{29}	D_{30}
**D_{40} Ran**	**D_{39} Ran**	**D_{38} Ran**	**D_{37} Ran**	D_{36}	D_{35}	D_{34}	D_{33}	D_{32}	D_{31}
**D_{41} Re-elected**	**D_{42} Re-elected**	**D_{43} Re-elected**	**D_{44} Re-elected**	**D_{45} Re-elected**	**D_{46} Re-elected**	**D_{47} Re-elected**	**D_{48} Re-elected**	**R_{52} Re-elected**	**R_{51} Re-elected**
**Majority →**									**R_{51} Re-elected**
**R_{41} Re-elected**	**R_{42} Re-elected**	**R_{43} Re-elected**	**R_{44} Hold**	**R_{45} Gain**	**R_{46} Gain**	**R_{47} Gain**	**R_{48} Gain**	**R_{49} Gain**	**R_{50} Gain**
**R_{40} Re-elected**	**R_{39} Re-elected**	**R_{38} Re-elected**	**R_{37} Hold**	**R_{36} Re-elected**	**R_{35} Hold**	**R_{34} Re-elected**	**R_{33} Re-elected**	**R_{32} Re-elected**	R_{31}
R_{21}	R_{22}	R_{23}	R_{24}	R_{25}	R_{26}	R_{27}	R_{28}	R_{29}	R_{30}
R_{20}	R_{19}	R_{18}	R_{17}	R_{16}	R_{15}	R_{14}	R_{13}	R_{12}	R_{11}
R_{1}	R_{2}	R_{3}	R_{4}	R_{5}	R_{6}	R_{7}	R_{8}	R_{9}	R_{10}

== 1996 ==
The election was held November 5, 1996 and coincided with Democrat Bill Clinton's presidential re-election. Despite Clinton's re-election and his party picking up a net two seats in the House elections held the same day, the Republicans had a net gain of two seats in the Senate, following major Republican gains two years previously in the 1994 elections. As such, Clinton became the first president re-elected since Theodore Roosevelt in 1904 to win either of his terms without any Senate coattails. The Republicans captured open seats in Alabama, Arkansas, and Nebraska. In South Dakota, Democrat Tim Johnson narrowly defeated incumbent Republican Larry Pressler. The 1996 election marked the first time since 1980 that the Republican party made gains in the Senate for two consecutive election cycles.

D_{1}	D_{2}	D_{3}	D_{4}	D_{5}	D_{6}	D_{7}	D_{8}	D_{9}	D_{10}
D_{20}	D_{19}	D_{18}	D_{17}	D_{16}	D_{15}	D_{14}	D_{13}	D_{12}	D_{11}
D_{21}	D_{22}	D_{23}	D_{24}	D_{25}	D_{26}	D_{27}	D_{28}	D_{29}	D_{30}
**D_{40} Hold**	**D_{39} Re-elected**	**D_{38} Re-elected**	**D_{37} Re-elected**	**D_{36} Re-elected**	**D_{35} Re-elected**	**D_{34} Re-elected**	**D_{33} Re-elected**	D_{32}	D_{31}
**D_{41} Hold**	**D_{42} Hold**	**D_{43} Hold**	**D_{44} Hold**	**D_{45} Gain**	**R_{55} Gain**	**R_{54} Gain**	**R_{53} Hold**	**R_{52} Hold**	**R_{51} Hold**
**Majority →**									**R_{51} Hold**
**R_{41} Re-elected**	**R_{42} Re-elected**	**R_{43} Re-elected**	**R_{44} Re-elected**	**R_{45} Re-elected**	**R_{46} Re-elected**	**R_{47} Re-elected**	**R_{48} Re-elected**	**R_{49} Re-elected**	**R_{50} Hold**
**R_{40} Re-elected**	**R_{39} Re-elected**	**R_{38} Re-elected**	**R_{37} Re-elected**	**R_{36} Re-elected**	R_{35}	R_{34}	R_{33}	R_{32}	R_{31}
R_{21}	R_{22}	R_{23}	R_{24}	R_{25}	R_{26}	R_{27}	R_{28}	R_{29}	R_{30}
R_{20}	R_{19}	R_{18}	R_{17}	R_{16}	R_{15}	R_{14}	R_{13}	R_{12}	R_{11}
R_{1}	R_{2}	R_{3}	R_{4}	R_{5}	R_{6}	R_{7}	R_{8}	R_{9}	R_{10}

== 1998 ==
The November 3, 1998 elections were a roughly even contest between Republicans and Democrats. While the Democrats had to defend more seats up for election, Republican attacks on the morality of President Bill Clinton failed to connect with voters and anticipated Republican gains did not materialize. The Republicans picked up open seats in Ohio and Kentucky and narrowly defeated an incumbent senator in Illinois, but these were offset by the Democrats' gain of an open seat in Indiana and defeats of senators in New York and North Carolina. The balance of the Senate remained unchanged at 55–45 in favor of the Republicans. With Democrats gaining five seats in the House of Representatives, this marked the first time since 1934 that the out-of-Presidency party failed to gain congressional seats in a mid-term election, and the first time since 1822 that the party not in control of the White House failed to gain seats in the mid-term election of a President's second term. These are the last senate elections that resulted in no net change in the balance of power.

D_{1}	D_{2}	D_{3}	D_{4}	D_{5}	D_{6}	D_{7}	D_{8}	D_{9}	D_{10}
D_{20}	D_{19}	D_{18}	D_{17}	D_{16}	D_{15}	D_{14}	D_{13}	D_{12}	D_{11}
D_{21}	D_{22}	D_{23}	D_{24}	D_{25}	D_{26}	**D_{27} Re-elected**	**D_{28} Re-elected**	**D_{29} Re-elected**	**D_{30} Re-elected**
**D_{40} Re-elected**	**D_{39} Re-elected**	**D_{38} Re-elected**	**D_{37} Re-elected**	**D_{36} Re-elected**	**D_{35} Re-elected**	**D_{34} Re-elected**	**D_{33} Re-elected**	**D_{32} Re-elected**	**D_{31} Re-elected**
**D_{41} Re-elected**	**D_{42} Re-elected**	**D_{43} Gain**	**D_{44} Gain**	**D_{45} Gain**	**R_{55} Gain**	**R_{54} Gain**	**R_{53} Gain**	**R_{52} Re-elected**	**R_{51} Re-elected**
**Majority →**									**R_{51} Re-elected**
**R_{41} Re-elected**	**R_{42} Re-elected**	**R_{43} Re-elected**	**R_{44} Re-elected**	**R_{45} Re-elected**	**R_{46} Re-elected**	**R_{47} Re-elected**	**R_{48} Re-elected**	**R_{49} Re-elected**	**R_{50} Re-elected**
R_{40}	R_{39}	R_{38}	R_{37}	R_{36}	R_{35}	R_{34}	R_{33}	R_{32}	R_{31}
R_{21}	R_{22}	R_{23}	R_{24}	R_{25}	R_{26}	R_{27}	R_{28}	R_{29}	R_{30}
R_{20}	R_{19}	R_{18}	R_{17}	R_{16}	R_{15}	R_{14}	R_{13}	R_{12}	R_{11}
R_{1}	R_{2}	R_{3}	R_{4}	R_{5}	R_{6}	R_{7}	R_{8}	R_{9}	R_{10}

== 2000 ==
The November 7, 2000 elections coincided with the presidential election of Republican George W. Bush. It featured a number of fiercely contested elections that resulted in a victory for the Democrats, who gained a net total of four seats from Republicans. This election marked the first election year since 1988 where Democrats made net gains in the Senate.

These elections took place six years after Republicans had won a net gain of eight seats in Senate Class 1 during the elections of 1994. Democrats defeated Republican senators in Delaware, Michigan, Minnesota, Missouri, and Washington, as well as winning an open seat in Florida. In Missouri, the winner was elected posthumously. The Republicans did defeat one incumbent in Virginia and won an open seat in Nevada.

These elections resulted in an equal 50–50 split between Republicans and Democrats, meaning the Vice President would cast the tie-breaking votes in organizing the Senate. This resulted in the Democrats winning control of the Senate for only 17 days, since Al Gore was still Vice President and President of the Senate at the beginning of the new term, on January 3, 2001. But the Republicans regained control of the chamber when the new Vice President Dick Cheney was inaugurated January 20. The Republican majority would last until June 6, 2001, when a Republican Senator became an Independent and caucused with the Democrats.

These are the last elections with only Republicans and Democrats in the Senate. Starting with that Independent's party switch, there would always be at least one third-party senator.

D_{1}	D_{2}	D_{3}	D_{4}	D_{5}	D_{6}	D_{7}	D_{8}	D_{9}	D_{10}
D_{20}	D_{19}	D_{18}	D_{17}	D_{16}	D_{15}	D_{14}	D_{13}	D_{12}	D_{11}
D_{21}	D_{22}	D_{23}	D_{24}	D_{25}	D_{26}	D_{27}	D_{28}	D_{29}	D_{30}
**D_{40} Re-elected**	**D_{39} Re-elected**	**D_{38} Re-elected**	**D_{37} Re-elected**	**D_{36} Re-elected**	**D_{35} Re-elected**	**D_{34} Re-elected**	**D_{33} Re-elected**	D_{32}	D_{31}
**D_{41} Re-elected**	**D_{42} Hold**	**D_{43} Hold**	**D_{44} Hold**	**D_{45} Gain**	**D_{46} Gain**	**D_{47} Gain**	**D_{48} Gain**	**D_{49} Gain**	**D_{50} Gain**
**Majority with Democratic Vice President→**									**D_{50} Gain**
**R_{41} Re-elected**	**R_{42} Re-elected**	**R_{43} Re-elected**	**R_{44} Re-elected**	**R_{45} Re-elected**	**R_{46} Re-elected**	**R_{47} Re-elected**	**R_{48} Re-elected**	**R_{49} Gain**	**R_{50} Gain**
R_{40}	R_{39}	R_{38}	R_{37}	R_{36}	R_{35}	R_{34}	R_{33}	R_{32}	R_{31}
R_{21}	R_{22}	R_{23}	R_{24}	R_{25}	R_{26}	R_{27}	R_{28}	R_{29}	R_{30}
R_{20}	R_{19}	R_{18}	R_{17}	R_{16}	R_{15}	R_{14}	R_{13}	R_{12}	R_{11}
R_{1}	R_{2}	R_{3}	R_{4}	R_{5}	R_{6}	R_{7}	R_{8}	R_{9}	R_{10}

== 2002 ==
The November 5, 2002 elections were fiercely contested and resulted in a victory for the Republicans, who gained two seats and thus a narrow majority.

The Democrats had originally hoped to do well, as the party holding the presidency historically loses seats in midterm elections, and the Republicans had 20 seats up for election compared to 14 Democratic seats. In addition, four incumbent Republicans and no Democrats announced their retirement before the election. However, the Republicans were able to hold the four open seats, all of which were in the South. Ultimately, Republicans would pick up three seats and lose one, resulting in a net gain of two seats. Together with gains made in the House of Representatives, this election was one of the few mid-term elections in the last one hundred years in which the party in control of the White House gained Congressional seats (the others were 1902, 1934, and 1998). This was the first time since 1962 in which a first-term president's party made net gains in the Senate.

This was the most recent Senate election cycle in which at least one incumbent senator from each party lost in the general election. This was also the second consecutive mid-term election held in a president's first term in which the Republican party both had a net gain of seats and regained control of the United States Senate from the Democratic Party. This was the only election cycle ever where the party of the incumbent president gained new control of a house of Congress in a midterm election.

D_{1}	D_{2}	D_{3}	D_{4}	D_{5}	D_{6}	D_{7}	D_{8}	D_{9}	D_{10}
D_{20}	D_{19}	D_{18}	D_{17}	D_{16}	D_{15}	D_{14}	D_{13}	D_{12}	D_{11}
D_{21}	D_{22}	D_{23}	D_{24}	D_{25}	D_{26}	D_{27}	D_{28}	D_{29}	D_{30}
**D_{40} Re-elected**	**D_{39} Re-elected**	**D_{38} Re-elected**	D_{37}	D_{36}	D_{35}	D_{34}	D_{33}	D_{32}	D_{31}
**D_{41} Re-elected**	**D_{42} Re-elected**	**D_{43} Re-elected**	**D_{44} Re-elected**	**D_{45} Re-elected**	**D_{46} Re-elected**	**D_{47} Re-elected**	**D_{48} Hold**	**D_{49} Gain**	I_{1}
**Majority with Republican Vice President→**									**R_{50} Gain**
**R_{41} Re-elected**	**R_{42} Re-elected**	**R_{43} Re-elected**	**R_{44} Hold**	**R_{45} Hold**	**R_{46} Hold**	**R_{47} Hold**	**R_{48} Hold**	**R_{49} Gain**	**R_{50} Gain**
**R_{40} Re-elected**	**R_{39} Re-elected**	**R_{38} Re-elected**	**R_{37} Re-elected**	**R_{36} Re-elected**	**R_{35} Re-elected**	**R_{34} Re-elected**	**R_{33} Re-elected**	**R_{32} Re-elected**	**R_{31} Re-elected**
R_{21}	R_{22}	R_{23}	R_{24}	R_{25}	R_{26}	R_{27}	R_{28}	R_{29}	**R_{30} Re-elected**
R_{20}	R_{19}	R_{18}	R_{17}	R_{16}	R_{15}	R_{14}	R_{13}	R_{12}	R_{11}
R_{1}	R_{2}	R_{3}	R_{4}	R_{5}	R_{6}	R_{7}	R_{8}	R_{9}	R_{10}

== 2004 ==
The November 2, 2004 coincided with the presidential re-election of George W. Bush and the United States House election. This was the third consecutive election for Senate Class 3 where the Democrats failed to end up with a net gain. This also marked the first time since 1980 in which a presidential candidate from either party won with coattails in the Senate.

D_{1}	D_{2}	D_{3}	D_{4}	D_{5}	D_{6}	D_{7}	D_{8}	D_{9}	D_{10}
D_{20}	D_{19}	D_{18}	D_{17}	D_{16}	D_{15}	D_{14}	D_{13}	D_{12}	D_{11}
D_{21}	D_{22}	D_{23}	D_{24}	D_{25}	D_{26}	D_{27}	D_{28}	D_{29}	**D_{30} Re-elected**
**D_{40} Re-elected**	**D_{39} Re-elected**	**D_{38} Re-elected**	**D_{37} Re-elected**	**D_{36} Re-elected**	**D_{35} Re-elected**	**D_{34} Re-elected**	**D_{33} Re-elected**	**D_{32} Re-elected**	**D_{31} Re-elected**
**D_{41} Re-elected**	**D_{42} Re-elected**	**D_{43} Gain**	**D_{44} Gain**	I_{1}	**R_{55} Gain**	**R_{54} Gain**	**R_{53} Gain**	**R_{52} Gain**	**R_{51} Gain**
**Majority →**									**R_{51} Gain**
**R_{41} Re-elected**	**R_{42} Re-elected**	**R_{43} Re-elected**	**R_{44} Re-elected**	**R_{45} Re-elected**	**R_{46} Re-elected**	**R_{47} Re-elected**	**R_{48} Re-elected**	**R_{49} Hold**	**R_{50} Gain**
**R_{40} Re-elected**	**R_{39} Re-elected**	**R_{38} Re-elected**	**R_{37} Re-elected**	R_{36}	R_{35}	R_{34}	R_{33}	R_{32}	R_{31}
R_{21}	R_{22}	R_{23}	R_{24}	R_{25}	R_{26}	R_{27}	R_{28}	R_{29}	R_{30}
R_{20}	R_{19}	R_{18}	R_{17}	R_{16}	R_{15}	R_{14}	R_{13}	R_{12}	R_{11}
R_{1}	R_{2}	R_{3}	R_{4}	R_{5}	R_{6}	R_{7}	R_{8}	R_{9}	R_{10}

== 2006 ==
The November 7, 2006 elections were part of the Democratic sweep of the 2006 elections, in which Democrats made numerous gains and no Congressional or gubernatorial seat held by a Democrat was won by a Republican. Six Republican incumbents were defeated by Democrats. An incumbent lost his Democratic primary, but created his own party and won re-election. Democrats kept their two open seats and Republicans held onto their lone open seat. An Independent was elected to replace an Independent.Two new women were elected to seats previously held by men. This brought the total number of female senators to an all-time high of 16. Following the elections, no party held a majority of seats for the first time since January 1955. The Democrats were able to control the chamber because the two Independents caucused with the Democrats. The Democrats needed at least 51 seats to control the Senate because Vice President Dick Cheney would have broken any 50–50 tie in favor of the Republicans.

D_{1}	D_{2}	D_{3}	D_{4}	D_{5}	D_{6}	D_{7}	D_{8}	D_{9}	D_{10}
D_{20}	D_{19}	D_{18}	D_{17}	D_{16}	D_{15}	D_{14}	D_{13}	D_{12}	D_{11}
D_{21}	D_{22}	D_{23}	D_{24}	D_{25}	D_{26}	D_{27}	**D_{28} Re-elected**	**D_{29} Re-elected**	**D_{30} Re-elected**
**D_{40} Re-elected**	**D_{39} Re-elected**	**D_{38} Re-elected**	**D_{37} Re-elected**	**D_{36} Re-elected**	**D_{35} Re-elected**	**D_{34} Re-elected**	**D_{33} Re-elected**	**D_{32} Re-elected**	**D_{31} Re-elected**
**D_{41} Re-elected**	**D_{42} Hold**	**D_{43} Hold**	**D_{44} Gain**	**D_{45} Gain**	**D_{46} Gain**	**D_{47} Gain**	**D_{48} Gain**	**D_{49} Gain**	**I_{2} Re-elected; New party**
**Majority (with Independents) ↑**									**I_{1} Hold**
**R_{41} Re-elected**	**R_{42} Re-elected**	**R_{43} Re-elected**	**R_{44} Re-elected**	**R_{45} Re-elected**	**R_{46} Re-elected**	**R_{47} Re-elected**	**R_{48} Re-elected**	**R_{49} Hold**	**I_{1} Hold**
R_{40}	R_{39}	R_{38}	R_{37}	R_{36}	R_{35}	R_{34}	R_{33}	R_{32}	R_{31}
R_{21}	R_{22}	R_{23}	R_{24}	R_{25}	R_{26}	R_{27}	R_{28}	R_{29}	R_{30}
R_{20}	R_{19}	R_{18}	R_{17}	R_{16}	R_{15}	R_{14}	R_{13}	R_{12}	R_{11}
R_{1}	R_{2}	R_{3}	R_{4}	R_{5}	R_{6}	R_{7}	R_{8}	R_{9}	R_{10}

== 2008 ==
Going into the November 4, 2008 elections, the Senate had 49 Democrats, 49 Republicans, and 2 Independents who caucused with the Democrats, giving the Democratic caucus the slightest 51–49 majority. Of the seats up for election in 2008, 23 were held by Republicans and 12 by Democrats. The Republicans, who openly conceded early on that they wouldn't be able to regain the majority, lost eight seats. This election was the second cycle in a row in which no seats switched from Democratic to Republican. In addition, this was the largest Democratic Senate gain since 1986, when they also won eight seats. Finally, these elections marked the first time since 1964 in which a Democratic presidential candidate won the White House with Senate coattails.

When the new senators were first sworn in, the balance was 58–41 in favor of the Democrats, because of the unresolved Senate election in Minnesota. The April 2009 defection of a Republican to the Democratic party and the July 2009 resolution of the Minnesota election in favor of the Democrat increased the Democratic majority to 60–40. Republicans gained a seat in a January 2010 special election in Massachusetts, making the balance 59–41 before the start of the next election cycle.

D_{1}	D_{2}	D_{3}	D_{4}	D_{5}	D_{6}	D_{7}	D_{8}	D_{9}	D_{10}
D_{20}	D_{19}	D_{18}	D_{17}	D_{16}	D_{15}	D_{14}	D_{13}	D_{12}	D_{11}
D_{21}	D_{22}	D_{23}	D_{24}	D_{25}	D_{26}	D_{27}	D_{28}	D_{29}	D_{30}
**D_{40} Re-elected**	**D_{39} Re-elected**	**D_{38} Re-elected**	D_{37}	D_{36}	D_{35}	D_{34}	D_{33}	D_{32}	D_{31}
**D_{41} Re-elected**	**D_{42} Re-elected**	**D_{43} Re-elected**	**D_{44} Re-elected**	**D_{45} Re-elected**	**D_{46} Re-elected**	**D_{47} Re-elected**	**D_{48} Re-elected**	**D_{49} Re-elected**	**D_{50} Gain**
**Majority →**									**D_{51} Gain**
**R_{41} Hold**	I_{2}	I_{1}	**D_{57} Gain**	**D_{56} Gain**	**D_{55} Gain**	**D_{54} Gain**	**D_{53} Gain**	**D_{52} Gain**	**D_{51} Gain**
**R_{40} Hold**	**R_{39} Re-elected**	**R_{38} Re-elected**	**R_{37} Re-elected**	**R_{36} Re-elected**	**R_{35} Re-elected**	**R_{34} Re-elected**	**R_{33} Re-elected**	**R_{32} Re-elected**	**R_{31} Re-elected**
R_{21}	R_{22}	R_{23}	R_{24}	R_{25}	R_{26}	R_{27}	R_{28}	**R_{29} Re-elected**	**R_{30} Re-elected**
R_{20}	R_{19}	R_{18}	R_{17}	R_{16}	R_{15}	R_{14}	R_{13}	R_{12}	R_{11}
R_{1}	R_{2}	R_{3}	R_{4}	R_{5}	R_{6}	R_{7}	R_{8}	R_{9}	R_{10}

== 2010 ==
The November 2, 2010 elections featured 19 incumbent Democrats (7 of whom retired or were defeated in the primary) and 18 incumbent Republicans (eight of whom retired or were defeated in the primary). Republicans won four seats held by retiring Democrats and Republicans defeated two incumbent Democrats, for a Republican net gain of six seats. This was the largest number of Republican net gains since the 1994 elections and also the first time since that election that Republicans successfully defended all of their own seats. This was the fourth consecutive election of "Class 3" senators where Democrats failed to gain seats and the third consecutive mid-term election held in a president's first term where Republicans picked up seats. Despite Republican gains, the Democrats retained a majority of the Senate with 51 seats plus 2 independents who caucused with them, compared to the 47 Republican seats.

D_{1}	D_{2}	D_{3}	D_{4}	D_{5}	D_{6}	D_{7}	D_{8}	D_{9}	D_{10}
D_{20}	D_{19}	D_{18}	D_{17}	D_{16}	D_{15}	D_{14}	D_{13}	D_{12}	D_{11}
D_{21}	D_{22}	D_{23}	D_{24}	D_{25}	D_{26}	D_{27}	D_{28}	D_{29}	D_{30}
D_{40}	D_{39}	D_{38}	D_{37}	D_{36}	D_{35}	D_{34}	D_{33}	D_{32}	D_{31}
D_{41}	**D_{42} Re-elected**	**D_{43} Re-elected**	**D_{44} Re-elected**	**D_{45} Re-elected**	**D_{46} Re-elected**	**D_{47} Re-elected**	**D_{48} Re-elected**	**D_{49} Re-elected**	**D_{50} Hold**
**Majority →**									**D_{51} Ran**
**R_{41} Hold**	**R_{42} Gain**	**R_{43} Gain**	**R_{44} Gain**	**R_{45} Gain**	**R_{46} Gain**	**R_{47} Gain**	I_{2}	I_{1}	**D_{51} Ran**
**R_{40} Hold**	**R_{39} Hold**	**R_{38} Hold**	**R_{37} Hold**	**R_{36} Hold**	**R_{35} Hold**	**R_{34} Re-elected**	**R_{33} Re-elected**	**R_{32} Re-elected**	**R_{31} Re-elected**
R_{21}	R_{22}	**R_{23} Re-elected**	**R_{24} Re-elected**	**R_{25} Re-elected**	**R_{26} Re-elected**	**R_{27} Re-elected**	**R_{28} Re-elected**	**R_{29} Re-elected**	**R_{30} Re-elected**
R_{20}	R_{19}	R_{18}	R_{17}	R_{16}	R_{15}	R_{14}	R_{13}	R_{12}	R_{11}
R_{1}	R_{2}	R_{3}	R_{4}	R_{5}	R_{6}	R_{7}	R_{8}	R_{9}	R_{10}

== 2012 ==
In the November 6, 2012 elections, Democrats had 21 seats up for election, plus 1 Independent and 1 Independent Democrat (who both caucused with the Democrats), while the Republicans had only 10 seats up for election. The Democrats gained a net of 2 seats including a gain from the Independent Democrat, leaving them with a total of 53 seats. The Republicans lost a net of 2 seats, ending with a total of 45 seats. The Independent retained a lone seat and gained a seat from the Republicans, bringing their total to 2 seats. The Independents would caucus with the Democrats, so that majority caucus had a combined total of 55 seats. This was the third consecutive election of "Class 1" senators where Democrats gained seats. This was the third consecutive Senate election held in a presidential election year where the party belonging to the winning presidential candidate gained seats. This was the first time since 1936 where a Democratic presidential candidate who won a second term also had Senate coattails in both occasions (although Franklin Roosevelt won a third and fourth term in 1940 and 1944 respectively, he lost Senate seats on both occasions). This was the first time since 1964 in which either party had to defend more than two-thirds of the Senate seats up for grabs, but managed to make net gains.

D_{1}	D_{2}	D_{3}	D_{4}	D_{5}	D_{6}	D_{7}	D_{8}	D_{9}	D_{10}
D_{20}	D_{19}	D_{18}	D_{17}	D_{16}	D_{15}	D_{14}	D_{13}	D_{12}	D_{11}
D_{21}	D_{22}	D_{23}	D_{24}	D_{25}	D_{26}	D_{27}	D_{28}	D_{29}	D_{30}
**D_{40} Re-elected**	**D_{39} Re-elected**	**D_{38} Re-elected**	**D_{37} Re-elected**	**D_{36} Re-elected**	**D_{35} Re-elected**	**D_{34} Re-elected**	**D_{33} Re-elected**	**D_{32} Re-elected**	**D_{31} Re-elected**
**D_{41} Re-elected**	**D_{42} Re-elected**	**D_{43} Re-elected**	**D_{44} Re-elected**	**D_{45} Re-elected**	**D_{46} Hold**	**D_{47} Hold**	**D_{48} Hold**	**D_{49} Hold**	**D_{50} Hold**
**Majority →**									**D_{51} Gain**
**R_{41} Re-elected**	**R_{42} Re-elected**	**R_{43} Hold**	**R_{44} Hold**	**R_{45} Gain**	**I_{2} Gain**	**I_{1} Re-elected**	**D_{53} Gain**	**D_{52} Gain**	**D_{51} Gain**
**R_{40} Re-elected**	**R_{39} Re-elected**	**R_{38} Re-elected**	R_{37}	R_{36}	R_{35}	R_{34}	R_{33}	R_{32}	R_{31}
R_{21}	R_{22}	R_{23}	R_{24}	R_{25}	R_{26}	R_{27}	R_{28}	R_{29}	R_{30}
R_{20}	R_{19}	R_{18}	R_{17}	R_{16}	R_{15}	R_{14}	R_{13}	R_{12}	R_{11}
R_{1}	R_{2}	R_{3}	R_{4}	R_{5}	R_{6}	R_{7}	R_{8}	R_{9}	R_{10}

== 2014 ==
D_{1}	D_{2}	D_{3}	D_{4}	D_{5}	D_{6}	D_{7}	D_{8}	D_{9}	D_{10}
D_{20}	D_{19}	D_{18}	D_{17}	D_{16}	D_{15}	D_{14}	D_{13}	D_{12}	D_{11}
D_{21}	D_{22}	D_{23}	D_{24}	D_{25}	D_{26}	D_{27}	D_{28}	D_{29}	D_{30}
**D_{40} Re-elected**	**D_{39} Re-elected**	**D_{38} Re-elected**	**D_{37} Re-elected**	**D_{36} Re-elected**	**D_{35} Re-elected**	**D_{34} Re-elected**	**D_{33} Re-elected**	D_{32}	D_{31}
**D_{41} Re-elected**	**D_{42} Re-elected**	**D_{43} Re-elected**	**D_{44} Hold**	I_{1}	I_{2}	**R_{54} Gain**	**R_{53} Gain**	**R_{52} Gain**	**R_{51} Gain**
**Majority →**									**R_{51} Gain**
**R_{41} Re-elected**	**R_{42} Re-elected**	**R_{43} Hold**	**R_{44} Hold**	**R_{45} Hold**	**R_{46} Gain**	**R_{47} Gain**	**R_{48} Gain**	**R_{49} Gain**	**R_{50} Gain**
**R_{40} Re-elected**	**R_{39} Re-elected**	**R_{38} Re-elected**	**R_{37} Re-elected**	**R_{36} Re-elected**	**R_{35} Re-elected**	**R_{34} Re-elected**	**R_{33} Re-elected**	**R_{32} Re-elected**	**R_{31} Re-elected**
R_{21}	R_{22}	R_{23}	R_{24}	R_{25}	R_{26}	R_{27}	R_{28}	R_{29}	R_{30}
R_{20}	R_{19}	R_{18}	R_{17}	R_{16}	R_{15}	R_{14}	R_{13}	R_{12}	R_{11}
R_{1}	R_{2}	R_{3}	R_{4}	R_{5}	R_{6}	R_{7}	R_{8}	R_{9}	R_{10}

== 2016 ==
The November 8, 2016 elections were held with the presidential election of Donald Trump. 34 seats were contested. Republicans held the Senate majority with 54 seats before this election. Democrats won a net gain of two seats. Only two incumbents lost their seats and 2016 marked the first time since 1986 that Democrats made a net gain of seats in class 3. This is the first and only election since the passage of the Seventeenth Amendment in 1913 where the winning party in every Senate election mirrored the winning party for their state in the presidential election. This election marks the first time since 2000 in which the party in opposition to the elected or re-elected presidential candidate made net gains in the Senate, with both cases being a Republican president and Democratic gains in the Senate. Also in both cases, the president won in the electoral college but lost the popular vote.

D_{1}	D_{2}	D_{3}	D_{4}	D_{5}	D_{6}	D_{7}	D_{8}	D_{9}	D_{10}
D_{20}	D_{19}	D_{18}	D_{17}	D_{16}	D_{15}	D_{14}	D_{13}	D_{12}	D_{11}
D_{21}	D_{22}	D_{23}	D_{24}	D_{25}	D_{26}	D_{27}	D_{28}	D_{29}	D_{30}
**D_{40} Re-elected**	**D_{39} Re-elected**	**D_{38} Re-elected**	**D_{37} Re-elected**	**D_{36} Re-elected**	**D_{35} Re-elected**	D_{34}	D_{33}	D_{32}	D_{31}
**D_{41} Re-elected**	**D_{42} Hold**	**D_{43} Hold**	**D_{44} Hold**	**D_{45} Gain**	**D_{46} Gain**	I_{1}	I_{2}	**R_{52} Hold**	**R_{51} Hold**
**Majority →**									**R_{51} Hold**
**R_{41} Re-elected**	**R_{42} Re-elected**	**R_{43} Re-elected**	**R_{44} Re-elected**	**R_{45} Re-elected**	**R_{46} Re-elected**	**R_{47} Re-elected**	**R_{48} Re-elected**	**R_{49} Re-elected**	**R_{50} Re-elected**
**R_{40} Re-elected**	**R_{39} Re-elected**	**R_{38} Re-elected**	**R_{37} Re-elected**	**R_{36} Re-elected**	**R_{35} Re-elected**	**R_{34} Re-elected**	**R_{33} Re-elected**	**R_{32} Re-elected**	**R_{31} Re-elected**
R_{21}	R_{22}	R_{23}	R_{24}	R_{25}	R_{26}	R_{27}	R_{28}	R_{29}	R_{30}
R_{20}	R_{19}	R_{18}	R_{17}	R_{16}	R_{15}	R_{14}	R_{13}	R_{12}	R_{11}
R_{1}	R_{2}	R_{3}	R_{4}	R_{5}	R_{6}	R_{7}	R_{8}	R_{9}	R_{10}

== 2018 ==
Elections were held November 6, 2018, for all 33 Class 1 seats, along with two special elections for the Class 2 seats of Minnesota and Mississippi. Republicans expanded their majority, defeating four Democratic incumbents in Florida, Indiana, Missouri, and North Dakota. However, Democrats made gains in Arizona and Nevada, and defended competitive seats in states won by Donald Trump in the 2016 presidential election, such as Michigan, Montana, Ohio, and West Virginia, the latter of which was a major upset.

D_{1}	D_{2}	D_{3}	D_{4}	D_{5}	D_{6}	D_{7}	D_{8}	D_{9}	D_{10}
D_{20}	D_{19}	D_{18}	D_{17}	D_{16}	D_{15}	D_{14}	D_{13}	D_{12}	D_{11}
D_{21}	D_{22}	D_{23}	D_{24}	**D_{25} Re-elected**	**D_{26} Re-elected**	**D_{27} Re-elected**	**D_{28} Re-elected**	**D_{29} Re-elected**	**D_{30} Re-elected**
**D_{40} Re-elected**	**D_{39} Re-elected**	**D_{38} Re-elected**	**D_{37} Re-elected**	**D_{36} Re-elected**	**D_{35} Re-elected**	**D_{34} Re-elected**	**D_{33} Re-elected**	**D_{32} Re-elected**	**D_{31} Re-elected**
**D_{41} Re-elected**	**D_{42} Re-elected**	**D_{43} Re-elected**	**D_{44} Gain**	**D_{45} Gain**	**I_{1} Re-elected**	**I_{2} Re-elected**	**R_{53} Gain**	**R_{52} Gain**	**R_{51} Gain**
**Majority →**									**R_{51} Gain**
R_{41}	R_{42}	R_{43}	**R_{44} Re-elected**	**R_{45} Re-elected**	**R_{46} Re-elected**	**R_{47} Re-elected**	**R_{48} Hold**	**R_{49} Hold**	**R_{50} Gain**
R_{40}	R_{39}	R_{38}	R_{37}	R_{36}	R_{35}	R_{34}	R_{33}	R_{32}	R_{31}
R_{21}	R_{22}	R_{23}	R_{24}	R_{25}	R_{26}	R_{27}	R_{28}	R_{29}	R_{30}
R_{20}	R_{19}	R_{18}	R_{17}	R_{16}	R_{15}	R_{14}	R_{13}	R_{12}	R_{11}
R_{1}	R_{2}	R_{3}	R_{4}	R_{5}	R_{6}	R_{7}	R_{8}	R_{9}	R_{10}

== 2020 ==
Elections were held November 3, 2020, with the 33 Class 2 seats being contested, along with special elections for the Class 3 seats of Arizona and Georgia. Democrats made gains in Arizona and Colorado, while Republicans flipped the Alabama seat that was lost to them in the 2017 special election. The two concurrent elections in Georgia were left to runoffs due to the state's two-round system, which were held on January 5, 2021. Control of the Senate was not known until these highly competitive elections were held, as neither party had gained a majority of seats after the elections. In the runoffs, Democrats gained both seats and thus narrow control of the Senate due to the election of Vice President Kamala Harris, who has the ability to cast tie-breaking votes.

D_{1}	D_{2}	D_{3}	D_{4}	D_{5}	D_{6}	D_{7}	D_{8}	D_{9}	D_{10}
D_{20}	D_{19}	D_{18}	D_{17}	D_{16}	D_{15}	D_{14}	D_{13}	D_{12}	D_{11}
D_{21}	D_{22}	D_{23}	D_{24}	D_{25}	D_{26}	D_{27}	D_{28}	D_{29}	D_{30}
**D_{40} Re-elected**	**D_{39} Re-elected**	**D_{38} Re-elected**	**D_{37} Re-elected**	**D_{36} Re-elected**	**D_{35} Re-elected**	**D_{34} Re-elected**	D_{33}	D_{32}	D_{31}
**D_{41} Re-elected**	**D_{42} Re-elected**	**D_{43} Re-elected**	**D_{44} Hold**	**D_{45} Gain**	**D_{46} Gain**	**D_{47} Gain**	**D_{48} Gain**	I_{1}	I_{2}
**Majority (with independents and vice president) (Note: As the two independents senators (Angus King and Bernie Sanders) have caucused with the Democratic Party since joining the Senate, the Democratic caucus consists of 50 seats, which became a working majority once the presidency of Joe Biden began on January 20, with Vice President Kamala Harris casting tie-breaking votes.) ↑**									I_{2}
**Majority (with independents and vice president) ↑**									**R_{50} Gain**
**R_{41} Re-elected**	**R_{42} Re-elected**	**R_{43} Re-elected**	**R_{44} Re-elected**	**R_{45} Re-elected**	**R_{46} Re-elected**	**R_{47} Hold**	**R_{48} Hold**	**R_{49} Hold**	**R_{50} Gain**
**R_{40} Re-elected**	**R_{39} Re-elected**	**R_{38} Re-elected**	**R_{37} Re-elected**	**R_{36} Re-elected**	**R_{35} Re-elected**	**R_{34} Re-elected**	**R_{33} Re-elected**	**R_{32} Re-elected**	**R_{31} Re-elected**
R_{30}	R_{29}	R_{28}	R_{27}	R_{26}	R_{25}	R_{24}	R_{23}	R_{22}	R_{21}
R_{20}	R_{19}	R_{18}	R_{17}	R_{16}	R_{15}	R_{14}	R_{13}	R_{12}	R_{11}
R_{1}	R_{2}	R_{3}	R_{4}	R_{5}	R_{6}	R_{7}	R_{8}	R_{9}	R_{10}

== 2022 ==
Elections were held on November 8, 2022, with all 34 Class 3 seats up for election, along with a special election for Oklahoma's Class 2 seat. Democrats gained an open seat in Pennsylvania while retaining their 14 seats in this class, while Republicans held their remaining 20 seats. This was the first election since 2012 in which the Senate Democratic Caucus won an outright majority, and the first since 1990 in which only one seat changed party hands.

D_{1}	D_{2}	D_{3}	D_{4}	D_{5}	D_{6}	D_{7}	D_{8}	D_{9}	D_{10}
D_{20}	D_{19}	D_{18}	D_{17}	D_{16}	D_{15}	D_{14}	D_{13}	D_{12}	D_{11}
D_{21}	D_{22}	D_{23}	D_{24}	D_{25}	D_{26}	D_{27}	D_{28}	D_{29}	D_{30}
**D_{40} Re-elected**	**D_{39} Re-elected**	**D_{38} Re-elected**	**D_{37} Re-elected**	**D_{36} Re-elected**	**D_{35} Re-elected**	D_{34}	D_{33}	D_{32}	D_{31}
**D_{41} Re-elected**	**D_{42} Re-elected**	**D_{43} Re-elected**	**D_{44} Re-elected**	**D_{45} Re-elected**	**D_{46} Re-elected**	**D_{47} Elected**	**D_{48} Hold**	**D_{49} Gain**	I_{1}
**Majority (with independents) (Note: As the two independent senators (Angus King and Bernie Sanders) have caucused with the Democratic Party since joining the Senate, the Democratic caucus consists of 51 seats.) →**									I_{1}
**R_{41} Re-elected**	**R_{42} Re-elected**	**R_{43} Re-elected**	**R_{44} Re-elected**	**R_{45} Hold**	**R_{46} Hold**	**R_{47} Hold**	**R_{48} Hold**	**R_{49} Hold**	I_{2}
**R_{40} Re-elected**	**R_{39} Re-elected**	**R_{38} Re-elected**	**R_{37} Re-elected**	**R_{36} Re-elected**	**R_{35} Re-elected**	**R_{34} Re-elected**	**R_{33} Re-elected**	**R_{32} Re-elected**	**R_{31} Re-elected**
R_{21}	R_{22}	R_{23}	R_{24}	R_{25}	R_{26}	R_{27}	R_{28}	R_{29}	**R_{30} Re-elected**
R_{20}	R_{19}	R_{18}	R_{17}	R_{16}	R_{15}	R_{14}	R_{13}	R_{12}	R_{11}
R_{1}	R_{2}	R_{3}	R_{4}	R_{5}	R_{6}	R_{7}	R_{8}	R_{9}	R_{10}

== 2024 ==
Elections were held on November 5, 2024, with all 33 Class 1 seats up for election, along with a special election for Nebraska's Class 2 seat.

D_{1}	D_{2}	D_{3}	D_{4}	D_{5}	D_{6}	D_{7}	D_{8}	D_{9}	D_{10}
D_{20}	D_{19}	D_{18}	D_{17}	D_{16}	D_{15}	D_{14}	D_{13}	D_{12}	D_{11}
D_{21}	D_{22}	D_{23}	D_{24}	D_{25}	D_{26}	D_{27}	D_{28}	**D_{29} Hold**	**D_{30} Re-elected**
**D_{40} Re-elected**	**D_{39} Re-elected**	**D_{38} Hold**	**D_{37} Re-elected**	**D_{36} Re-elected**	**D_{35} Hold**	**D_{34} Re-elected**	**D_{33} Hold**	**D_{32} Re-elected**	**D_{31} Hold**
**D_{41} Re-elected**	**D_{42} Re-elected**	**D_{43} Re-elected**	**D_{44} Re-elected**	**D_{45} Gain**	**I_{1} Re-elected**	**I_{2} Re-elected**	**R_{53} Gain**	**R_{52} Gain**	**R_{51} Gain**
**Majority →**									**R_{51} Gain**
**R_{41} Re-elected**	**R_{42} Re-elected**	**R_{43} Re-elected**	**R_{44} Elected (Note: Appointee elected)**	**R_{45} Re-elected**	**R_{46} Re-elected**	**R_{47} Re-elected**	**R_{48} Hold**	**R_{49} Re-elected**	**R_{50} Gain**
**R_{40} Hold**	**R_{39} Re-elected**	R_{38}	R_{37}	R_{36}	R_{35}	R_{34}	R_{33}	R_{32}	R_{31}
R_{21}	R_{22}	R_{23}	R_{24}	R_{25}	R_{26}	R_{27}	R_{28}	R_{29}	R_{30}
R_{20}	R_{19}	R_{18}	R_{17}	R_{16}	R_{15}	R_{14}	R_{13}	R_{12}	R_{11}
R_{1}	R_{2}	R_{3}	R_{4}	R_{5}	R_{6}	R_{7}	R_{8}	R_{9}	R_{10}

== See also ==
- List of elections in the United States
