= Jim Sasser =

American politician (1936–2024)

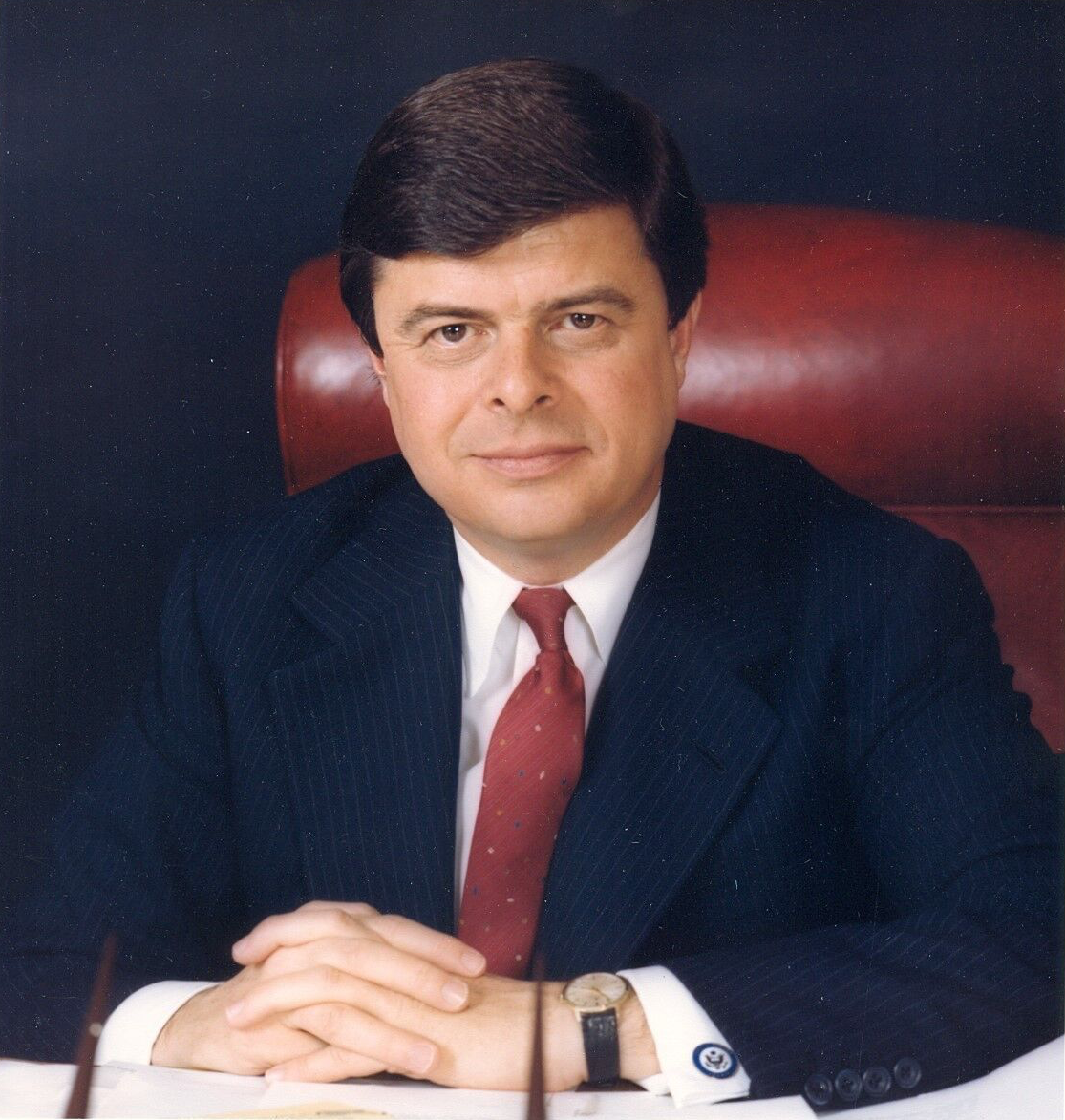
- Official portrait, 1986

6th United States Ambassador to China
- In office February 14, 1996 – July 1, 1999
- President: Bill Clinton
- Preceded by: J. Stapleton Roy
- Succeeded by: Joseph Prueher

United States Senator from Tennessee
- In office January 3, 1977 – January 3, 1995
- Preceded by: Bill Brock
- Succeeded by: Bill Frist
Committee chairmanships
Chair of the Senate Budget Committee
In office January 3, 1989 – January 3, 1995
Preceded by	Lawton Chiles
Succeeded by	Pete Domenici

Personal details
- Born: James Ralph Sasser; September 30, 1936 Memphis, Tennessee, U.S.
- Died: September 10, 2024 (aged 87) Chapel Hill, North Carolina, U.S.
- Party: Democratic
- Spouse: Mary Gorman (m. 1962)
- Children: 2
- Education: University of Tennessee; Vanderbilt University (BA, LLB)

Military service
- Allegiance: United States
- Branch/service: United States Marine Corps
- Years of service: 1957–1963
- Unit: Reserve
- Sasser's voice Sasser describes the effects of the Gulf War on Iraq's imports and exports Recorded January 11, 1991

James Ralph Sasser (September 30, 1936 – September 10, 2024) was an American politician, diplomat, and attorney from Tennessee. A member of the Democratic Party, he served three terms as a member of the United States Senate from 1977 to 1995, and was Chairman of the United States Senate Committee on the Budget. From 1996 to 1999, during the Clinton administration, he was the United States Ambassador to China. As of 2025, he was the most recent Democratic U.S. senator from Tennessee.

== Early life and career ==
James Ralph Sasser was born in Memphis, Tennessee, on September 30, 1936. He attended public schools in Nashville, Tennessee, graduating from Hillsboro High School in 1954. He attended the University of Tennessee from 1954 to 1955, where he joined the Lambda chapter of Kappa Sigma fraternity. He earned his undergraduate degree from Vanderbilt University in 1958, followed by his law degree from the Vanderbilt University Law School in 1961. He was admitted to the Tennessee Bar in 1961 and began practicing law in Nashville.

From 1957 to 1963, he served in the United States Marine Corps Reserve.

Sasser was a long time Democratic activist and the manager of Albert Gore Sr.'s unsuccessful 1970 reelection campaign. A lawyer by trade, Sasser sought election in his own right and won his party's 1976 nomination for the United States Senate. He defeated, among others, Nashville, Tennessee entrepreneur and attorney John Jay Hooker, then still considered to be a serious candidate due to his strong personality, his (intermittent) wealth, and his connections with The Tennessean's controlling Seigenthaler family. His son Gray Sasser, also a lawyer, is a past chair of the Tennessee Democratic Party.

== Senate campaigns ==
=== 1976 election ===
Upon winning his party's Senate nomination, Sasser set out to attack the record of one-term incumbent Sen. Bill Brock, heir to a Chattanooga, Tennessee candy fortune. Sasser emphasized Brock's connections to former President Richard Nixon and his use of income tax code provisions that had, despite his great wealth and considerable income, resulted in his paying less than $2,000 in income tax the previous year. Sasser was able to capitalize on the tax issue by pointing out that Brock had paid less than many Tennesseans of considerably more modest means.

Sasser's campaign was also greatly aided by the efforts of ex-Senator Gore. Brock had defeated the elder Gore for the Senate in 1970 largely upon the basis of Gore's opposition to the Vietnam War. Sasser won handily over Brock, and went on to serve three terms in the Senate.

=== Re-election, 1982 and 1988 ===
Sasser turned back a serious effort against him by five-term United States House of Representatives member Robin Beard very handily in 1982. That showing was so impressive that his 1988 Republican opponent was a virtual political unknown named Bill Andersen, whose underfunded, essentially token campaign never stood a chance.

=== 1994 re-election campaign ===
There were two unforeseen events that negated Sasser's popularity. Some Tennessee voters were discontented with the first two years of the Bill Clinton administration, especially the proposal for a national health-care system largely put together and advocated by Clinton's wife, Hillary Clinton, as well as the passage of the Federal Assault Weapons Ban. The other was the somewhat unexpected nomination of Nashville, Tennessee heart transplantation surgeon Bill Frist for the seat by the Republicans.

Frist was a political unknown and a total novice (who never voted until he was 36) at campaigning, but was from one of Nashville's most prominent and wealthiest medical families, which gave him name recognition, especially in the Nashville area, and resources adequate to match the campaign war chest built up by a typical three-term incumbent, a challenge most "insurgent" candidates find to be extremely difficult. A further factor working to Frist's advantage was a simultaneous Republican campaign by actor and attorney Fred Thompson for the other Tennessee Senate seat, which was held to replace Al Gore, who had resigned in 1993 to become Vice President of the United States. To an extent, Frist was able to bask in the reflected glory of this formidable stage presence, and additionally developed some campaigning skills, which were almost totally absent in the early stages of his campaign. Another factor in Frist's favor was that Sasser was never seen as possessing much charisma of his own. During the campaign Nashville radio stations were derisive towards Sasser to the point of stating that he could only win "a Kermit the Frog lookalike contest." In one of the largest upsets in a night of political upsets in the November 1994 U.S. general elections, Sasser lost his seat to Frist by 211,062 votes. Sasser and Pennsylvania's Harris Wofford were the only incumbents to lose re-election in the 1994 cycle. As of 2024, Sasser is the last Democrat to have represented Tennessee in the U.S. Senate.

== Senate accomplishments ==
With the retirement of Senator Lawton Chiles in 1989, Sasser became Chairman of the Senate Budget Committee. In that role, he served as a key ally of Senate Majority Leader George J. Mitchell, a senator of Maine. Sasser helped negotiate the 1990 budget summit agreement with President George H. W. Bush. In 1993 he engineered passage of President Bill Clinton's first budget, which reduced the deficit by $500 billion over 10 years but passed without any Republican votes.

With these successes, Sasser began to work his way upward in the party leadership. When then-Senate Majority Leader Mitchell announced his intention to retire, Sasser was widely expected to be elected to the position, had he won a fourth term in the Senate.

== Ambassador to China ==
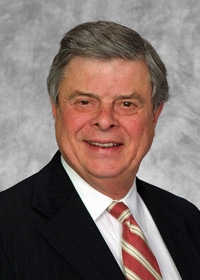
Official photograph of Sasser as United States Ambassador to China.

Sasser went on to serve as ambassador to China during the period of alleged nuclear spying and the campaign finance controversy that involved possible efforts by China to influence domestic U.S. politics during the Clinton Administration. Sasser again gained media attention when the U.S. Embassy in Beijing was besieged after U.S. warplanes mistakenly bombed the Chinese embassy in Belgrade during the U.S. intervention in the Kosovo War. Shortly after the siege of the embassy was lifted, Ambassador Sasser retired (he was slated to do so before the siege, so his retirement was not a direct result) and returned to the United States.

== Later career ==
After retiring as ambassador, Sasser worked as a consultant in Tennessee and Washington, D.C., and also lectured at George Washington University. He later became a professor at the University of North Carolina at Chapel Hill.

== Personal life and death ==
Sasser married Mary Gorman in 1962, and they had two children. He died from a heart attack at his home in Chapel Hill, North Carolina, on September 10, 2024, at the age of 87, 20 days before his 88th birthday.

== Electoral history ==
- 1976 Democratic Primary for U.S. Senate (TN)
  - Jim Sasser, 44%
  - John Jay Hooker, 31%
  - Harry Sadler, 10%
  - David Bolin, 8%
- 1976 General Election for U.S. Senate (TN)
  - Jim Sasser (D), 52%
  - Bill Brock (R) (inc.), 47%
- 1982 General Election for U.S. Senate (TN)
  - Jim Sasser (D) (inc.), 62%
  - Robin Beard (R), 38%
- 1988 General Election for U.S. Senate (TN)
  - Jim Sasser (D) (inc.), 65%
  - Bill Andersen (R), 35%
- 1994 General Election for U.S. Senate (TN)
  - Bill Frist (R), 56%
  - Jim Sasser (D) (inc.), 42%

== Notes ==
Party political offices
Preceded by Albert Gore Sr.	Democratic nominee for U.S. Senator from Tennessee (Class 1); 1976, 1982, 1988, 1994	Succeeded by Jeff Clark
Vacant Title last held by Ted Stevens; John Rhodes	Response to the State of the Union address 1982; Served alongside: Robert Byrd, Alan Cranston, Al Gore, Gary Hart, Bennett Johnston, Ted Kennedy, Tip O'Neill, Don Riegle, Paul Sarbanes	Succeeded by Les AuCoin, Joe Biden, Bill Bradley, Robert Byrd, Tom Daschle, Bill Hefner, Barbara B. Kennelly, George Miller, Tip O'Neill, Paul Tsongas, Tim Wirth
U.S. Senate
Preceded by Bill Brock	United States Senator (Class 1) from Tennessee; 1977–1995; Served alongside: Howard Baker, Al Gore, Harlan Mathews, Fred Thompson	Succeeded by Bill Frist
Preceded by Lawton Chiles	Chair of the Senate Budget Committee; 1989–1995	Succeeded by Pete Domenici
Diplomatic posts
Preceded by J. Stapleton Roy	United States Ambassador to China; 1996–1999	Succeeded by Joseph Prueher
