= 1994 United States Senate election in Tennessee =

- November 8, 1994
- Turnout: 56.62%
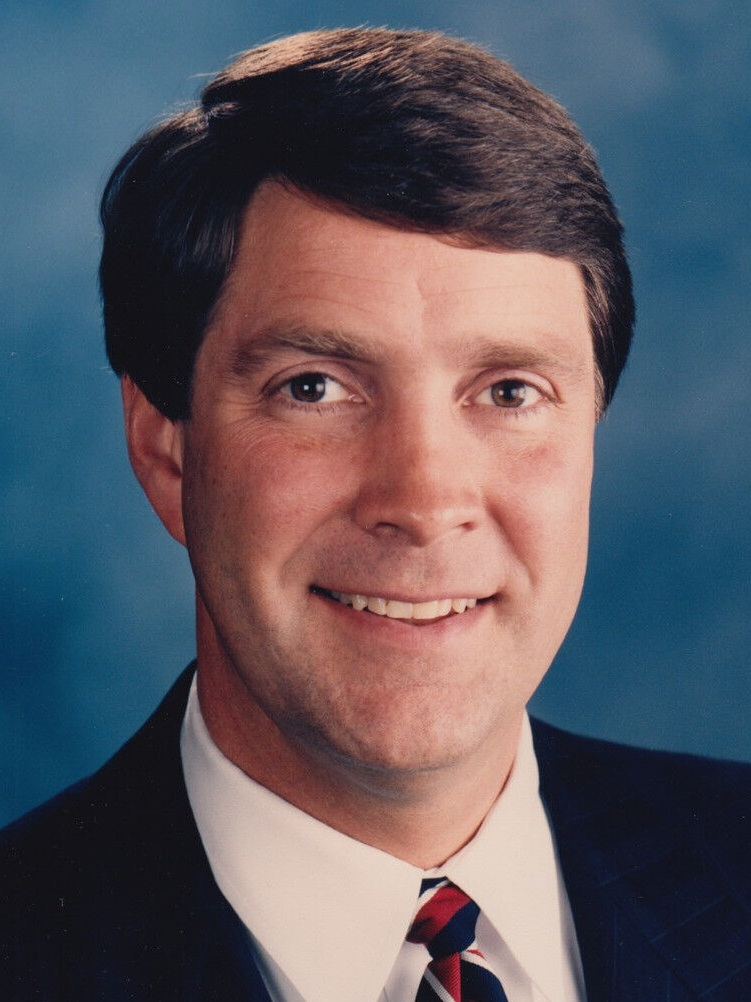

Nominee	Bill Frist	Jim Sasser
Party	Republican	Democratic
Popular vote	834,226	623,164
Percentage	56.35%	42.10%
- County results Frist: 40–50% 50–60% 60–70% 70–80% Sasser: 40–50% 50–60% 60–70%
U.S. senator before election
Jim Sasser
Democratic
Elected U.S. Senator
Bill Frist
Republican

The 1994 United States Senate election in Tennessee was held November 8, 1994. Incumbent Democratic U.S. Senator Jim Sasser ran for re-election to a fourth term but was defeated by Republican nominee Bill Frist. This is the last time that a Senator from Tennessee lost re-election.

The election was held concurrently with the special election for the open Tennessee U.S. Senate seat, which had been held by Democrat Al Gore until his election as Vice President of the United States, and which was sought by Republican nominee Fred Thompson and Democratic nominee Jim Cooper; Thompson won in a decisive victory. As a result of Frist and Thompson's simultaneous victories in Tennessee, the two elections marked the first time since 1978 and the last time until 2021 that both Senate seats in a state have flipped from one party to the other in a single election cycle.

== Major candidates ==
=== Democratic ===
- Jim Sasser, incumbent U.S. Senator

=== Republican ===
- Bill Frist, heart transplant surgeon from Nashville
- Bob Corker, Businessman from Chattanooga and future Senator for this same seat (2006)
- Steve Wilson
- Harold Sterling, Assessor from Shelby County, Tennessee
- Byron Bush, dentist
- Andrew Benedict

Republican Party primary results
Party	Candidate	Votes	%
Republican	Bill Frist	197,734	44.37%
Republican	Bob Corker	143,808	32.27%
Republican	Steve Wilson	50,274	11.28%
Republican	Harold Sterling	28,425	6.38%
Republican	Byron Bush	14,267	3.20%
Republican	Andrew Benedict	11,117	2.50%

== Campaign ==
Heading into the election, Sasser was a three term incumbent, who had previously won his last two elections with over 60% of the vote. He was also chair of the powerful Senate Budget Committee, and with the incoming retirement of Senate Majority Leader George Mitchell of Maine, Sasser was seen as the most likely candidate to succeed him, were he to have won a fourth term

However, there were two unforeseen events that affected the campaign. One was the large scale of discontent that the American people seemed to have toward the first two years of the Clinton administration, especially the proposal for a national healthcare system largely put together and advocated by Clinton's wife, Hillary Clinton. The other was the somewhat unexpected nomination of Nashville heart transplant surgeon Bill Frist for the seat by the Republicans.

Frist, who had never voted until he was 36, was a political unknown and a total novice at campaigning, but was from one of Nashville's most prominent and wealthiest medical families, which gave him some name recognition, as well as adequate enough resources to match the campaign war chest built up by the three-term incumbent, a challenge most "insurgent" candidates find to be impossible. A further factor working to Frist's advantage was a simultaneous Republican campaign by actor and attorney Fred Thompson for the other Tennessee Senate seat, which was open due to Al Gore resigning to become Vice President of the United States.

Another factor in Frist's favor was that Sasser was never seen as possessing much charisma of his own. During the campaign Nashville radio stations were derisive towards Sasser to the point of stating that he could only win "a Kermit The Frog lookalike contest."

In one of the largest upsets in a night of political upsets in the November 1994 U.S. general elections, Frist defeated the incumbent Sasser by 211,062 votes.

== Results ==
General election results
Party	Candidate	Votes	%
Republican	Bill Frist	834,226	56.35
Democratic	Jim Sasser (incumbent)	623,164	42.10
Independent	John Jay Hooker	13,244	0.90
Independent	Charles F. Johnson	6,631	0.45
Independent	Philip Kienlen	3,087	0.21
	Write-In Candidates	39	0.00
Majority		211,062	14.26
Turnout		1,480,391	100.00%
Republican gain from Democratic			

== See also ==
- 1994 United States Senate special election in Tennessee
- 1994 United States Senate elections
- 1994 Tennessee gubernatorial election
