= 1994 United States Senate special election in Tennessee =

- November 8, 1994
- Turnout: 56.62%
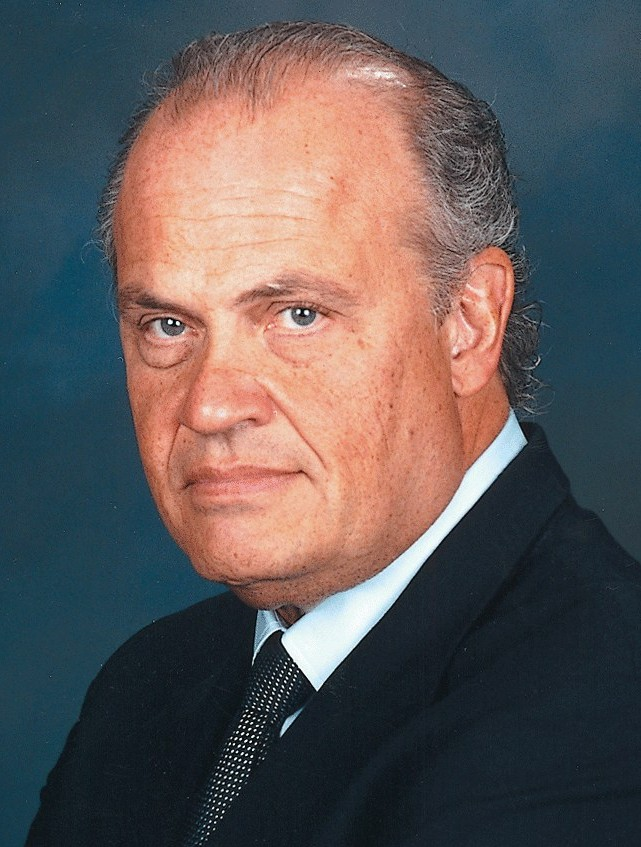

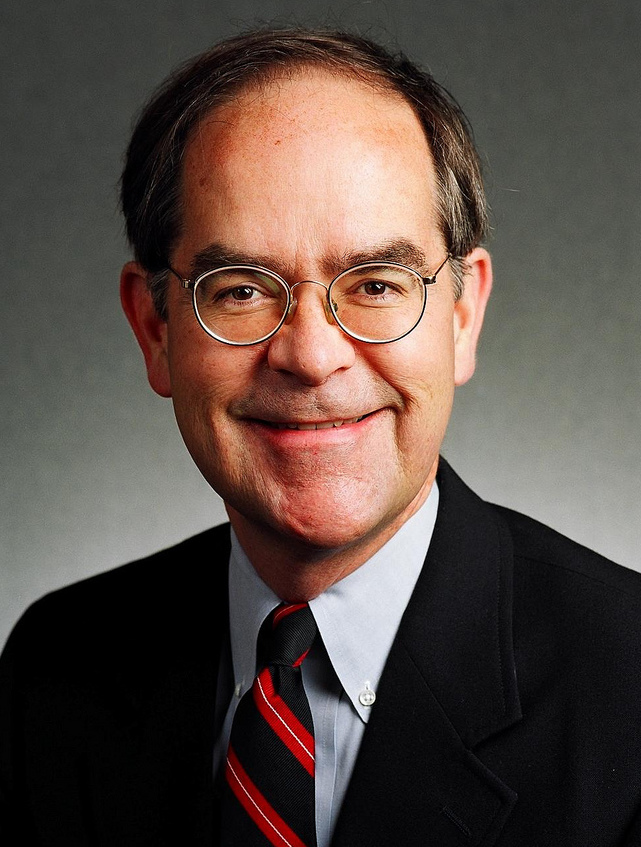
Nominee	Fred Thompson	Jim Cooper
Party	Republican	Democratic
Popular vote	885,998	565,930
Percentage	60.44%	38.61%
- County results Thompson: 40–50% 50–60% 60–70% 70–80% Cooper: 50–60% 60–70%
U.S. senator before election
Harlan Mathews
Democratic
Elected U.S. Senator
Fred Thompson
Republican

The 1994 United States Senate special election in Tennessee was held November 8, 1994. Incumbent Democratic Senator Al Gore resigned from the Senate following his election as Vice President of the United States in 1992, and this led to the 1993 appointment of Harlan Mathews and the subsequent special election. Mathews did not seek election to finish the unexpired term, and Representative Jim Cooper subsequently became the Democratic nominee. However, the Republican nominee Fred Thompson won the seat in a decisive victory.

The election was held concurrently with the regular Class 1 Tennessee Senate election, in which Republican Bill Frist defeated incumbent Democrat Jim Sasser. As a result of Thompson and Frist's simultaneous victories in Tennessee, the two elections marked the first time since 1978 that both Senate seats in a state have flipped from one party to the other in a single election cycle. The next time this was repeated was in Georgia in 2021 where both the regular election and the special election went from incumbent Republicans to Democrats.

== Democratic primary ==
U.S. Representative Jim Cooper, a moderate Democrat from Tennessee's 4th congressional district, won the Democratic nomination for the special election unopposed on August 4, 1994.

=== Nominee ===
- Jim Cooper, U.S. Representative

== Republican primary ==
Fred Thompson, a Nashville attorney and actor who gained national recognition as minority counsel to the Senate Watergate Committee in 1973, announced his candidacy for the Republican nomination in April 1994 to fill the U.S. Senate seat vacated by Al Gore.

Thompson faced only minimal opposition in the August 4, 1994, Republican primary from John Warnp, a Memphis salesman. He won the nomination easily, with little need for extensive campaigning.

=== Nominee ===
- Fred Thompson, attorney and actor

== Election results ==
General election results
Party	Candidate	Votes	%	±%
Republican	Fred Thompson	885,998	60.44%	+30.63%
Democratic	Jim Cooper	565,930	38.61%	−29.12%
Independent	Charles N. Hancock	4,169	0.28%	
Independent	Charles Moore	2,219	0.15%	
Independent	Terry Lytle	1,934	0.13%	
Independent	Kerry Martin	1,719	0.12%	
Independent	Jon Walls	1,532	0.10%	
Independent	Hobart Lumpkin	1,184	0.08%	
Independent	Don Schneller	1,150	0.08%	
Write-ins		27	0.00%	
Majority		320,068	21.83%	−16.08%
Turnout		1,465,862		
Republican gain from Democratic				

== See also ==
- 1994 United States Senate election in Tennessee
- 1994 United States Senate elections
- 1994 Tennessee gubernatorial election
