= Sheffield Rally =

1992 Labour Party political event in the UK

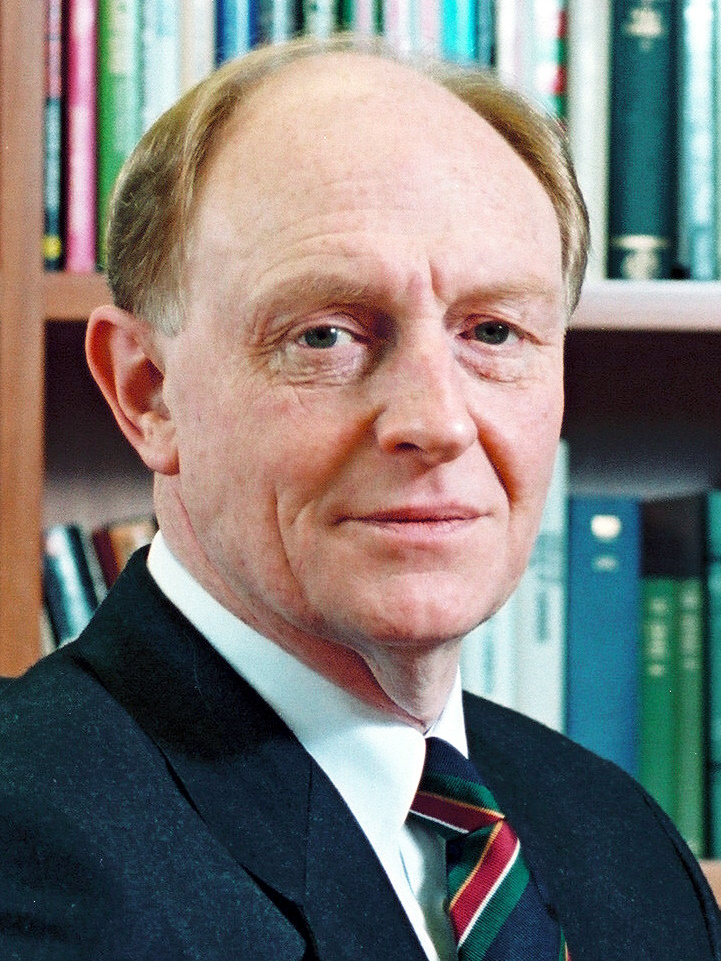
Neil Kinnock, whose performance at the rally was widely panned

The Sheffield Rally was a political event held by the United Kingdom's Labour Party on Wednesday 1 April 1992, a week ahead of the 1992 general election on 9 April.

== The event ==
An event in preparation for eighteen months, the rally was held at the Sheffield Arena, an indoor sports venue in Sheffield, South Yorkshire, England. It was attended by 10,000 Labour Party members, including the entire shadow cabinet, and is reported to have cost some £100,000 to stage. It was the idea of strategist Philip Gould, who was involved in the subsequent successful election campaign of Bill Clinton, who was elected as President of the United States later that year. Neil Kinnock, the leader of the Labour Party, was flown into the city by helicopter.

The rally was modelled partly on American presidential campaign conventions, with sound and light performances on the stage and celebrity endorsements played on a large video screen. At one point in the proceedings, Kinnock and the shadow cabinet paraded to the stage from the back of the venue, passing through an increasingly enthusiastic audience, with the shadow cabinet being introduced with titles such as "The next Home Secretary" (in reference to Roy Hattersley) and "The next Prime Minister" (in reference to Kinnock); Labour had been in opposition for 13 years and had lost the previous three consecutive general elections, in 1979, 1983 and 1987, to the Conservatives.

This culminated in an emotional and animated Kinnock taking the podium and shouting a phrase four times which was generally reported as "We're all right!", although Kinnock would later claim the phrase was "Well all right!" shouted "in the manner of a rock and roll singer." The footage has often been re-broadcast since as an example of overconfident campaigning. Kinnock followed this by proclaiming "We'd better get some talking done here, serious talking."

== Aftermath ==
Although Labour's internal polls at the time suggested the event had little effect on the level of support for the party, media commentators, and some prominent Labour politicians, thought the rally came over as "triumphalist" to television viewers of subsequent news programmes.

The Conservatives won the election eight days later, finishing eight percentage points ahead of Labour in voting, but with a much smaller parliamentary majority than in 1987. It is widely regarded as one of the most surprising election results of the 20th century, as pollsters had predicted a small Labour majority or a hung parliament.

Mirroring Labour's poll results, several analysts and major participants in the campaign believe it actually had little effect. Jim Parish, senior campaigns officer for the Labour Party from 1985 to 1993 and an organiser of the rally, wrote: "The catastrophic 6–7 per cent drop in Labour support occurred before the rally and was – I am reliably informed – known in Sheffield that night." Polls conducted in the final week of the campaign continued to show either the two main parties neck-and-neck or Labour slightly ahead, as they had done prior to the rally.

Some accounts suggest the event only received widespread attention after the election, an opinion Kinnock shared in an April 2010 New Statesman interview: "It wasn't until about ten days after the election that people started writing about the 'hubristic Sheffield rally' and all the rest of it."

In fact, the rally was discussed several times during the BBC's election-night coverage; David Dimbleby questioned Labour's then Shadow Chancellor, John Smith, about the hubristic nature of the rally; BBC commentator David Davies suggested it may have hurt Labour in the Midlands, being seen as "too self-congratulatory, too soon"; and both Conservative David Mellor and Shirley Williams of the Liberal Democrats discussed it in a roundtable conversation.

In a 1995 interview for the BBC Two documentary series The Wilderness Years, Kinnock said: "...all of the years in which I'd attempted to build a fairly reserved, starchy persona – in a few seconds, they slipped away." In the 2010 New Statesman interview, Kinnock expressed a different opinion on the effect of his performance at the rally. He said: "Given my time again, I wouldn't repeat it – but the great legend is complete, bloody rubbish."

In 2021, writing on Kinnock's failure to become Prime Minister, Steve Richards argued that the rally had "acquired a mythological status as fatal event", but noted that prior to Labour's defeat "there was no suggestion that Kinnock had made a terrible blunder". He noted that the BBC's political editor John Cole had indicated he had been impressed in his live reporting of the rally and it was only retrospectively that it started to be portrayed as showing Kinnock as "overconfident and cocky". Richards concluded that blaming the event for Labour's defeat was "a red herring" and the party would have lost the election even if there had been no Sheffield Rally.

The event is often mentioned in relation to other purported political miscalculations or gaffes, such as the Paul Wellstone memorial event during the 2002 United States Senate election in Minnesota. or the Howard Dean "Dean Scream" incident.
