= Rudy Boschwitz =

American politician (born 1930)

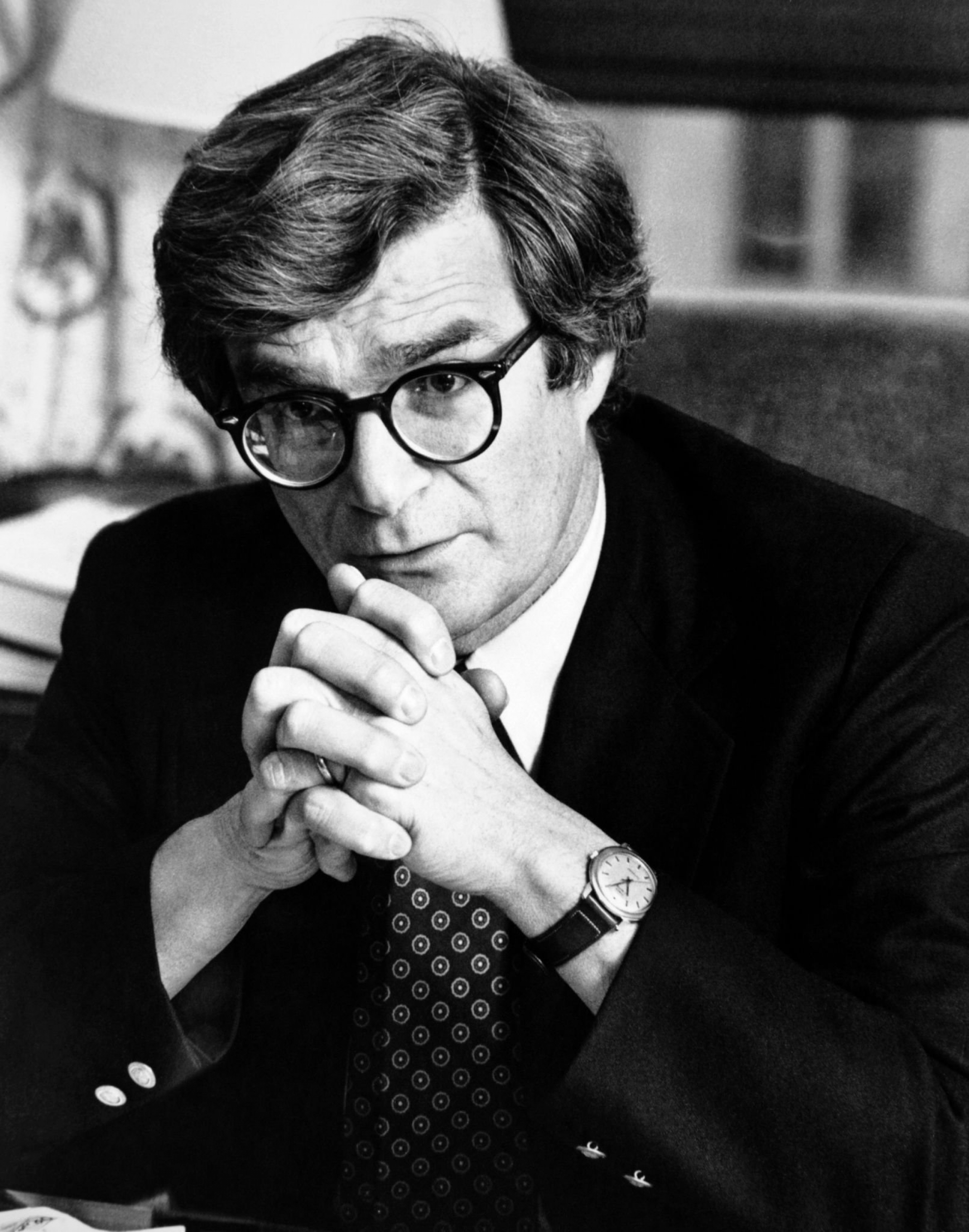
- Official portrait, 1983

United States Ambassador to the United Nations Commission on Human Rights
- In office March 17, 2005 – June 16, 2006
- President: George W. Bush
- Preceded by: Richard S. Williamson
- Succeeded by: Eileen Donahoe (Human Rights Council)

Chair of the National Republican Senatorial Committee
- In office January 3, 1987 – January 3, 1989
- Leader: Bob Dole
- Preceded by: John Heinz
- Succeeded by: Don Nickles

United States Senator from Minnesota
- In office December 30, 1978 – January 3, 1991
- Preceded by: Wendell R. Anderson
- Succeeded by: Paul Wellstone

Personal details
- Born: Rudolph Ely Boschwitz; November 7, 1930 (age 95) Berlin, Germany
- Party: Republican; Independent Republican (1975–1995)
- Spouse: Ellen Loewenstein (m. 1956)
- Children: 4
- Education: Johns Hopkins University (attended); New York University (BS, JD)

Military service
- Allegiance: United States
- Branch: United States Army
- Service years: 1954–1955
- Rank: Private (1st class)
- Unit: Signal Corps

Rudolph Ely Boschwitz (born November 7, 1930) is an American politician and businessman from Minnesota. A member of the Republican Party, he served as a member of the United States Senate from 1978 to 1991. From 1987 to 1989, Boschwitz served as the chairman of the National Republican Senatorial Committee.

Boschwitz was born in Berlin to a Jewish family. When he was two years old, he and his family fled the country due to Adolf Hitler's rise to power. He grew up in New Rochelle, New York, and graduated with a Juris Doctor degree from New York University School of Law in 1953. Boschwitz moved to Minnesota, where he started a retail lumber store chain, Plywood Minnesota (later renamed Home Valu). He grew it into a successful business with 70 stores. Boschwitz became well known for starring in Plywood Minnesota's television commercials, wearing his signature plaid flannel shirts. Home Valu Interiors went out of business in May 2010.

Boschwitz first ran for elected office in Minnesota's 1978 U.S. Senate election and defeated Democratic incumbent Wendell R. Anderson. He was reelected in 1984 by a landslide. From 1987 to 1989, he chaired the National Republican Senatorial Committee. Boschwitz ran for reelection to a third term in the 1990 election against Democrat Paul Wellstone. He significantly outspent Wellstone and was expected to win, but lost in an upset. He was defeated again by Wellstone (who was re-elected) in a rematch in 1996. Boschwitz was later appointed to the United Nations Commission on Human Rights by President of the United States George W. Bush, and served on the commission from 2005 until 2006. As of 2026, Boschwitz is the oldest living former elected U.S. senator since the death of Daniel J. Evans.

== Early life and education ==
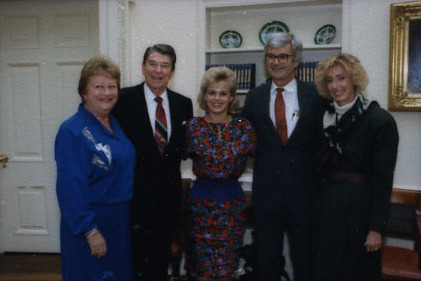
Boschwitz with Ronald Reagan and Gretchen Carlson in 1988

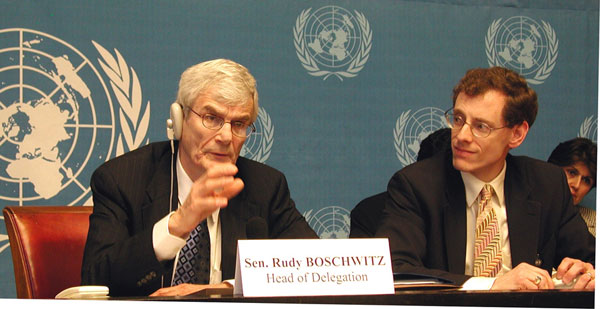
Boschwitz makes a point at the 61st Commission on Human Rights in 2005

Boschwitz was born November 7, 1930, in Berlin, Germany, the son of Lucy (née Dawidowicz) and Eli Boschwitz. In 1933, when he was two years old, his Jewish family fled Nazi Germany for the United States, settling in New Rochelle, New York, where he grew up. A graduate of The Pennington School, he attended Johns Hopkins University and graduated from the New York University Stern School of Business in 1950 and the New York University School of Law in 1953.

== Career ==
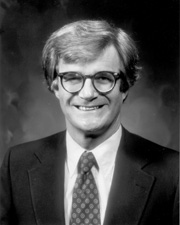
Rudy Boschwitz as U.S. senator

Boschwitz was admitted to the New York State bar in 1954 and the Wisconsin bar in 1959. He served in the United States Army Signal Corps from 1954 to 1955, becoming a private first class. He was the founder and chairman of a plywood and home improvement retailer, Plywood Minnesota, which later became Home Valu Interiors. He returned to the company after his political career, and led it until it went out of business in May 2010.

== United States Senator ==
Boschwitz was elected as a Republican to the United States Senate in November 1978 by 255,717 votes. He appointed on December 30, 1978, to fill the vacancy caused by the resignation of Wendell R. Anderson, who was appointed to fill the seat after Walter Mondale was elected Vice President of the United States in 1976. Boschwitz was well known in Minnesota for operating a "flavored milk" booth at the Minnesota State Fair.

Boschwitz voted in favor of the Passage of Martin Luther King Jr. Day to establish Martin Luther King Jr. Day as a federal holiday and the Civil Rights Restoration Act of 1987 (as well as to override President of the United States Ronald Reagan's veto). He voted to confirm Robert Bork Supreme Court nomination, which failed when Robert Bork was unconfirmed, which was the result of the rejection by the U.S. Senate.

Boschwitz is known for one of the more interesting campaign buttons in Minnesota politics; the Minnesota Democratic–Farmer–Labor Party alleged that Boschwitz's donors were "fat cats", so Boschwitz's campaign created a "skinny cat" campaign button to be worn by those who had donated less than $100 to his campaign.

In 1984, despite Democrat Walter Mondale's narrow victory in the state in the concurrent presidential election, Boschwitz won reelection to a second term, defeating Democratic challenger Joan Growe by 347,082 votes.

Boschwitz ran for a third term in 1990. Despite leading in all polls, he was defeated by Paul Wellstone by 47,624 votes.

== Post Senate Career ==
In 1991 he traveled to Ethiopia as the emissary of President of the United States George H. W. Bush. The negotiations Boschwitz led in Ethiopia resulted in Operation Solomon. Over 14,000 Jewish people were airlifted from Ethiopia to Israel. Operation Solomon took twice as many Beta Israel émigrés to Israel as Operation Moses and Operation Joshua combined.

In 1996 Boschwitz tried to regain his former seat. On the campaign trail he accused Wellstone of supporting flag burning, and called him "embarrassingly liberal" and "Senator Welfare". On November 5, 1996, Boschwitz lost again to Wellstone, this time by 197,236 votes.

Boschwitz was a top "Bush Pioneer" in 2000, raising $388,193, and a "Bush Ranger" in 2004, raising at least $200,000 for former Governor of Texas George W. Bush's campaign fund in that election cycle.

In 2005, Bush named Boschwitz as the United States Ambassador to the United Nations Commission on Human Rights, which met at the U.N. in Geneva.

== Later life ==
Boschwitz supported the John McCain 2008 presidential campaign in the 2008 United States presidential election. He later served on the board of directors of the Jewish Institute for National Security of America, was a board member of the AIPAC (American Israel Public Affairs Committee), and was a member of the Council on Foreign Relations. Upon the death of Daniel J. Evans in September 2024, Boschwitz became the oldest living person to have served as an elected member of the U.S. Senate.

== Personal life ==
Boschwitz married his wife, the former Ellen Antoinette Loewenstein, in 1956, and they had four sons, Gerry (died December 30, 2018), Kenneth, Daniel, and Thomas. Together, they also had three granddaughters and four grandsons.

== Electoral history ==
1978 U.S. Senate election in Minnesota
Primary election
| Party | Candidate | Votes | % |
|---|---|---|---|
| Ind.-Republican | Rudy Boschwitz | 185,393 | 86.81 |
| Ind.-Republican | Harold Stassen | 28,170 | 13.19 |
| Total votes | | 213,563 | 100.00 |
General election
| Ind.-Republican | Rudy Boschwitz | 894,092 | 56.57 |
| Democratic (DFL) | Wendell Anderson (incumbent) | 638,375 | 40.39 |
| American | Sal Carlone | 23,261 | 1.47 |
| Socialist Workers | William Peterson | 9,856 | 0.62 |
| Independent | Brian J. Coyle | 8,083 | 0.51 |
| Workers League | Jean T. Brust | 3,891 | 0.25 |
| Libertarian | Leonard J. Richards | 2,992 | 0.19 |
| Others | Write-ins | 72 | 0.01 |
| Total votes | | 1,580,622 | 100.00 |
| Ind.-Republican gain from Democratic (DFL) | | | |

1984 U.S. Senate election in Minnesota
Primary election
| Party | Candidate | Votes | % |
|---|---|---|---|
| Ind.-Republican | Rudy Boschwitz (incumbent) | 162,555 | 96.59 |
| Ind.-Republican | John Barcelona | 3,277 | 1.95 |
| Ind.-Republican | Carlan Lesch | 2,462 | 1.46 |
| Total votes | | 168,294 | 100.00 |
General election
| Ind.-Republican | Rudy Boschwitz (incumbent) | 1,199,926 | 58.08 |
| Democratic | Joan Growe | 852,844 | 41.28 |
| Socialist Workers | Eleanor Garcia | 5,351 | 0.26 |
| New Union Party | Jeffrey M. Miller | 4,653 | 0.23 |
| Libertarian | Richard Putman | 3,129 | 0.15 |
| Total votes | | 2,065,903 | 100.00 |
| Ind.-Republican hold | | | |

1990 U.S. Senate election in Minnesota
| Party | Candidate | Votes | % |
|---|---|---|---|
| Democratic (DFL) | Paul Wellstone | 911,999 | 50.49 |
| Ind.-Republican | Rudy Boschwitz (incumbent) | 864,375 | 47.86 |
| Grassroots | Russell Bentley | 29,820 | 1.65 |
| Total votes | | 1,806,194 | 100.00 |
| Democratic (DFL) gain from Ind.-Republican | | | |

1996 U.S. Senate election in Minnesota
| Party | Candidate | Votes | % |
|---|---|---|---|
| Democratic (DFL) | Paul Wellstone (incumbent) | 1,098,430 | 50.32 |
| Republican | Rudy Boschwitz | 901,194 | 41.28 |
| Reform | Dean Barkley | 152,328 | 6.98 |
| Total votes | | 2,151,952 | 9.04 |
| Democratic (DFL) hold | | | |

== See also ==
- List of Jewish members of the United States Congress
- List of United States senators born outside the United States

Party political offices
| Preceded by Phil Hansen | Republican nominee for U.S. Senator from Minnesota (Class 2); 1978, 1984, 1990, 1996 | Succeeded by Norm Coleman |
| Preceded by John Heinz | Chair of the National Republican Senatorial Committee; 1987–1989 | Succeeded by Don Nickles |
U.S. Senate
| Preceded by Wendell Anderson | U.S. Senator (Class 2) from Minnesota; 1978–1991; Served alongside: David Durenberger | Succeeded by Paul Wellstone |
| Preceded by Lowell Weicker | Ranking Member of the Senate Small Business Committee; 1989–1991 | Succeeded by Bob Kasten |
Diplomatic posts
| Preceded by Richard S. Williamson | United States Ambassador to the United Nations Commission on Human Rights; 2005–2006 | Succeeded by Eileen Donahoe as United States Ambassador to the United Nations Human Rights Council |
U.S. order of precedence (ceremonial)
| Preceded by Bob Kasten as Former U.S. Senator | Order of precedence of the United States as Former U.S. Senator | Succeeded by Gordon H. Smith as Former U.S. Senator |
