= 1990 United States Senate election in Minnesota =

- November 6, 1990
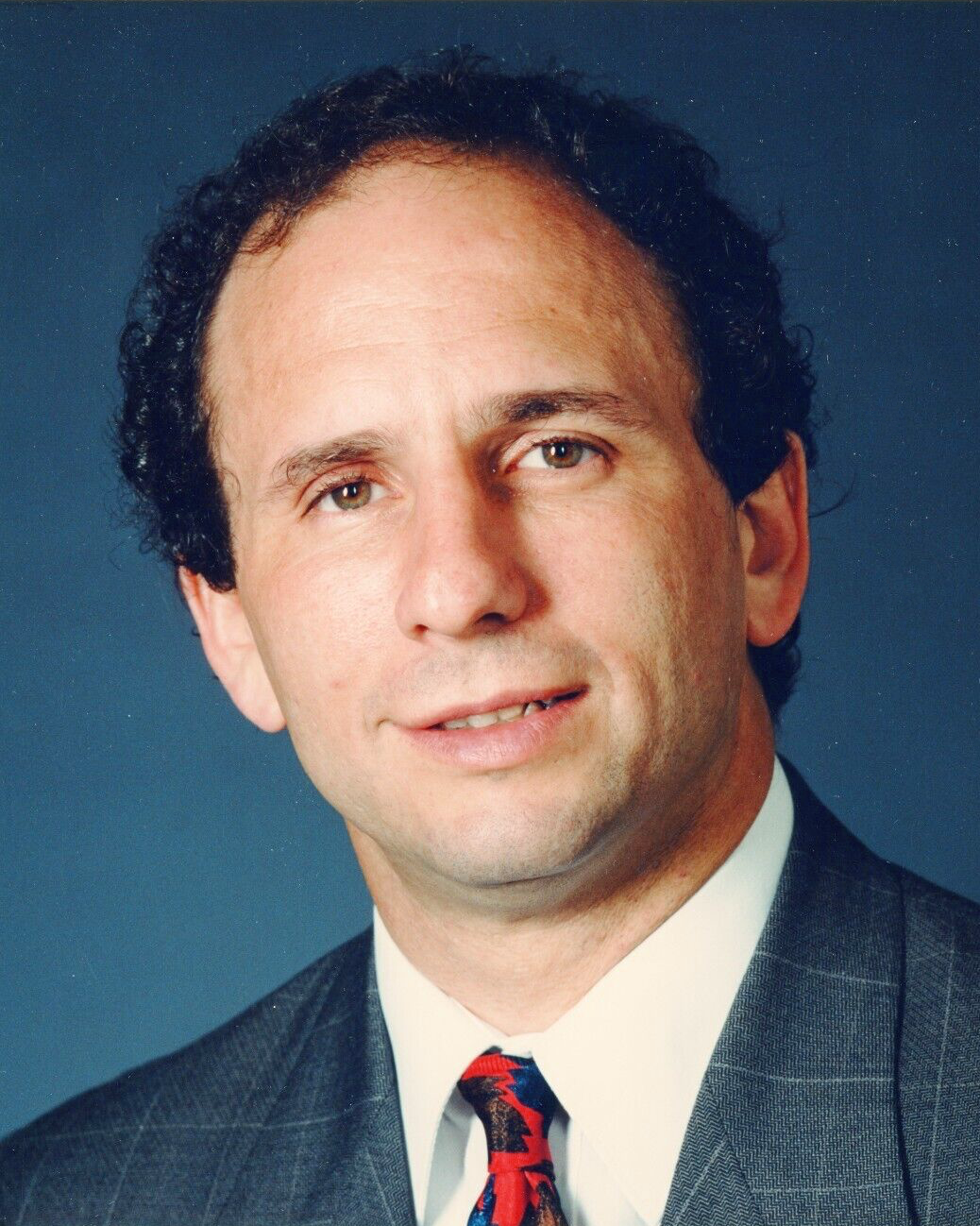

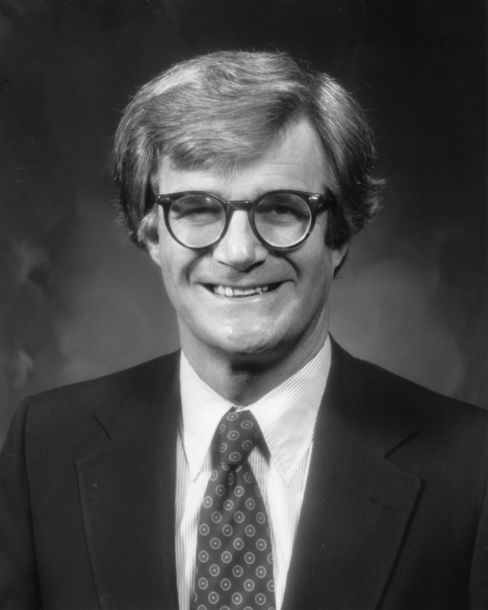
Nominee	Paul Wellstone	Rudy Boschwitz
Party	Democratic (DFL)	Ind.-Republican
Popular vote	911,999	864,375
Percentage	50.49%	47.86%
- County results Wellstone: 40–50% 50–60% 60–70% Boschwitz: 40–50% 50–60% 60–70%
U.S. senator before election
Rudy Boschwitz
Ind.-Republican
Elected U.S. Senator
Paul Wellstone
Democratic (DFL)

The 1990 United States Senate election in Minnesota was held on November 6, 1990. Incumbent Republican U.S. Senator Rudy Boschwitz was defeated by Democratic challenger Paul Wellstone in a tight race. Widely considered an underdog and outspent by a 7-to-1 margin, Wellstone was the only candidate to both defeat an incumbent senator and flip a seat in the 1990 election cycle; he gained national attention after his upset victory. The race was also notable as the first in the history of the U.S. Senate where both major-party candidates were Jewish. Wellstone was re-elected in 1996 in a rematch with Boschwitz.

== Background ==
In 1984, despite Democrat Walter Mondale's narrow victory in the state in the concurrent presidential election, Rudy Boschwitz won reelection to a second term, defeating Democratic challenger Joan Growe 58% to 41%.

The election was held as part of the midterm election cycle of Republican president George H. W. Bush's term.

== General election ==
=== Candidates ===
- Russell Bentley, lumberjack and marijuana legalization activist (Grassroots)
- Rudy Boschwitz, incumbent U.S. Senator since 1979 (Independent-Republican)
- Paul Wellstone, professor at Carleton College and nominee for Minnesota State Auditor in 1982 (DFL)

=== Campaign ===
Paul Wellstone was considered to be a longshot candidate, being outspent by a margin of 7-to-1. Wellstone used grassroots campaigning tactics, and quirky campaign ads like "Fast Paul", where he spoke quickly about himself and his platform, and "Looking for Rudy", a two minute ad where he went searching for his opponent Rudy Boschwitz throughout Minnesota.

=== Debates ===
1990 United States Senate election in Minnesota debates
No.	Date	Host	Moderator	Link	Republican	Democratic
Key: P Participant A Absent N Not invited I Invited W Withdrawn						
Key: P Participant A Absent N Not invited I Invited W Withdrawn					Rudy Boschwitz	Paul Wellstone
1	October 14, 1990	KMSP-TV; League of Women Voters	Beverly McKinnell	C-SPAN	P	P
2	October 18, 1990		Bob Potter	C-SPAN	P	P

=== Results ===
General election results
Party	Candidate	Votes	%
Democratic (DFL)	Paul Wellstone	911,999	50.49%
Ind.-Republican	Rudy Boschwitz (incumbent)	864,375	47.86%
Grassroots	Russell B. Bentley	29,820	1.65%
Total votes		1,806,194	100.00%
Democratic (DFL) gain from Ind.-Republican			

== See also ==
- 1990 United States Senate elections
