= 1984 United States Senate election in Minnesota =

- November 6, 1984
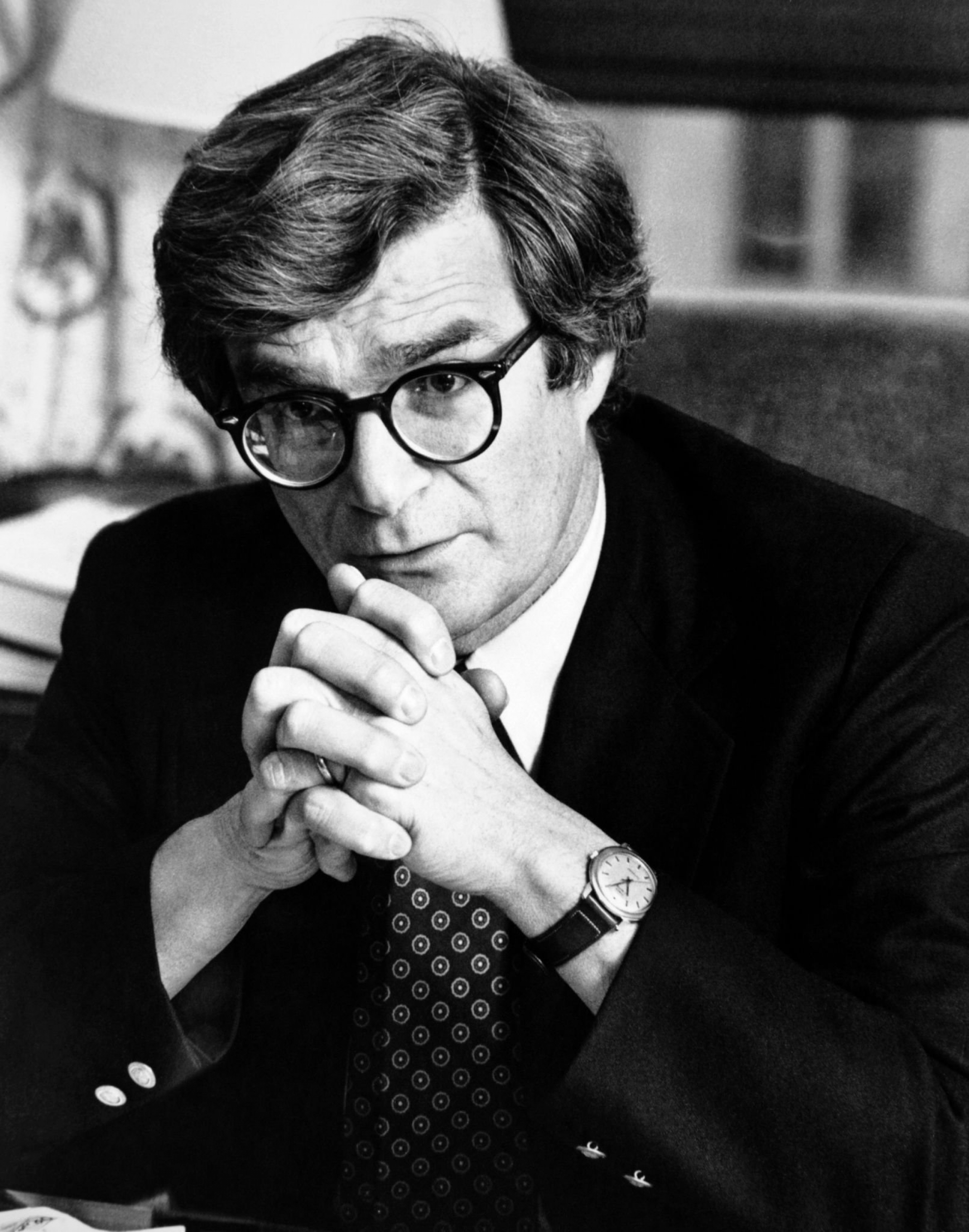

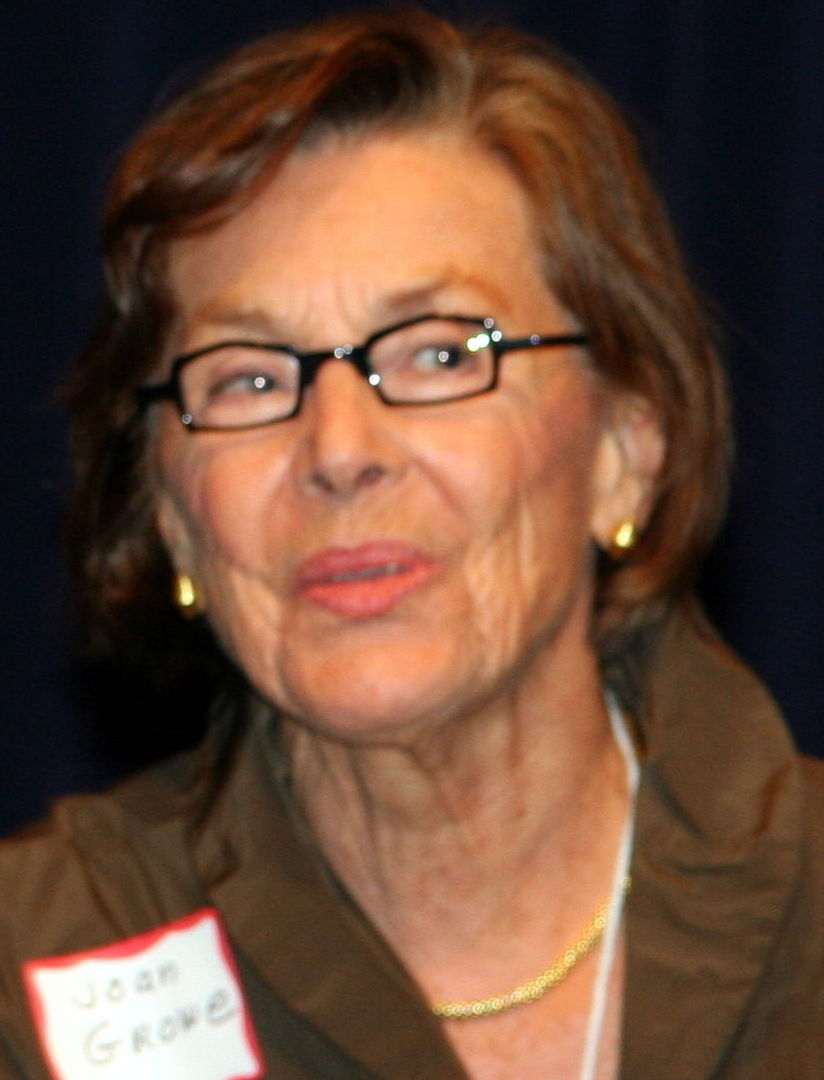
Nominee	Rudy Boschwitz	Joan Growe
Party	Ind.-Republican	Democratic (DFL)
Popular vote	1,199,926	852,844
Percentage	58.08%	41.28%
- County results Boschwitz: 50–60% 60–70% 70–80% Growe: 40–50% 50–60%
U.S. senator before election
Rudy Boschwitz
Republican
Elected U.S. Senator
Rudy Boschwitz
Republican

The 1984 United States Senate election in Minnesota was held on November 6, 1984. Incumbent Republican U.S. Senator Rudy Boschwitz defeated Democratic nominee Joan Growe.

Boschwitz's victory coincided with President Ronald Reagan's nationwide landslide in the concurrent presidential election in which he defeated Walter Mondale, a Minnesota native (Mondale narrowly won the state). This election was the only time since 1930 in which the incumbent Republican senator was reelected to this seat.

== Republican primary ==
=== Candidates ===
- John Barcelona
- Rudy Boschwitz, incumbent senator since 1978 (Republican)
- Carlan Lesch

=== Results ===
1984 Republican U.S. Senate primary
Party	Candidate	Votes	%
Ind.-Republican	Rudy Boschwitz (incumbent)	162,555	96.59%
Ind.-Republican	John Barcelona	3,277	1.95%
Ind.-Republican	Carlan Lesch	2,462	1.46%
Total votes		168,294	100.00%

== Democratic primary ==
=== Candidates ===
- Donald Black
- Sal Carlone, American Party nominee for U.S. Senate in 1978
- Joan Growe, Secretary of State of Minnesota
- Harris H. Herman
- Kent S. Herschbach, Mendota Heights truck driver, Lyndon LaRouche supporter, and perennial candidate
- Clarence J. Lagermaier
- Robert W. Mattson Jr., Minnesota State Treasurer
- Ole Savior, perennial candidate
- William Touhy Heine

=== Results ===
1984 Democratic U.S. Senate primary
Party	Candidate	Votes	%
Democratic (DFL)	Joan Growe	238,190	75.87%
Democratic (DFL)	Robert W. Mattson Jr.	61,489	19.59%
Democratic (DFL)	Kent S. Herschbach	2,591	0.83%
Democratic (DFL)	Donald Black	2,376	0.76%
Democratic (DFL)	Clarence J. Lagermaier	2,098	0.67%
Democratic (DFL)	William Touhy Heine	2,059	0.67%
Democratic (DFL)	Sal Carlone	2,032	0.65%
Democratic (DFL)	Harris H. Herman	1,660	0.53%
Democratic (DFL)	Ole Savior	1,435	0.46%
Total votes		313,930	100.00%

== General election ==
=== Candidates ===
- Rudy Boschwitz, incumbent senator since 1978 (Republican)
- Eleanor Garcia (Socialist Workers)
- Joan Growe, Secretary of State of Minnesota (Democratic)
- Jeffrey M. Miller (New Union)
- Richard Putman (Libertarian)

=== Results ===
General election results
Party	Candidate	Votes	%
Ind.-Republican	Rudy Boschwitz (incumbent)	1,199,926	58.08%
Democratic	Joan Growe	852,844	41.28%
Socialist Workers	Eleanor Garcia	5,351	0.26%
New Union Party	Jeffrey M. Miller	4,653	0.23%
Libertarian	Richard Putman	3,129	0.15%
Total votes		2,065,903	100.00%
Ind.-Republican hold			

== See also ==
- 1984 United States Senate elections
