= Philip Gould (disambiguation) =

Philip Gould, Baron Gould of Brookwood (1950–2011) was a British political consultant and former advertising executive

Philip or Phil Gould may also refer to:

- Phil Gould (rugby league) (born 1958), Australian rugby league broadcaster, journalist, administrator and former player and coach
- Phil Gould (musician) (born 1957), British drummer, songwriter and singer
