= Gail Rebuck =

British publisher (born 1952)

The Right Honourable The Baroness Rebuck DBE
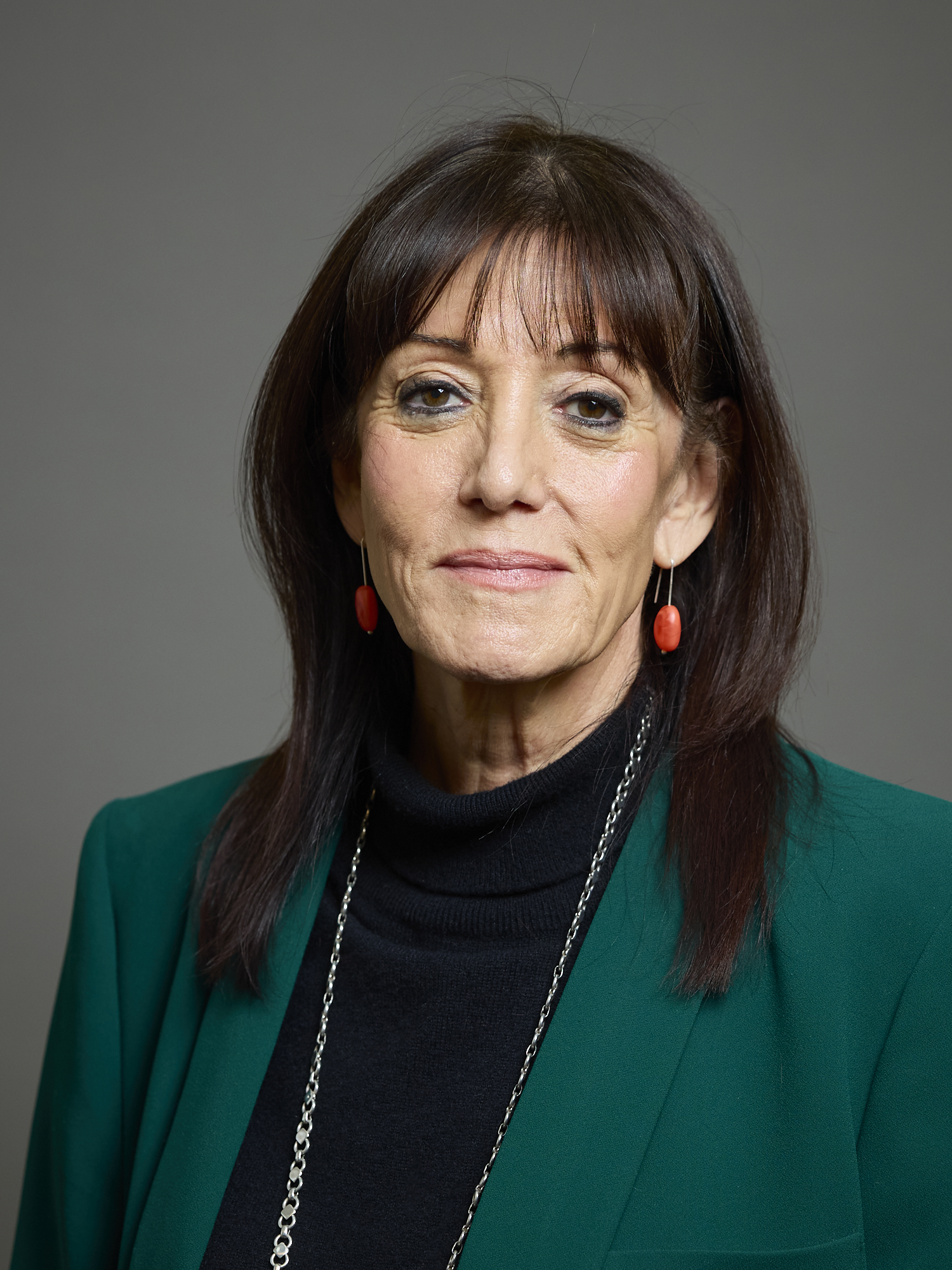
- Official portrait, 2025

Member of the House of Lords
- Lord Temporal
- Life peerage 18 September 2014

Personal details
- Born: Gail Ruth Rebuck; 10 February 1952 (age 74)
- Party: Labour
- Spouse: Philip Gould (m. 1985; died 2011)
- Children: 2, including Georgia Gould
- Education: Lycée Français Charles de Gaulle
- Alma mater: University of Sussex (BA)
- Occupation: Publisher

Gail Ruth Rebuck, Baroness Rebuck DBE (born 10 February 1952) is a British publisher and chair of Penguin Random House UK. She has served as a Labour member of the House of Lords since 2014.

== Early life and education ==
Rebuck's Latvian-born Jewish grandfather, and her own father, were both in the London rag trade. Her mother was a Dutch Jew.

At the age of four she was sent to the Lycée Français Charles de Gaulle, London, where she learned to read and write in French before she did in English. She graduated with a degree in intellectual history from Sussex University in 1974.

== Career ==
Rebuck worked for several independent publishers and ran a paperback imprint for Hamlyn, before putting her own funds into a new imprint, Century. After a merger with Hutchinson in 1985, Century Hutchinson was taken over by Random House UK in 1989. Rebuck was appointed chair and chief executive of Random House UK in 1991.

Rebuck was fifth in a 2006 Observer list of the top people in the British books industry, and ninth in a 2011 Guardian version of the list. In February 2013, she was assessed the tenth most powerful woman in the UK by Woman's Hour on BBC Radio 4. She was recognised as one of the BBC's 100 women of 2013.

In February 2015, Rebuck succeeded Sir Neil Cossons as pro-provost and chair of council (the governing body) at the Royal College of Art (RCA), having joined the RCA council in 1999.

== Personal life ==
She was married to Philip Gould, until his death in November 2011. They had two daughters: Georgia Gould, who serves as the MP for Queen's Park and Maida Vale, and Grace Gould.

== Honours ==
Rebuck was appointed a Commander of the Order of the British Empire (CBE) in the 2000 New Year Honours, and promoted to Dame Commander of the same Order (DBE) in the 2009 Birthday Honours.

In 2014, it was announced that Rebuck was to become a Labour peer in the House of Lords, following in the footsteps of her late husband. She was created a life peer on 18 September 2014, taking the title Baroness Rebuck, of Bloomsbury in the London Borough of Camden.

Orders of precedence in the United Kingdom
Preceded by The Baroness Helic	Ladies; Baroness Rebuck	Followed by The Baroness Mobarik
