= Paul Wellstone memorial event =

October 2002 event in Williams Arena, Minneapolis

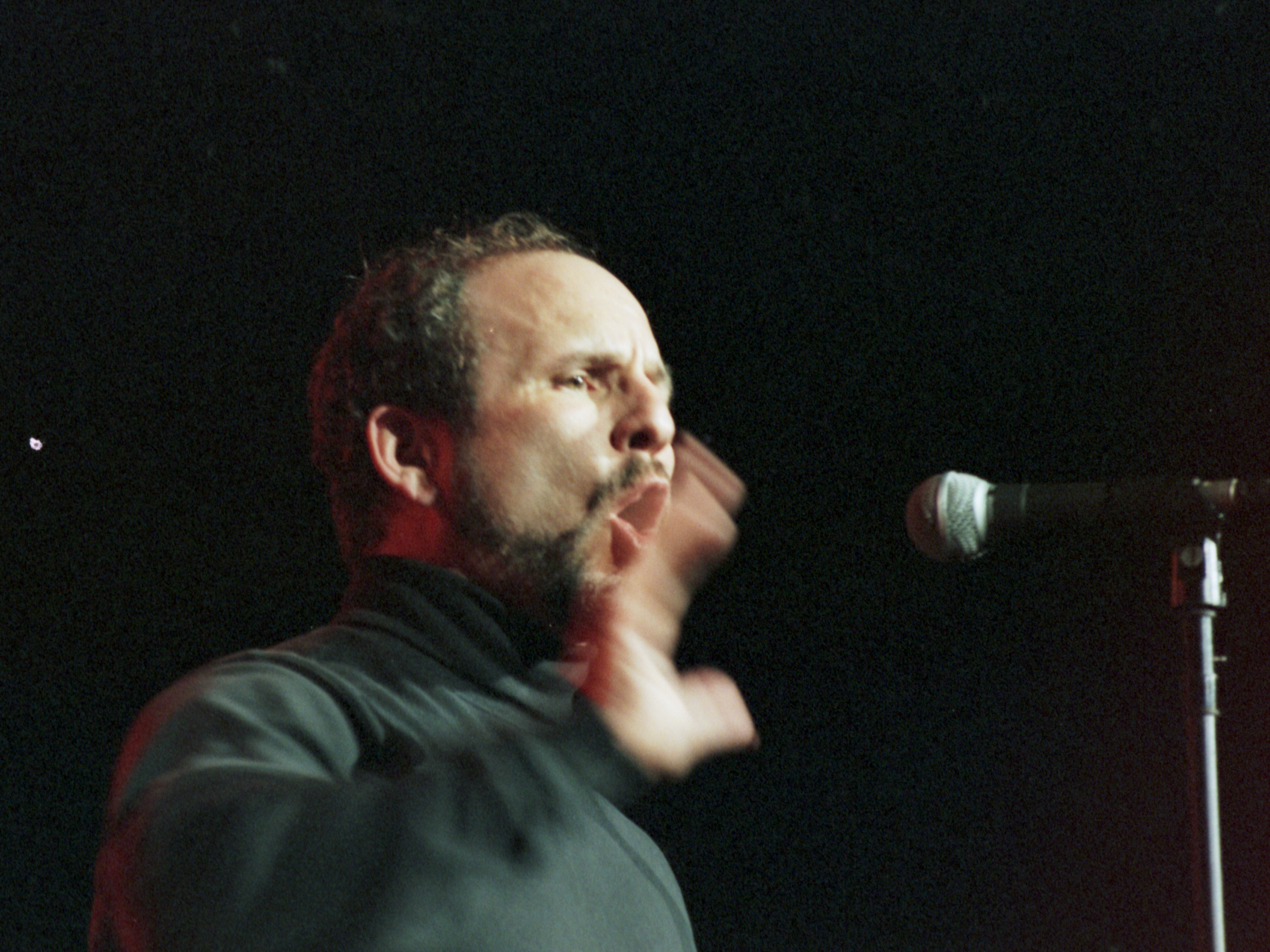
Sen. Paul Wellstone in 1999

On October 29, 2002, four days after the death of Minnesota U.S. Senator Paul Wellstone in a small plane crash and one week before the election in which he was running for a third term, a large public memorial event was held in Williams Arena in Minneapolis in remembrance of the senator and seven others killed in the crash.

In the week that followed, the tone and content of the memorial became a major public focus, with claims by public figures including Minnesota Governor Jesse Ventura that the event had devolved from a memorial into a partisan political rally. A poll completed hours before the memorial reflected an eight-point lead for Wellstone's planned replacement on the ballot, former Vice-President Walter Mondale, over Republican challenger and former St. Paul Mayor Norm Coleman. A significant backlash ensued against the Minnesota Democratic–Farmer–Labor Party (DFL) generally and Mondale's candidacy specifically.

A sizable shift in public opinion occurred in the week following the memorial event, with Mondale's commanding lead shrinking to a fraction of a point on Election Day before Coleman won by 2.2%. A significant portion of media analysis and public comment cited the memorial as a major cause of Mondale's loss.

Coleman's election was a decisive factor in shifting the Senate from Democratic to Republican control, giving Republicans a government trifecta —control of the White House and both houses of Congress—for the next four years. The claimed influence of the memorial on the election ranks the event among the most consequential in Minnesota's political history, "altering the state's political landscape," with added repercussions at the national and international level. "When Sen. Paul Wellstone’s plane went down in a northern Minnesota bog," said the Minnesota Star Tribune, "it turned the state into the ground zero of American politics."

== Aftermath of the crash ==
Wellstone's death occurred in the context of a consequential and contentious national election. President George W. Bush and the Republican Party were experiencing an atypically strong midterm election for the party in power, due in part to a rally 'round the flag effect following the September 11 attacks. Just 18 days earlier, Wellstone had voted against the Authorization for Use of Military Force Against Iraq. He died just 11 days before his potential reelection in a crucial race to determine party control of the Senate, which Democrats held by a single seat.

His death was met with a bipartisan outpouring of emotion that went beyond the politics of the moment. Often referred to as "the conscience of the Senate," Wellstone's political brand and approach to campaigning were frequently described in personal and populist terms such as "joyful," "optimistic," and "grassroots". Campaigning was halted by all sides.

Minnesota law required that his name be stricken from the ballot, to be replaced by a candidate chosen by the party. One day after the crash, the DFL selected former Vice President Walter Mondale, The memorial service for Wellstone and the other victims of the crash was held in Williams Arena at the University of Minnesota and broadcast live on national TV.

== Oct. 29, 2002 memorial event ==
In addition to grassroots supporters, entertainers, and other public figures, the memorial event was attended by politicians across the political spectrum. Democrats including former President Bill Clinton and First Lady Hillary Clinton, and former Vice President Al Gore. Current and former Democratic senators Ted Kennedy, Joe Lieberman, Tom Harkin, Tom Daschle, John Glenn, and John Kerry were present, as well as Republican Minority Leader Trent Lott, Representative Jim Ramstad, and Bush Administration Health and Human Services Secretary Tommy Thompson. Minnesota Governor Jesse Ventura of the Independence Party also attended the event. Rather than drawing from high-profile attendees, the invited speakers were mostly limited to close colleagues and friends of Wellstone's.

Although most speakers and elements of the event were not unusual for a memorial and celebration of life, including remarks by friends and colleagues and gospel music by the Sounds of Blackness, press accounts and quotes from those in attendance described a tone that turned to something resembling a "pep rally" or "partisan foot-stomp". Trent Lott and other Republicans were audibly booed as they entered the arena. A line from the opening remarks of event host and former Saint Paul Mayor George Latimer (“In the belief that a free and caring people can overcome war, pestilence, and the loss of common sense”—a likely allusion to the Iraq War resolution recently opposed by Wellstone) drew a 30-second standing ovation and a camera shot of Bill Clinton laughing and applauding on the Jumbotron.

But the speaker most often cited in subsequent commentary as bearing responsibility for a political tone was Wellstone's longtime friend and former campaign treasurer Rick Kahn.

Kahn’s speech began as a conventional eulogy but quickly began to include calls to specific political action by those in attendance, suggesting that the only way to honor Wellstone’s values was to act politically as Wellstone would have acted. “We are going to stand up together,” he said. “And then, we’re gonna organize, we’re gonna organize, we’re gonna organize, we’re gonna organize, we’re gonna organize, we’re gonna organize!...[T]ogether, we can and will continue to fight every one of his fights; and together we can and will achieve great victories in Paul Wellstone’s name.’’

Approximately halfway through the speech, Kahn moved beyond generalities to an explicit solicitation of votes for the Democratic senatorial candidate, interrupted multiple times by ovations:

A week from today, Paul Wellstone’s name will not, and cannot, be on the ballot. But there will be a choice nonetheless either to embrace and continue his legacy in the United States Senate, either to keep his legacy alive or bring it forever to an end [audience responded with a resounding "No!"]. If Paul Wellstone’s legacy in the Senate comes to an end within just days after this unspeakable tragedy, then our spirits will be crushed and we will drown in a river of tears. We are begging you, do not let this happen. We are begging you to help us win this Senate election for Paul Wellstone!

Kahn repeated the call for specific political action several times: “[C]an you not hear your friend calling you one last time to step forward on his behalf to keep his legacy alive and help us win this election for Paul Wellstone?”

== Aftermath of the memorial ==
Despite the political overtones that preceded Kahn's speech in the event, a rhetorical analysis summed up the clear narrative that emerged afterward: "The overwhelming conclusion of politicians, pundits, and journalists was that Kahn’s overt partisan politicking could be blamed for the backlash that ensued."

Condemnation of the event's tone was swift. Governor Jesse Ventura, who had previously stated his intention to appoint a Democrat to serve out the remainder of Wellstone's term through January 2003, said he was "disgusted" by the event, calling it "deceitful" and walking out, then threatening to appoint "an ordinary citizen" instead of a Democrat. On November 4, the day before the election, Ventura appointed state planning commissioner Dean Barkley, founder and chair of Ventura's Independence Party of Minnesota, to serve the remaining two months of Wellstone's term; Barkley had run against Wellstone in 1996.

Prominent Republicans began to call for "equal air time,’’ claiming that the memorial was essentially a three-hour campaign ad for the Democrats. Former Republican congressional representative from Minnesota Vin Weber said, ‘‘The DFL clearly intends to exploit Wellstone’s memory totally, completely and shamelessly for political gain. To them, Wellstone’s death, apparently, was just another campaign event.’’

Wellstone campaign manager Jeff Blodgett noted after the event that it had not been scripted and apologized to people who were offended or surprised.

Despite an eight-point deficit in the days before the election, Norm Coleman defeated Walter Mondale by 2.2%. Because Democrats had controlled the Senate by a single vote, their advantage disappeared, with the tie-breaking vote of Vice President Dick Cheney giving Republicans de facto control. Other Senate results across the country increased the Republican caucus to an actual Senate majority of 51 seats.

University of Minnesota political science professor Lawrence R. Jacobs noted that the resulting government trifecta—control of the presidency, the Senate, and the House—could break ‘‘the deadlock that kept a number of bills from passing" in the prior session.

Minnesota's Senate race led a strong night for the GOP as Republican Tim Pawlenty won a three-way governor’s race, the party picked up a U.S. House seat, and gains were made in the state legislature.

== "The Wellstone effect" ==
The Wellstone memorial event has become a cautionary touchstone in American politics warning against the backlash that may occur if a moment of public grief is politicized, often under the name "the Wellstone effect."

A prominent example is found after U.S. Senator Ted Kennedy died on August 25, 2009 in the midst of heated debate over the Affordable Care Act. Conservative commentators at the time invoked the Wellstone memorial to fend off any Democratic efforts to use Kennedy’s name to promote the legislation. "Remember Paul Wellstone’s death?" said commentator Sean Hannity. "You know, ‘Let’s do everything for Paul’. And we’re now being implored to get behind Obamacare because it’s what Ted Kennedy would have wanted."

Commentator Rush Limbaugh warned that Ted Kennedy's memorial service would be a ‘‘Wellstone memorial on steroids." And NBC News noted that, ‘‘Anyone addressing the health care bill at the [Kennedy] service will tread a fine line between taste and politics...The dangers of politicizing a memorial event were illustrated by a 2002 memorial for Sen. Paul Wellstone."

"The Wellstone effect" has also been used more positively to describe a subsequent generation of politicians and activists who claim to have been inspired to public service by Wellstone, often despite long odds.
