= Wendell R. Anderson =

American hockey player and politician (1933–2016)

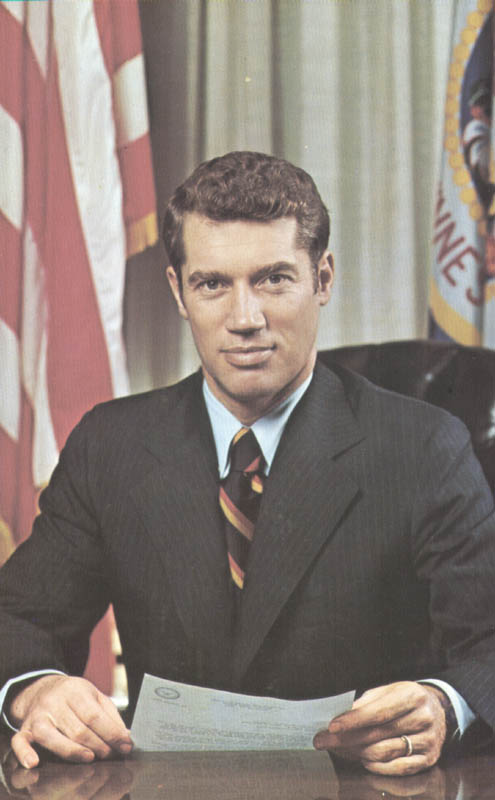
- Anderson c. 1971-1976

United States Senator from Minnesota
- In office December 30, 1976 – December 29, 1978
- Appointed by: Rudy Perpich
- Preceded by: Walter Mondale
- Succeeded by: Rudy Boschwitz

33rd Governor of Minnesota
- In office January 4, 1971 – December 29, 1976
- Lieutenant: Rudy Perpich
- Preceded by: Harold LeVander
- Succeeded by: Rudy Perpich

Member of the Minnesota Senate
- In office January 8, 1963 – January 4, 1971
- Preceded by: Bill Dosland
- Succeeded by: John C. Chenoweth
- Constituency: 49th district (1963–67); 44th district (1967–71)

Member of the Minnesota House of Representatives from the 37th district
- In office January 6, 1959 – January 8, 1963
- Preceded by: S. L. Beanblossom
- Succeeded by: George A. French

Personal details
- Born: Wendell Richard Anderson; February 1, 1933 Saint Paul, Minnesota, U.S.
- Died: July 17, 2016 (aged 83) Saint Paul, Minnesota, U.S.
- Resting place: Lakewood Cemetery
- Party: Democratic
- Spouse: Mary Christine McKee (m. 1963; div. 1990)
- Children: 3
- Education: University of Minnesota, Twin Cities (BA, LLB)

Military service
- Allegiance: United States
- Branch/service: United States Army
- Years of service: 1955–1957 (active); 1957–c. 1963 (reserve)
- Rank: First Lieutenant

Wendell Richard "Wendy" Anderson (February 1, 1933 – July 17, 2016) was an American politician and hockey player who served from 1971 to 1976 as the 33rd governor of Minnesota. In late 1976, he resigned as governor in order to be appointed to the U.S. Senate, after Senator Walter Mondale was elected Vice President of the United States. Anderson served in the Senate for almost two years, but after losing the 1978 Senate election to Rudy Boschwitz, he resigned a few days before the end of his term to give Boschwitz seniority.

== Background ==
Anderson was born in Saint Paul, Minnesota, in 1933. He attended Saint Paul's Johnson High School and the University of Minnesota, where he received a B.A. in 1954. He earned a law degree from the University of Minnesota Law School in 1960.

Anderson served in the United States Army from 1955 to 1957, reaching the rank of First Lieutenant. He later served with an intelligence unit in the Army Reserve.

== Hockey career ==
From 1951 to 1954, Anderson played defense for the University of Minnesota, where he made two NCAA Frozen Four runs in his final two seasons (the Gophers were defeated in back-to-back championship finals by the Michigan Wolverines and the RPI Bachelors). He was a member of the U.S. hockey team that won a silver medal at the 1956 Winter Olympics. Long after his on-ice career ended, he was drafted in 1972 by the Minnesota Fighting Saints in the inaugural World Hockey Association draft, in what was seen as a publicity stunt. (Not to be outdone, another WHA team selected Soviet Premier Alexei Kosygin.) Anderson chose to remain governor.

=== Career statistics ===
==== Regular season and playoffs ====
			Regular season					Playoffs
Season	Team	League	GP	G	A	Pts	PIM	GP	G	A	Pts	PIM
1950–51	St. Paul Johnson High School	USHS	—	—	—	—	—	—	—	—	—	—
1951–52	University of Minnesota	MCHL	3	1	1	2	2	—	—	—	—	—
1952–53	University of Minnesota	MCHL	32	2	6	8	26	—	—	—	—	—
1953–54	University of Minnesota	WIHL	28	4	11	15	18	—	—	—	—	—
1954–55	Minneapolis Bungalows	MNHL	—	—	—	—	—	—	—	—	—	—
1961–62	Minneapolis Rebels	USHL Sr.	—	—	—	—	—	—	—	—	—	—
College totals			63	7	19	25	46	—	—	—	—	—

==== International ====
Olympic medal record

Men's Ice hockey

Representing United States
Silver medal – second place	1956 Cortina d'Ampezzo	Ice hockey

Year	Team	Event	Result	GP	G	A	Pts	PIM
1955	United States	WC	4th	8	2	2	4	5
1956	United States	OLY	2nd place, silver medalist(s)	7	0	1	1	2
Totals				15	2	3	5	7

== Political career ==
Anderson served in the Minnesota House of Representatives from 1959 to 1963 and in the Minnesota State Senate from 1963 to 1971. He was elected governor of Minnesota in 1970.

Anderson's signature accomplishment as governor was to help create the "Minnesota Miracle of 1971", an innovative reform in financing of Minnesota public schools and local governments that created a fairer distribution in taxation and education. He began his plans to increase education funding immediately, and increased education funding in the state budget from 43% to 65%. The increases in the state's budget necessary to finance this were accomplished with sales taxes on cigarettes and alcohol, the progressive income tax he had promised in his campaign, and a raised inheritance tax. 96% of school districts saw funding increase while property taxes decreased. For his efforts, Anderson appeared on a 1973 cover of Time magazine. In 1972, Anderson endorsed a protest against the Vietnam War.

After U.S. Senator Walter Mondale was elected vice president in 1976, the governor had to appoint Mondale's successor. Anderson agreed with his lieutenant governor, Rudy Perpich, that Anderson would resign as governor, and Perpich, as the new governor, would appoint Anderson to the Senate.

In what became known as the "Minnesota Massacre", part of the DFL Party ticket was defeated in 1978, including Perpich and the candidates for both U.S. Senate seats, Anderson and Bob Short (the party held on to other posts, such as attorney general). Anderson's arrangement to have himself appointed to the Senate—and Perpich's role in that appointment—were deemed central factors in the defeats; Anderson said the move to appoint himself senator was his big mistake.

From 1989 to 2002, Anderson served as honorary consul general of Sweden in Minneapolis. From 1995 to 2001, he served as a director for and head of the legal committee of Turbodyne Technologies Inc. (TRBD) in Carpinteria, California. In his later years, he was regularly called upon to act as a commentator on Minnesota politics for local stations such as KSTP-TV.

== Personal life ==
Anderson married Mary Christine McKee (1939–2018) of Bemidji, Minnesota, in 1963. They had three children: Amy, Elizabeth, and Brett. They divorced in 1990.

In the 1970s, Anderson appeared on the TV game show What's My Line? A panel consisting of Gene Rayburn, Arlene Francis, Gene Shalit and Sheila MacRae was unable to guess that he was the governor of Minnesota.

In 1975, two of the Swedish District lodges of the Vasa Order of America selected Anderson as Swedish-American of the Year.

Anderson died on July 17, 2016, of complications of Alzheimer's disease at the age of 83. His cremated remains were buried in Lakewood Cemetery in August 2019.

Party political offices
Preceded by Karl Rolvaag	Democratic nominee for Governor of Minnesota; 1970, 1974	Succeeded by Rudy Perpich
Preceded by Wendell H. Ford	Chair of the Democratic Governors Association; 1974–1975	Succeeded by Philip W. Noel
Preceded by Walter Mondale	Democratic nominee for U.S. Senator from Minnesota (Class 2); 1978	Succeeded by Joan Growe
Political offices
Preceded by Harold LeVander	Governor of Minnesota; 1971–1976	Succeeded by Rudy Perpich
U.S. Senate
Preceded by Walter Mondale	United States Senator (Class 2) from Minnesota; 1976–1978; Served alongside: Hubert Humphrey, Muriel Humphrey, David Durenberger	Succeeded by Rudy Boschwitz
