= 1996 United States Senate election in Minnesota =

- November 5, 1996
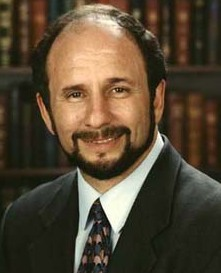

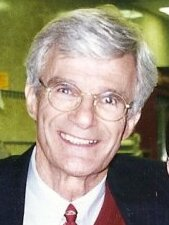

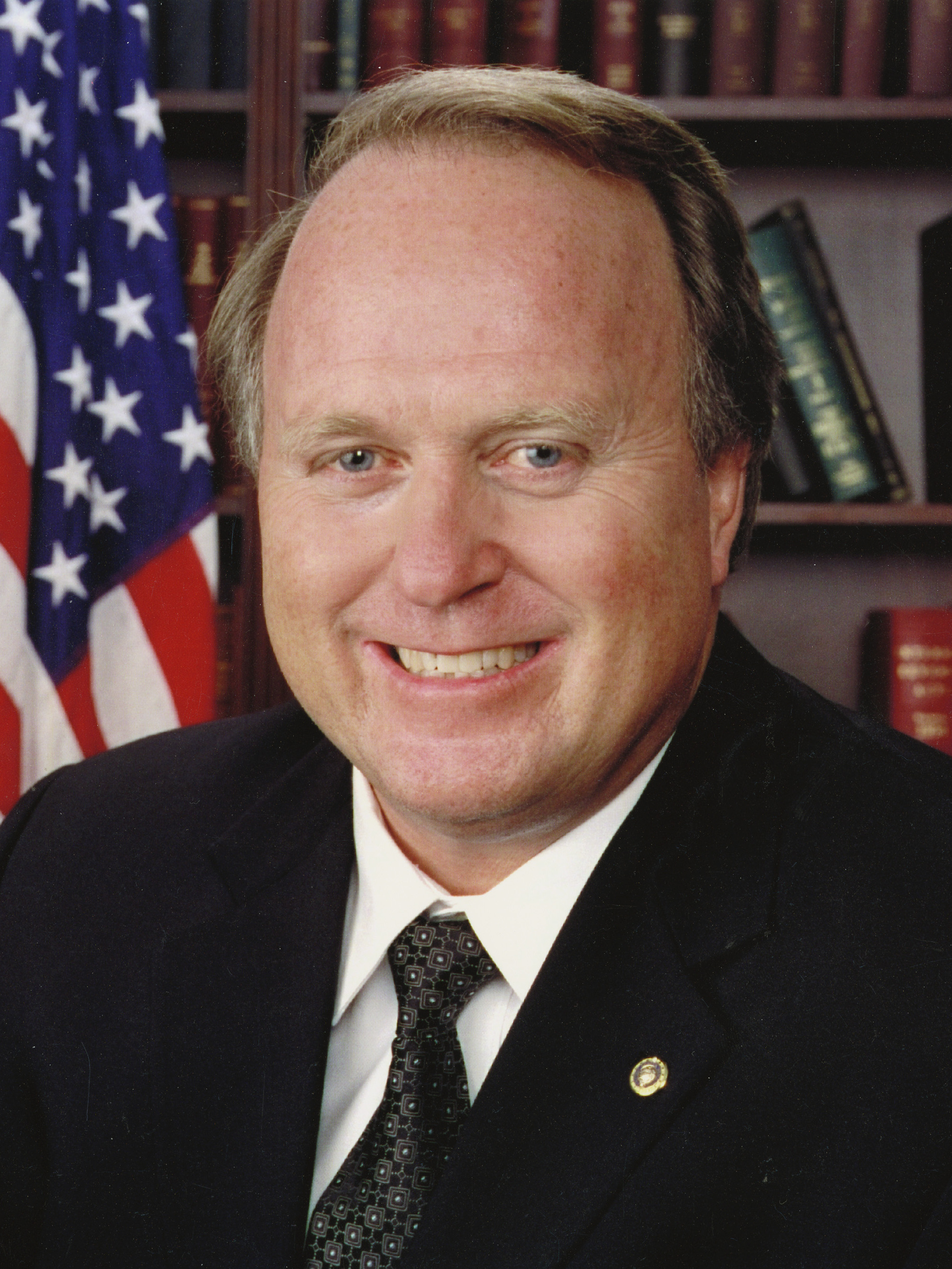
Nominee	Paul Wellstone	Rudy Boschwitz	Dean Barkley
Party	Democratic (DFL)	Republican	Reform
Popular vote	1,098,430	901,194	152,328
Percentage	50.32%	41.28%	6.98%
- Wellstone: 30–40% 40–50% 50–60% 60–70% 70–80% 80–90% >90% Boschwitz: 30–40% 40–50% 50–60% 60–70% 70–80% 80–90% Other: >90% Tie: 20–30% 30–40% 40–50% 50% No votes
U.S. senator before election
Paul Wellstone
Democratic (DFL)
Elected U.S. Senator
Paul Wellstone
Democratic (DFL)

The 1996 United States Senate election in Minnesota was held on November 5, 1996. Incumbent Democratic senator Paul Wellstone won re-election to a second term defeating Republican former senator Rudy Boschwitz in a rematch.

Primary elections were held on September 10. Both Wellstone and Boschwitz were easily nominated.

== DFL primary ==
=== Candidates ===
- Richard Franson, perennial candidate
- Ed Hansen, nudie film director and editor
- Ole Savior, perennial candidate
- Paul Wellstone, incumbent U.S. senator since 1991

=== Results ===
Democratic–Farmer–Labor primary results
Party	Candidate	Votes	%
Democratic (DFL)	Paul Wellstone (incumbent)	194,699	86.41%
Democratic (DFL)	Richard Franson	16,465	7.31%
Democratic (DFL)	Ed Hansen	9,990	4.43%
Democratic (DFL)	Oloveuse S. Savior	4,180	1.86%
Turnout		225,334	

== Republican primary ==
=== Candidates ===
- Rudy Boschwitz, former U.S. senator (1979–91)
- Bert McKasy, former Minnesota Commissioner of Commerce and state representative from Mendota Heights
- Monti Moreno, Stillwater businessman and salon owner
- Stephen Young
- John J. Zeleniak

=== Campaign ===
The Minnesota Republican convention declined to endorse a candidate, having deadlocked on fourteen ballots over two days. Although McKasy led on every ballot, he never received more than 56 percent of the delegates' vote. 60 percent was required for an endorsement. The non-endorsement was seen as a victory for Boschwitz, who was better known and more popular among the general Republican electorate.

=== Results ===
Republican primary results
Party	Candidate	Votes	%
Republican	Rudy Boschwitz	158,678	80.59%
Republican	Stephen Young	16,324	8.29%
Republican	Bert McKasy	12,711	6.46%
Republican	Monti Moreno	6,536	3.32%
Republican	John J. Zeleniak	2,655	1.35%
Turnout		196,904	

== General election ==
=== Candidates ===
- Dean Barkley, attorney and Independence Party nominee for U.S. Senate in 1994 (Reform)
- Rudy Boschwitz, former U.S. Senator (Republican)
- Roy Ezra Carlton (Libertarian)
- Tim Davis, marijuana legalization activist (Grassroots)
- Thomas A. Fiske (Socialist Workers)
- Howard Hanson (Resource)
- Steve Johnson (Natural Law)
- Paul Wellstone, incumbent U.S. Senator since 1991 (DFL)

=== Predictions ===
Source	Rating	As of
The Cook Political Report	Toss Up	October 23, 1996

=== Campaign ===
Wellstone had unseated the two-term senator Boschwitz in the 1990 election. Boschwitz filed for a rematch. He released ads calling Wellstone "embarrassingly liberal" and "Senator Welfare", and accused Wellstone of supporting flag burning, a move some believe backfired. As in 1990, Wellstone had a massive grassroots campaign that inspired college students, poor people and minorities to get involved in politics for the first time. Boschwitz significantly outspent Wellstone on campaign advertising and the race was closely contested, but Wellstone defeated Boschwitz by a nine-point margin in a three-way race. Dean Barkley received 7% of the vote and was appointed by Governor Jesse Ventura to serve the last 60 days of Wellstone's term after Wellstone died in a plane crash 11 days before the 2002 election.

=== Polling ===
Poll source	Date(s) administered	Sample size (Note: Key: A – all adults RV – registered voters LV – likely voters V – unclear)	Margin of error	Paul Wellstone (D)	Rudy Boschwitz (R)	Dean Barkley (Rf)	Undecided
Mason-Dixon (Note: Poll commissioned by Minnesota Public Radio, KARE (TV) & the St. Paul Pioneer Press)	September 1–3, 1996	803 (RV)	± 3.5%	46%	37%	4%	13%

Hypothetical polling

Wellstone vs. Moreno vs. Barkley

Poll source	Date(s) administered	Sample size	Margin of error	Paul Wellstone (D)	Monte Moreno (R)	Dean Barkley (Rf)	Undecided
Mason-Dixon	September 1–3, 1996	803 (RV)	± 3.5%	51%	20%	6%	23%

Wellstone vs. Young vs. Barkley

Poll source	Date(s) administered	Sample size	Margin of error	Paul Wellstone (D)	Steve Young (R)	Dean Barkley (Rf)	Undecided
Mason-Dixon	September 1–3, 1996	803 (RV)	± 3.5%	50%	21%	5%	24%

=== Debates ===
1996 United States Senate election in Minnesota debates
No.	Date	Host	Moderator	Link	Democratic	Republican	Reform
Key: P Participant A Absent N Not invited I Invited W Withdrawn							
Key: P Participant A Absent N Not invited I Invited W Withdrawn					Paul Wellstone	Rudy Boschwitz	Dean Barkley
1	Sep. 16, 1996	Minnesota Chamber of Commerce	Chris Conangla	C-SPAN	P	P	N
2	Oct. 29, 1996	Minnesota League of Women Voters; WCCO-TV	Virginia Sweeney	C-SPAN	P	P	P

=== Results ===
General election results
Party	Candidate	Votes	%
Democratic (DFL)	Paul Wellstone (incumbent)	1,098,430	50.32%
Republican	Rudy Boschwitz	901,194	41.28%
Reform	Dean Barkley	152,328	6.98%
Grassroots	Tim Davis	14,139	0.65%
Libertarian	Roy Ezra Carlton	5,428	0.25%
Resource Party	Howard Hanson	4,381	0.20%
Natural Law	Steve Johnson	4,321	0.20%
Socialist Workers	Thomas A. Fiske	1,554	0.07%
Write-in		1,130	0.05%
Total votes		2,182,905	100.00%
Democratic (DFL) hold			

== See also ==
- 1996 United States Senate elections

== Notes ==
Partisan clients
