= List of United States senators from Minnesota =

Current delegation

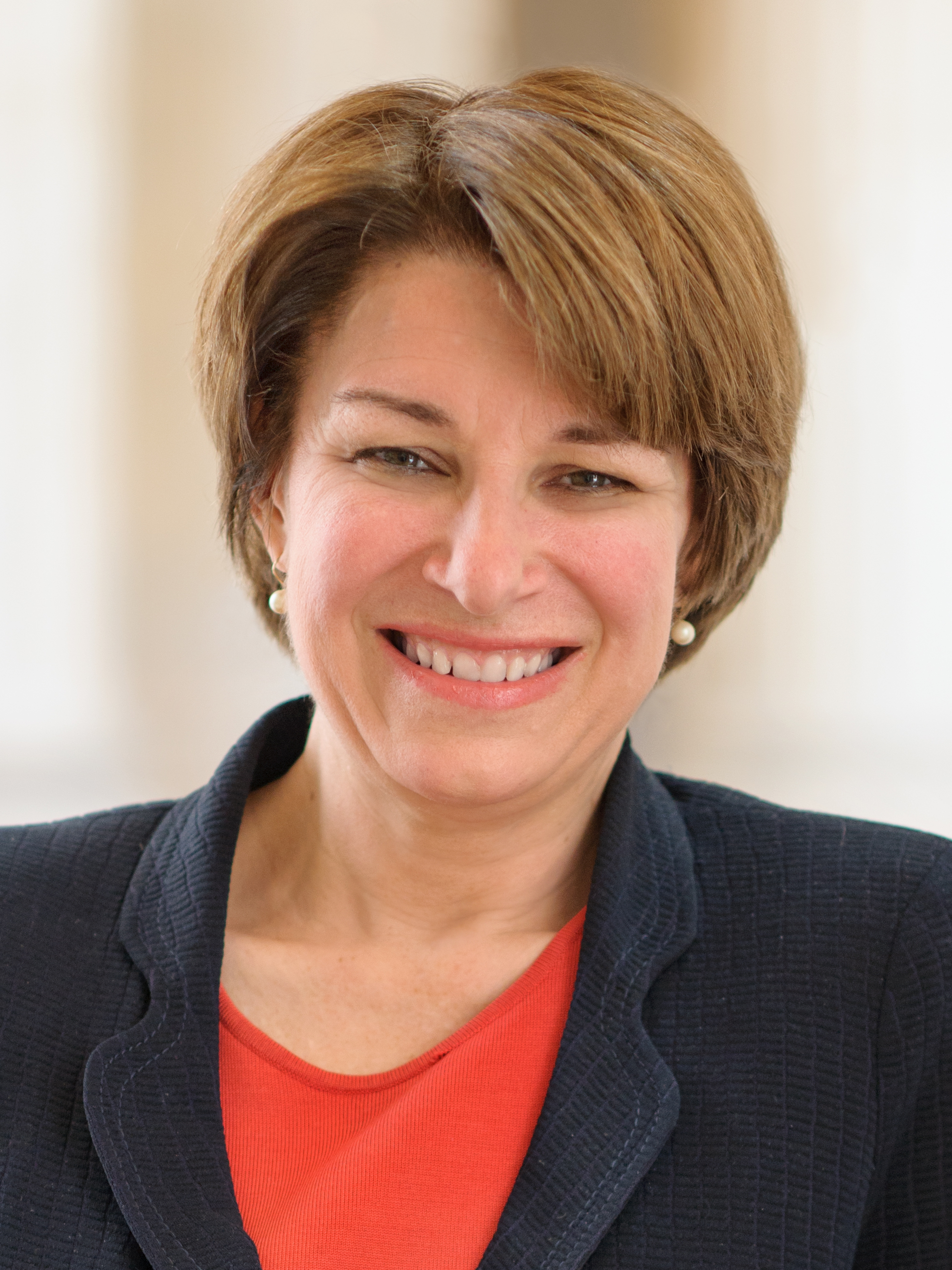
Amy Klobuchar (D)

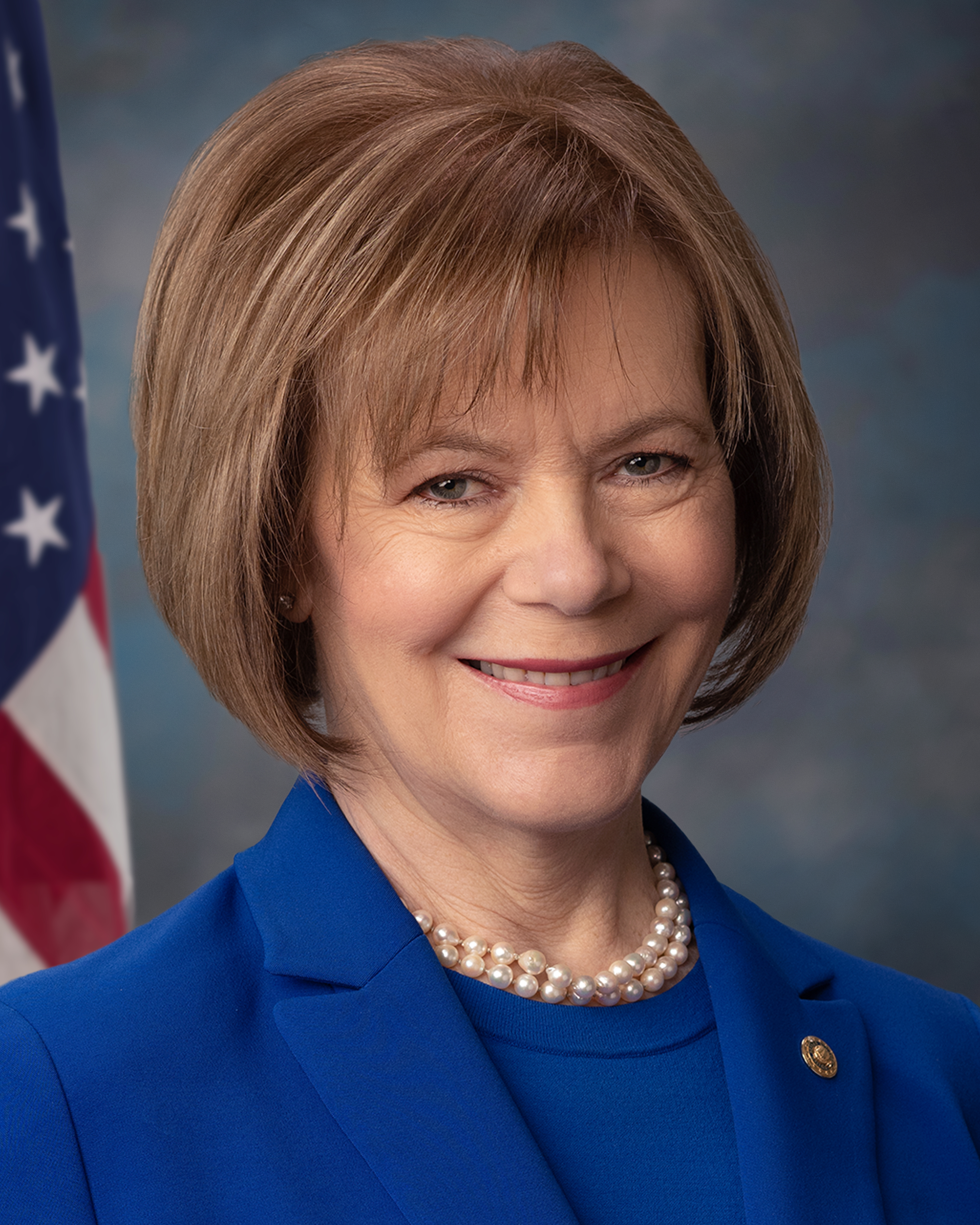
Tina Smith (D)

(ordered by seniority)

Minnesota was admitted to the Union on May 11, 1858. As of January 3, 2018, the state has had 44 people serve in the United States Senate. Its current U.S. senators are Democrats Amy Klobuchar (since 2007) and Tina Smith (since 2018), making it one of only four states to have two female U.S. senators alongside Nevada, New Hampshire and Washington. The appointment of Smith marked the first time the state had two female U.S. senators at any one time. Knute Nelson is Minnesota's longest-serving senator (1895–1923).

== List of senators ==
Class 1 Class 1 senators belong to the electoral cycle that most recently had regular elections in 2006, 2012, 2018, and 2024. The next election will be in 2030.						C	Class 2 Class 2 senators belong to the electoral cycle that most recently had regular elections in 2008, 2014, 2020, and 2026. The next election will be in 2032.					
#	Senator	Party	Dates in office	Electoral history	T	C	T	Electoral history	Dates in office	Party	Senator	#
1	Henry M. Rice (Saint Paul)	Democratic	May 11, 1858 – Mar 3, 1863	Elected in 1858. Retired.	1	35th	1	Elected in 1858. Lost re-election.	May 11, 1858 – Mar 3, 1859	Democratic	James Shields (Saint Paul)	1
1	Henry M. Rice (Saint Paul)	Democratic	May 11, 1858 – Mar 3, 1863	Elected in 1858. Retired.	1	36th	2	Elected in 1859. Lost re-election.	Mar 4, 1859 – Mar 3, 1865	Republican	Morton S. Wilkinson (Mankato)	2
1	Henry M. Rice (Saint Paul)	Democratic	May 11, 1858 – Mar 3, 1863	Elected in 1858. Retired.	1	37th	2	Elected in 1859. Lost re-election.	Mar 4, 1859 – Mar 3, 1865	Republican	Morton S. Wilkinson (Mankato)	2
2	Alexander Ramsey (Saint Paul)	Republican	Mar 4, 1863 – Mar 3, 1875	Elected in 1863.	2	38th	2	Elected in 1859. Lost re-election.	Mar 4, 1859 – Mar 3, 1865	Republican	Morton S. Wilkinson (Mankato)	2
2	Alexander Ramsey (Saint Paul)	Republican	Mar 4, 1863 – Mar 3, 1875	Elected in 1863.	2	39th	3	Elected in 1865. Died.	Mar 4, 1865 – Jul 14, 1870	Republican	Daniel S. Norton (Winona)	3
2	Alexander Ramsey (Saint Paul)	Republican	Mar 4, 1863 – Mar 3, 1875	Elected in 1863.	2	40th	3	Elected in 1865. Died.	Mar 4, 1865 – Jul 14, 1870	Republican	Daniel S. Norton (Winona)	3
2	Alexander Ramsey (Saint Paul)	Republican	Mar 4, 1863 – Mar 3, 1875	Re-elected in 1869. [data missing].	3	41st	3	Elected in 1865. Died.	Mar 4, 1865 – Jul 14, 1870	Republican	Daniel S. Norton (Winona)	3
2	Alexander Ramsey (Saint Paul)	Republican	Mar 4, 1863 – Mar 3, 1875	Re-elected in 1869. [data missing].	3	41st	3		Jul 14, 1870 – Jul 15, 1870	Vacant		
2	Alexander Ramsey (Saint Paul)	Republican	Mar 4, 1863 – Mar 3, 1875	Re-elected in 1869. [data missing].	3	41st	3	Appointed to continue Norton's term. Successor qualified.	Jul 15, 1870 – Jan 22, 1871	Republican	William Windom (Winona)	4
2	Alexander Ramsey (Saint Paul)	Republican	Mar 4, 1863 – Mar 3, 1875	Re-elected in 1869. [data missing].	3	41st	3	Elected in 1871 to finish Norton's term. Retired.	Jan 23, 1871 – Mar 3, 1871	Republican	Ozora P. Stearns (Rochester)	5
2	Alexander Ramsey (Saint Paul)	Republican	Mar 4, 1863 – Mar 3, 1875	Re-elected in 1869. [data missing].	3	42nd	4	Elected in 1871.	Mar 4, 1871 – Mar 7, 1881	Republican	William Windom (Winona)	6
2	Alexander Ramsey (Saint Paul)	Republican	Mar 4, 1863 – Mar 3, 1875	Re-elected in 1869. [data missing].	3	43rd	4	Elected in 1871.	Mar 4, 1871 – Mar 7, 1881	Republican	William Windom (Winona)	6
3	Samuel J. R. McMillan (Saint Paul)	Republican	Mar 4, 1875 – Mar 3, 1887	Elected in 1875.	4	44th	4	Elected in 1871.	Mar 4, 1871 – Mar 7, 1881	Republican	William Windom (Winona)	6
3	Samuel J. R. McMillan (Saint Paul)	Republican	Mar 4, 1875 – Mar 3, 1887	Elected in 1875.	4	45th	5	Re-elected in 1877. Resigned to become U.S. Secretary of the Treasury.	Mar 4, 1871 – Mar 7, 1881	Republican	William Windom (Winona)	6
3	Samuel J. R. McMillan (Saint Paul)	Republican	Mar 4, 1875 – Mar 3, 1887	Elected in 1875.	4	46th	5	Re-elected in 1877. Resigned to become U.S. Secretary of the Treasury.	Mar 4, 1871 – Mar 7, 1881	Republican	William Windom (Winona)	6
3	Samuel J. R. McMillan (Saint Paul)	Republican	Mar 4, 1875 – Mar 3, 1887	Re-elected in 1881. Retired.	5	47th	5	Re-elected in 1877. Resigned to become U.S. Secretary of the Treasury.	Mar 4, 1871 – Mar 7, 1881	Republican	William Windom (Winona)	6
3	Samuel J. R. McMillan (Saint Paul)	Republican	Mar 4, 1875 – Mar 3, 1887	Re-elected in 1881. Retired.	5	47th	5		Mar 7, 1881 – Mar 12, 1881	Vacant		
3	Samuel J. R. McMillan (Saint Paul)	Republican	Mar 4, 1875 – Mar 3, 1887	Re-elected in 1881. Retired.	5	47th	5	Appointed to continue Windom's term. Successor qualified.	Mar 12, 1881 – Oct 30, 1881	Republican	Alonzo J. Edgerton (Kasson)	7
3	Samuel J. R. McMillan (Saint Paul)	Republican	Mar 4, 1875 – Mar 3, 1887	Re-elected in 1881. Retired.	5	47th	5		Oct 30, 1881 – Nov 15, 1881	Vacant		
3	Samuel J. R. McMillan (Saint Paul)	Republican	Mar 4, 1875 – Mar 3, 1887	Re-elected in 1881. Retired.	5	47th	5	Elected in 1881 to finish his own term. Lost election to full term.	Nov 15, 1881 – Mar 3, 1883	Republican	William Windom (Winona)	8
3	Samuel J. R. McMillan (Saint Paul)	Republican	Mar 4, 1875 – Mar 3, 1887	Re-elected in 1881. Retired.	5	48th	6	Elected in 1883. Lost renomination.	Mar 4, 1883 – Mar 3, 1889	Republican	Dwight M. Sabin (Stillwater)	9
3	Samuel J. R. McMillan (Saint Paul)	Republican	Mar 4, 1875 – Mar 3, 1887	Re-elected in 1881. Retired.	5	49th	6	Elected in 1883. Lost renomination.	Mar 4, 1883 – Mar 3, 1889	Republican	Dwight M. Sabin (Stillwater)	9
4	Cushman K. Davis (Saint Paul)	Republican	Mar 4, 1887 – Nov 27, 1900	Elected in 1886.	6	50th	6	Elected in 1883. Lost renomination.	Mar 4, 1883 – Mar 3, 1889	Republican	Dwight M. Sabin (Stillwater)	9
4	Cushman K. Davis (Saint Paul)	Republican	Mar 4, 1887 – Nov 27, 1900	Elected in 1886.	6	51st	7	Elected in 1888. Lost re-election.	Mar 4, 1889 – Mar 3, 1895	Republican	William D. Washburn (Minneapolis)	10
4	Cushman K. Davis (Saint Paul)	Republican	Mar 4, 1887 – Nov 27, 1900	Elected in 1886.	6	52nd	7	Elected in 1888. Lost re-election.	Mar 4, 1889 – Mar 3, 1895	Republican	William D. Washburn (Minneapolis)	10
4	Cushman K. Davis (Saint Paul)	Republican	Mar 4, 1887 – Nov 27, 1900	Re-elected in 1892.	7	53rd	7	Elected in 1888. Lost re-election.	Mar 4, 1889 – Mar 3, 1895	Republican	William D. Washburn (Minneapolis)	10
4	Cushman K. Davis (Saint Paul)	Republican	Mar 4, 1887 – Nov 27, 1900	Re-elected in 1892.	7	54th	8	Elected in 1895.	Mar 4, 1895 – Apr 28, 1923	Republican	Knute Nelson (Alexandria)	11
4	Cushman K. Davis (Saint Paul)	Republican	Mar 4, 1887 – Nov 27, 1900	Re-elected in 1892.	7	55th	8	Elected in 1895.	Mar 4, 1895 – Apr 28, 1923	Republican	Knute Nelson (Alexandria)	11
4	Cushman K. Davis (Saint Paul)	Republican	Mar 4, 1887 – Nov 27, 1900	Re-elected in 1899. Died.	8	56th	8	Elected in 1895.	Mar 4, 1895 – Apr 28, 1923	Republican	Knute Nelson (Alexandria)	11
Vacant			Nov 27, 1900 – Dec 5, 1900		8	56th	8	Elected in 1895.	Mar 4, 1895 – Apr 28, 1923	Republican	Knute Nelson (Alexandria)	11
5	Charles A. Towne (Duluth)	Democratic	Dec 5, 1900 – Jan 23, 1901	Appointed to continue Davis's term. Successor qualified.	8	56th	8	Elected in 1895.	Mar 4, 1895 – Apr 28, 1923	Republican	Knute Nelson (Alexandria)	11
6	Moses E. Clapp (Saint Paul)	Republican	Jan 23, 1901 – Mar 3, 1917	Elected in 1901 to finish Davis's term	8	56th	8	Elected in 1895.	Mar 4, 1895 – Apr 28, 1923	Republican	Knute Nelson (Alexandria)	11
6	Moses E. Clapp (Saint Paul)	Republican	Jan 23, 1901 – Mar 3, 1917	Elected in 1901 to finish Davis's term	8	57th	9	Re-elected in 1901.	Mar 4, 1895 – Apr 28, 1923	Republican	Knute Nelson (Alexandria)	11
6	Moses E. Clapp (Saint Paul)	Republican	Jan 23, 1901 – Mar 3, 1917	Elected in 1901 to finish Davis's term	8	58th	9	Re-elected in 1901.	Mar 4, 1895 – Apr 28, 1923	Republican	Knute Nelson (Alexandria)	11
6	Moses E. Clapp (Saint Paul)	Republican	Jan 23, 1901 – Mar 3, 1917	Re-elected in 1905.	9	59th	9	Re-elected in 1901.	Mar 4, 1895 – Apr 28, 1923	Republican	Knute Nelson (Alexandria)	11
6	Moses E. Clapp (Saint Paul)	Republican	Jan 23, 1901 – Mar 3, 1917	Re-elected in 1905.	9	60th	10	Re-elected in 1907.	Mar 4, 1895 – Apr 28, 1923	Republican	Knute Nelson (Alexandria)	11
6	Moses E. Clapp (Saint Paul)	Republican	Jan 23, 1901 – Mar 3, 1917	Re-elected in 1905.	9	61st	10	Re-elected in 1907.	Mar 4, 1895 – Apr 28, 1923	Republican	Knute Nelson (Alexandria)	11
6	Moses E. Clapp (Saint Paul)	Republican	Jan 23, 1901 – Mar 3, 1917	Re-elected in 1911. Lost renomination.	10	62nd	10	Re-elected in 1907.	Mar 4, 1895 – Apr 28, 1923	Republican	Knute Nelson (Alexandria)	11
6	Moses E. Clapp (Saint Paul)	Republican	Jan 23, 1901 – Mar 3, 1917	Re-elected in 1911. Lost renomination.	10	63rd	11	Re-elected in 1913.	Mar 4, 1895 – Apr 28, 1923	Republican	Knute Nelson (Alexandria)	11
6	Moses E. Clapp (Saint Paul)	Republican	Jan 23, 1901 – Mar 3, 1917	Re-elected in 1911. Lost renomination.	10	64th	11	Re-elected in 1913.	Mar 4, 1895 – Apr 28, 1923	Republican	Knute Nelson (Alexandria)	11
7	Frank B. Kellogg (Saint Paul)	Republican	Mar 4, 1917 – Mar 3, 1923	Elected in 1916. Lost re-election.	11	65th	11	Re-elected in 1913.	Mar 4, 1895 – Apr 28, 1923	Republican	Knute Nelson (Alexandria)	11
7	Frank B. Kellogg (Saint Paul)	Republican	Mar 4, 1917 – Mar 3, 1923	Elected in 1916. Lost re-election.	11	66th	12	Re-elected in 1918. Died.	Mar 4, 1895 – Apr 28, 1923	Republican	Knute Nelson (Alexandria)	11
7	Frank B. Kellogg (Saint Paul)	Republican	Mar 4, 1917 – Mar 3, 1923	Elected in 1916. Lost re-election.	11	67th	12	Re-elected in 1918. Died.	Mar 4, 1895 – Apr 28, 1923	Republican	Knute Nelson (Alexandria)	11
8	Henrik Shipstead (Carlos)	Farmer– Labor	Mar 4, 1923 – Jan 3, 1947	Elected in 1922.	12	68th	12	Re-elected in 1918. Died.	Mar 4, 1895 – Apr 28, 1923	Republican	Knute Nelson (Alexandria)	11
8	Henrik Shipstead (Carlos)	Farmer– Labor	Mar 4, 1923 – Jan 3, 1947	Elected in 1922.	12	68th	12		Apr 28, 1923 – Jul 16, 1923	Vacant		
8	Henrik Shipstead (Carlos)	Farmer– Labor	Mar 4, 1923 – Jan 3, 1947	Elected in 1922.	12	68th	12	Elected in 1923 to finish Nelson's term. Lost election to full term.	Jul 16, 1923 – Mar 3, 1925	Farmer– Labor	Magnus Johnson (Kimball)	12
8	Henrik Shipstead (Carlos)	Farmer– Labor	Mar 4, 1923 – Jan 3, 1947	Elected in 1922.	12	69th	13	Elected in 1924.	Mar 4, 1925 – Dec 22, 1935	Republican	Thomas D. Schall (Excelsior)	13
8	Henrik Shipstead (Carlos)	Farmer– Labor	Mar 4, 1923 – Jan 3, 1947	Elected in 1922.	12	70th	13	Elected in 1924.	Mar 4, 1925 – Dec 22, 1935	Republican	Thomas D. Schall (Excelsior)	13
8	Henrik Shipstead (Carlos)	Farmer– Labor	Mar 4, 1923 – Jan 3, 1947	Re-elected in 1928.	13	71st	13	Elected in 1924.	Mar 4, 1925 – Dec 22, 1935	Republican	Thomas D. Schall (Excelsior)	13
8	Henrik Shipstead (Carlos)	Farmer– Labor	Mar 4, 1923 – Jan 3, 1947	Re-elected in 1928.	13	72nd	14	Re-elected in 1930. Died.	Mar 4, 1925 – Dec 22, 1935	Republican	Thomas D. Schall (Excelsior)	13
8	Henrik Shipstead (Carlos)	Farmer– Labor	Mar 4, 1923 – Jan 3, 1947	Re-elected in 1928.	13	73rd	14	Re-elected in 1930. Died.	Mar 4, 1925 – Dec 22, 1935	Republican	Thomas D. Schall (Excelsior)	13
8	Henrik Shipstead (Carlos)	Farmer– Labor	Mar 4, 1923 – Jan 3, 1947	Re-elected in 1934.	14	74th	14	Re-elected in 1930. Died.	Mar 4, 1925 – Dec 22, 1935	Republican	Thomas D. Schall (Excelsior)	13
8	Henrik Shipstead (Carlos)	Farmer– Labor	Mar 4, 1923 – Jan 3, 1947	Re-elected in 1934.	14	74th	14		Dec 22, 1935 – Dec 27, 1935	Vacant		
8	Henrik Shipstead (Carlos)	Farmer– Labor	Mar 4, 1923 – Jan 3, 1947	Re-elected in 1934.	14	74th	14	Appointed to continue Schall's term. Retired when successor elected.	Dec 27, 1935 – Nov 3, 1936	Farmer– Labor	Elmer A. Benson (Appleton)	14
8	Henrik Shipstead (Carlos)	Farmer– Labor	Mar 4, 1923 – Jan 3, 1947	Re-elected in 1934.	14	74th	14	Elected in 1936 to finish Schall's term. Retired.	Nov 4, 1936 – Jan 3, 1937	Republican	Guy V. Howard (Minneapolis)	15
8	Henrik Shipstead (Carlos)	Farmer– Labor	Mar 4, 1923 – Jan 3, 1947	Re-elected in 1934.	14	75th	15	Elected in 1936. Died.	Jan 3, 1937 – Aug 31, 1940	Farmer– Labor	Ernest Lundeen (Wayzata)	16
8	Henrik Shipstead (Carlos)	Farmer– Labor	Mar 4, 1923 – Jan 3, 1947	Re-elected in 1934.	14	76th	15	Elected in 1936. Died.	Jan 3, 1937 – Aug 31, 1940	Farmer– Labor	Ernest Lundeen (Wayzata)	16
8	Henrik Shipstead (Carlos)	Farmer– Labor	Mar 4, 1923 – Jan 3, 1947	Re-elected in 1934.	14	76th	15		Aug 31, 1940 – Oct 14, 1940	Vacant		
8	Henrik Shipstead (Carlos)	Farmer– Labor	Mar 4, 1923 – Jan 3, 1947	Re-elected in 1934.	14	76th	15	Appointed to continue Lundeen's term. Retired when successor elected, but elected to next full term.	Oct 14, 1940 – Nov 17, 1942	Republican	Joseph H. Ball (Saint Paul)	17
8	Henrik Shipstead (Carlos)	Republican	Mar 4, 1923 – Jan 3, 1947	Re-elected in 1940. Lost renomination.	15	77th	15	Appointed to continue Lundeen's term. Retired when successor elected, but elected to next full term.	Oct 14, 1940 – Nov 17, 1942	Republican	Joseph H. Ball (Saint Paul)	17
8	Henrik Shipstead (Carlos)	Republican	Mar 4, 1923 – Jan 3, 1947	Re-elected in 1940. Lost renomination.	15	77th	15		Nov 17, 1942 – Nov 18, 1942	Vacant		
8	Henrik Shipstead (Carlos)	Republican	Mar 4, 1923 – Jan 3, 1947	Re-elected in 1940. Lost renomination.	15	77th	15	Elected in 1942 to finish Lundeen's term. Retired.	Nov 18, 1942 – Jan 3, 1943	Republican	Arthur E. Nelson (Saint Paul)	18
8	Henrik Shipstead (Carlos)	Republican	Mar 4, 1923 – Jan 3, 1947	Re-elected in 1940. Lost renomination.	15	78th	16	Elected in 1942. Lost re-election.	Jan 3, 1943 – Jan 3, 1949	Republican	Joseph H. Ball (Stillwater)	19
8	Henrik Shipstead (Carlos)	Republican	Mar 4, 1923 – Jan 3, 1947	Re-elected in 1940. Lost renomination.	15	79th	16	Elected in 1942. Lost re-election.	Jan 3, 1943 – Jan 3, 1949	Republican	Joseph H. Ball (Stillwater)	19
9	Edward J. Thye (Northfield)	Republican	Jan 3, 1947 – Jan 3, 1959	Elected in 1946.	16	80th	16	Elected in 1942. Lost re-election.	Jan 3, 1943 – Jan 3, 1949	Republican	Joseph H. Ball (Stillwater)	19
9	Edward J. Thye (Northfield)	Republican	Jan 3, 1947 – Jan 3, 1959	Elected in 1946.	16	81st	17	Elected in 1948.	Jan 3, 1949 – Dec 29, 1964	DFL	Hubert Humphrey (Waverly)	20
9	Edward J. Thye (Northfield)	Republican	Jan 3, 1947 – Jan 3, 1959	Elected in 1946.	16	82nd	17	Elected in 1948.	Jan 3, 1949 – Dec 29, 1964	DFL	Hubert Humphrey (Waverly)	20
9	Edward J. Thye (Northfield)	Republican	Jan 3, 1947 – Jan 3, 1959	Re-elected in 1952. Lost re-election.	17	83rd	17	Elected in 1948.	Jan 3, 1949 – Dec 29, 1964	DFL	Hubert Humphrey (Waverly)	20
9	Edward J. Thye (Northfield)	Republican	Jan 3, 1947 – Jan 3, 1959	Re-elected in 1952. Lost re-election.	17	84th	18	Re-elected in 1954.	Jan 3, 1949 – Dec 29, 1964	DFL	Hubert Humphrey (Waverly)	20
9	Edward J. Thye (Northfield)	Republican	Jan 3, 1947 – Jan 3, 1959	Re-elected in 1952. Lost re-election.	17	85th	18	Re-elected in 1954.	Jan 3, 1949 – Dec 29, 1964	DFL	Hubert Humphrey (Waverly)	20
10	Eugene McCarthy (Saint Paul)	DFL	Jan 3, 1959 – Jan 3, 1971	Elected in 1958.	18	86th	18	Re-elected in 1954.	Jan 3, 1949 – Dec 29, 1964	DFL	Hubert Humphrey (Waverly)	20
10	Eugene McCarthy (Saint Paul)	DFL	Jan 3, 1959 – Jan 3, 1971	Elected in 1958.	18	87th	19	Re-elected in 1960. Resigned to become U.S. Vice President.	Jan 3, 1949 – Dec 29, 1964	DFL	Hubert Humphrey (Waverly)	20
10	Eugene McCarthy (Saint Paul)	DFL	Jan 3, 1959 – Jan 3, 1971	Elected in 1958.	18	88th	19	Re-elected in 1960. Resigned to become U.S. Vice President.	Jan 3, 1949 – Dec 29, 1964	DFL	Hubert Humphrey (Waverly)	20
10	Eugene McCarthy (Saint Paul)	DFL	Jan 3, 1959 – Jan 3, 1971	Elected in 1958.	18	88th	19	Appointed to finish Humphrey's term.	Dec 30, 1964 – Dec 30, 1976	DFL	Walter Mondale (Minneapolis)	21
10	Eugene McCarthy (Saint Paul)	DFL	Jan 3, 1959 – Jan 3, 1971	Re-elected in 1964. Retired.	19	89th	19	Appointed to finish Humphrey's term.	Dec 30, 1964 – Dec 30, 1976	DFL	Walter Mondale (Minneapolis)	21
10	Eugene McCarthy (Saint Paul)	DFL	Jan 3, 1959 – Jan 3, 1971	Re-elected in 1964. Retired.	19	90th	20	Elected to full term in 1966.	Dec 30, 1964 – Dec 30, 1976	DFL	Walter Mondale (Minneapolis)	21
10	Eugene McCarthy (Saint Paul)	DFL	Jan 3, 1959 – Jan 3, 1971	Re-elected in 1964. Retired.	19	91st	20	Elected to full term in 1966.	Dec 30, 1964 – Dec 30, 1976	DFL	Walter Mondale (Minneapolis)	21
11	Hubert Humphrey (Waverly)	DFL	Jan 3, 1971 – Jan 13, 1978	Elected in 1970.	20	92nd	20	Elected to full term in 1966.	Dec 30, 1964 – Dec 30, 1976	DFL	Walter Mondale (Minneapolis)	21
11	Hubert Humphrey (Waverly)	DFL	Jan 3, 1971 – Jan 13, 1978	Elected in 1970.	20	93rd	21	Re-elected in 1972. Resigned to become U.S. Vice President.	Dec 30, 1964 – Dec 30, 1976	DFL	Walter Mondale (Minneapolis)	21
11	Hubert Humphrey (Waverly)	DFL	Jan 3, 1971 – Jan 13, 1978	Elected in 1970.	20	94th	21	Re-elected in 1972. Resigned to become U.S. Vice President.	Dec 30, 1964 – Dec 30, 1976	DFL	Walter Mondale (Minneapolis)	21
11	Hubert Humphrey (Waverly)	DFL	Jan 3, 1971 – Jan 13, 1978	Elected in 1970.	20	94th	21	Appointed to finish Mondale's term. Lost election to full term. Resigned early to give successor preferential seniority.	Dec 30, 1976 – Dec 29, 1978	DFL	Wendell Anderson (Saint Paul)	22
11	Hubert Humphrey (Waverly)	DFL	Jan 3, 1971 – Jan 13, 1978	Re-elected in 1976. Died.	21	95th	21	Appointed to finish Mondale's term. Lost election to full term. Resigned early to give successor preferential seniority.	Dec 30, 1976 – Dec 29, 1978	DFL	Wendell Anderson (Saint Paul)	22
Vacant			Jan 13, 1978 – Jan 25, 1978		21	95th	21	Appointed to finish Mondale's term. Lost election to full term. Resigned early to give successor preferential seniority.	Dec 30, 1976 – Dec 29, 1978	DFL	Wendell Anderson (Saint Paul)	22
12	Muriel Humphrey (Waverly)	DFL	Jan 25, 1978 – Nov 7, 1978	Appointed to continue her husband's term. Was not a candidate to finish the term. Successor qualified.	21	95th	21	Appointed to finish Mondale's term. Lost election to full term. Resigned early to give successor preferential seniority.	Dec 30, 1976 – Dec 29, 1978	DFL	Wendell Anderson (Saint Paul)	22
13	David Durenberger (Avon)	Independent- Republican	Nov 7, 1978 – Jan 3, 1995	Elected in 1978 to finish Hubert Humphrey's term.	21	95th	21	Appointed to finish Mondale's term. Lost election to full term. Resigned early to give successor preferential seniority.	Dec 30, 1976 – Dec 29, 1978	DFL	Wendell Anderson (Saint Paul)	22
13	David Durenberger (Avon)	Independent- Republican	Nov 7, 1978 – Jan 3, 1995	Elected in 1978 to finish Hubert Humphrey's term.	21	95th	21	Appointed early to finish Mondale's term, having already been elected to the next term.	Dec 30, 1978 – Jan 3, 1991	Independent- Republican	Rudy Boschwitz (Plymouth)	23
13	David Durenberger (Avon)	Independent- Republican	Nov 7, 1978 – Jan 3, 1995	Elected in 1978 to finish Hubert Humphrey's term.	21	96th	22	Elected in 1978.	Dec 30, 1978 – Jan 3, 1991	Independent- Republican	Rudy Boschwitz (Plymouth)	23
13	David Durenberger (Avon)	Independent- Republican	Nov 7, 1978 – Jan 3, 1995	Elected in 1978 to finish Hubert Humphrey's term.	21	97th	22	Elected in 1978.	Dec 30, 1978 – Jan 3, 1991	Independent- Republican	Rudy Boschwitz (Plymouth)	23
13	David Durenberger (Avon)	Independent- Republican	Nov 7, 1978 – Jan 3, 1995	Re-elected in 1982.	22	98th	22	Elected in 1978.	Dec 30, 1978 – Jan 3, 1991	Independent- Republican	Rudy Boschwitz (Plymouth)	23
13	David Durenberger (Avon)	Independent- Republican	Nov 7, 1978 – Jan 3, 1995	Re-elected in 1982.	22	99th	23	Re-elected in 1984. Lost re-election.	Dec 30, 1978 – Jan 3, 1991	Independent- Republican	Rudy Boschwitz (Plymouth)	23
13	David Durenberger (Avon)	Independent- Republican	Nov 7, 1978 – Jan 3, 1995	Re-elected in 1982.	22	100th	23	Re-elected in 1984. Lost re-election.	Dec 30, 1978 – Jan 3, 1991	Independent- Republican	Rudy Boschwitz (Plymouth)	23
13	David Durenberger (Avon)	Independent- Republican	Nov 7, 1978 – Jan 3, 1995	Re-elected in 1988. Retired.	23	101st	23	Re-elected in 1984. Lost re-election.	Dec 30, 1978 – Jan 3, 1991	Independent- Republican	Rudy Boschwitz (Plymouth)	23
13	David Durenberger (Avon)	Independent- Republican	Nov 7, 1978 – Jan 3, 1995	Re-elected in 1988. Retired.	23	102nd	24	Elected in 1990.	Jan 3, 1991 – Oct 25, 2002	DFL	Paul Wellstone (Northfield)	24
13	David Durenberger (Avon)	Independent- Republican	Nov 7, 1978 – Jan 3, 1995	Re-elected in 1988. Retired.	23	103rd	24	Elected in 1990.	Jan 3, 1991 – Oct 25, 2002	DFL	Paul Wellstone (Northfield)	24
14	Rod Grams (Ramsey)	Independent- Republican	Jan 3, 1995 – Jan 3, 2001	Elected in 1994. Lost re-election.	24	104th	24	Elected in 1990.	Jan 3, 1991 – Oct 25, 2002	DFL	Paul Wellstone (Northfield)	24
14	Rod Grams (Ramsey)	Independent- Republican	Jan 3, 1995 – Jan 3, 2001	Elected in 1994. Lost re-election.	24	105th	25	Re-elected in 1996. Died. (Note: Wellstone died before the general election when he was already the Democratic (DFL) nominee.)	Jan 3, 1991 – Oct 25, 2002	DFL	Paul Wellstone (Northfield)	24
14	Rod Grams (Ramsey)	Independent- Republican	Jan 3, 1995 – Jan 3, 2001	Elected in 1994. Lost re-election.	24	106th	25	Re-elected in 1996. Died.	Jan 3, 1991 – Oct 25, 2002	DFL	Paul Wellstone (Northfield)	24
15	Mark Dayton (Minneapolis)	DFL	Jan 3, 2001 – Jan 3, 2007	Elected in 2000. Retired.	25	107th	25	Re-elected in 1996. Died.	Jan 3, 1991 – Oct 25, 2002	DFL	Paul Wellstone (Northfield)	24
15	Mark Dayton (Minneapolis)	DFL	Jan 3, 2001 – Jan 3, 2007	Elected in 2000. Retired.	25	107th	25		Oct 25, 2002 – Nov 4, 2002	Vacant		
15	Mark Dayton (Minneapolis)	DFL	Jan 3, 2001 – Jan 3, 2007	Elected in 2000. Retired.	25	107th	25	Appointed to finish Wellstone's term. Was not a candidate for the next term.	Nov 4, 2002 – Jan 3, 2003	Independence	Dean Barkley (Annandale)	25
15	Mark Dayton (Minneapolis)	DFL	Jan 3, 2001 – Jan 3, 2007	Elected in 2000. Retired.	25	108th	26	Elected in 2002. Term expired before election dispute. Lost re-election.	Jan 3, 2003 – Jan 3, 2009	Republican	Norm Coleman (Saint Paul)	26
15	Mark Dayton (Minneapolis)	DFL	Jan 3, 2001 – Jan 3, 2007	Elected in 2000. Retired.	25	109th	26	Elected in 2002. Term expired before election dispute. Lost re-election.	Jan 3, 2003 – Jan 3, 2009	Republican	Norm Coleman (Saint Paul)	26
16	Amy Klobuchar (Minneapolis)	DFL	Jan 3, 2007 – present	Elected in 2006.	26	110th	26	Elected in 2002. Term expired before election dispute. Lost re-election.	Jan 3, 2003 – Jan 3, 2009	Republican	Norm Coleman (Saint Paul)	26
16	Amy Klobuchar (Minneapolis)	DFL	Jan 3, 2007 – present	Elected in 2006.	26	111th	27	Election disputed.	Jan 3, 2009 – Jul 7, 2009	Vacant		
16	Amy Klobuchar (Minneapolis)	DFL	Jan 3, 2007 – present	Elected in 2006.	26	111th	27	Elected in 2008, but was not seated until July 2009.	Jul 7, 2009 – Jan 2, 2018	DFL	Al Franken (Minneapolis)	27
16	Amy Klobuchar (Minneapolis)	DFL	Jan 3, 2007 – present	Elected in 2006.	26	112th	27	Elected in 2008, but was not seated until July 2009.	Jul 7, 2009 – Jan 2, 2018	DFL	Al Franken (Minneapolis)	27
16	Amy Klobuchar (Minneapolis)	DFL	Jan 3, 2007 – present	Re-elected in 2012.	27	113th	27	Elected in 2008, but was not seated until July 2009.	Jul 7, 2009 – Jan 2, 2018	DFL	Al Franken (Minneapolis)	27
16	Amy Klobuchar (Minneapolis)	DFL	Jan 3, 2007 – present	Re-elected in 2012.	27	114th	28	Re-elected in 2014. Resigned.	Jul 7, 2009 – Jan 2, 2018	DFL	Al Franken (Minneapolis)	27
16	Amy Klobuchar (Minneapolis)	DFL	Jan 3, 2007 – present	Re-elected in 2012.	27	115th	28	Re-elected in 2014. Resigned.	Jul 7, 2009 – Jan 2, 2018	DFL	Al Franken (Minneapolis)	27
16	Amy Klobuchar (Minneapolis)	DFL	Jan 3, 2007 – present	Re-elected in 2012.	27	115th	28	Appointed to continue Franken's term. Elected in 2018 to finish Franken's term.	Jan 3, 2018 – present	DFL	Tina Smith (Minneapolis)	28
16	Amy Klobuchar (Minneapolis)	DFL	Jan 3, 2007 – present	Re-elected in 2018.	28	116th	28	Appointed to continue Franken's term. Elected in 2018 to finish Franken's term.	Jan 3, 2018 – present	DFL	Tina Smith (Minneapolis)	28
16	Amy Klobuchar (Minneapolis)	DFL	Jan 3, 2007 – present	Re-elected in 2018.	28	117th	29	Re-elected in 2020. Retiring at the end of term.	Jan 3, 2018 – present	DFL	Tina Smith (Minneapolis)	28
16	Amy Klobuchar (Minneapolis)	DFL	Jan 3, 2007 – present	Re-elected in 2018.	28	118th	29	Re-elected in 2020. Retiring at the end of term.	Jan 3, 2018 – present	DFL	Tina Smith (Minneapolis)	28
16	Amy Klobuchar (Minneapolis)	DFL	Jan 3, 2007 – present	Re-elected in 2024. Resigning to become governor of Minnesota.	29	119th	29	Re-elected in 2020. Retiring at the end of term.	Jan 3, 2018 – present	DFL	Tina Smith (Minneapolis)	28
17	TBD		TBD	Appointed to continue Klobuchar's term.	29	120th	30	Elected in 2026.	Taking office Jan 3, 2027	DFL	Peggy Flanagan (elect) (St. Louis Park)	29
To be determined in the 2027 special election.					29	120th	30	Elected in 2026.	Taking office Jan 3, 2027	DFL	Peggy Flanagan (elect) (St. Louis Park)	29
To be determined in the 2027 special election.					29	121st	30	Elected in 2026.	Taking office Jan 3, 2027	DFL	Peggy Flanagan (elect) (St. Louis Park)	29
To be determined in the 2030 election.					30	122nd	30	Elected in 2026.	Taking office Jan 3, 2027	DFL	Peggy Flanagan (elect) (St. Louis Park)	29
To be determined in the 2030 election.					30	123rd	30	To be determined in the 2032 election.				

== See also ==
- Elections in Minnesota
- List of United States representatives from Minnesota
- Minnesota's congressional delegations
