= Philip Gould, Baron Gould of Brookwood =

British political consultant (1950–2011)

The Right Honourable The Lord Gould of Brookwood
- Born: 30 March 1950
- Died: 6 November 2011 (aged 61); Royal Marsden Hospital
- Education: East London College; University of Sussex; London School of Economics
- Occupation: Political consultant
- Organizations: Labour Party; Philip Gould Associates
- Spouse: Gail Rebuck (m. 1985)
- Children: 2, including Georgia

Member of the House of Lords
- Lord Temporal
- Life peerage 7 June 2004 – 6 November 2011

Philip Gould, Baron Gould of Brookwood (30 March 1950 – 6 November 2011) was a British political consultant, and former advertising executive, who worked for the Labour Party.

Appointed by Director of Communications Peter Mandelson, he was strategy and polling adviser to the Labour Party in the general elections of 1987, 1992, 1997, 2001 and 2005. Involved in 'modernising' the party's image, Gould was particularly associated with Tony Blair and New Labour.

== Early life and education ==
Gould grew up in Woking as the son of a headmaster, but failed his 11-plus and went to a secondary modern school. Leaving school with only one O-level, he went on to study at East London College, based in Toynbee Hall, where he gained four A-levels. He subsequently won a place at the University of Sussex in 1971 to study politics, graduating in 1974.

Gould went to the London School of Economics (LSE) to study for an MSc in the history of political thought, where he was taught by the political scientist Michael Oakeshott. Later he returned to the LSE to teach a course in Modern Campaigning Politics.

== Career ==
Following a career in advertising, and with the success of his wife Gail Rebuck (later CEO of Random House UK), whom he had met at Sussex, Gould founded his own polling and strategy company, Philip Gould Associates, in 1985. Appointed by Mandelson, Gould recruited the Shadow Communications Agency, a team of communications volunteers who created Labour's unsuccessful 1987 election campaign. This led to his position of influence within the Labour Party under Neil Kinnock and Tony Blair.

In 1992, he planned the Sheffield Rally for the Labour Party, eight days before its loss of the 1992 general election.

Gould was the author of a leaked memo which, in 2000, described the New Labour brand as being contaminated.

On 7 June 2004 he was created a life peer taking the title Baron Gould of Brookwood, of Brookwood in the County of Surrey.

In 2007, he assumed a non-executive director role at Freud Communications, the firm of Blair's former diary secretary, Kate Garvey.

== Illness ==
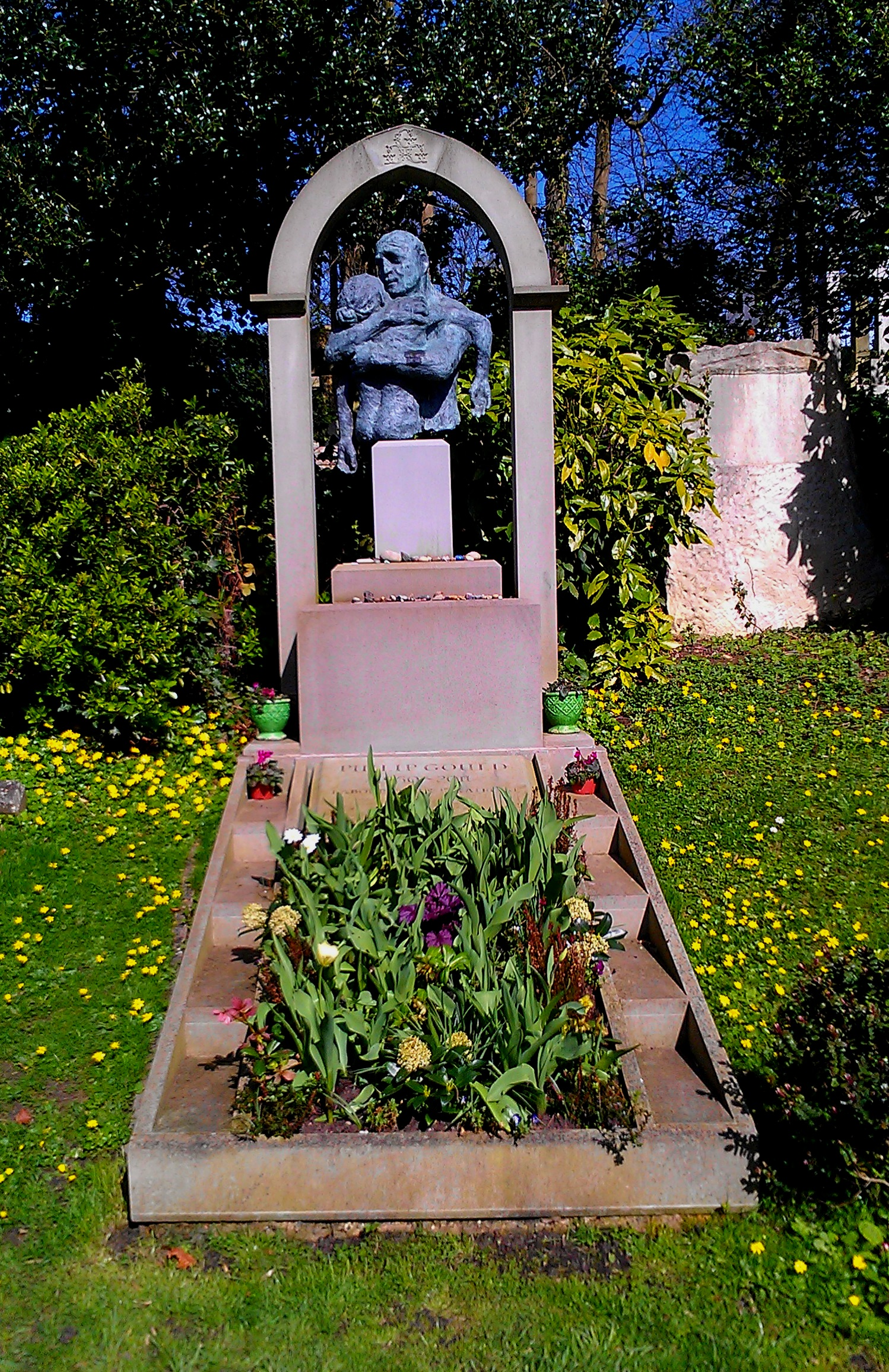
Gould's grave in the western end of East Highgate Cemetery

Preceding an interview with Andrew Marr on a Sunday morning BBC TV show on 18 September 2011, it was revealed that his treatment for three-times recurring cancer of the oesophagus had been unsuccessful. After being told by his doctor that he only had three months to live, Gould described himself as being in the "death zone":

This time it was clear. I was, you know... I was in a different place, a death zone, where there was such an intensity, such a power. And apparently this is normal. And so, even though obviously I'd, you know, rather not be in this position, it is the most extraordinary time of my life, certainly the most important time of my life.

Gould then turned his impending death into a campaign as a way of making his departure easier for his wife and daughters as well as helping others by writing and talking about facing up to death. His efforts resulted in an eight–minute film entitled, When I Die: Lessons from the Death Zone, a documentary of Gould's final weeks of life that was released on the video–sharing website YouTube before the release of his book by the same name.

== Death ==
Gould died on 6 November 2011 at the Royal Marsden Hospital, a specialist cancer treatment hospital in London.

It was stated that proceeds from his 2012 book When I Die: Lessons from the Death Zone would go to the National Oesophago–Gastric Cancer Fund and the Royal Marsden Cancer Charity. Before he died, Gould stated that he would be cremated and his urn interred at Highgate Cemetery.

== Works ==
- Gould, Philip (1999). The Unfinished Revolution: How the Modernisers Saved the Labour Party, Abacus, ISBN 0-349-11177-4
- Gould, Philip (2011). The Unfinished Revolution: How New Labour Changed British Politics Forever, Abacus, ISBN 0-349-13857-5
- Gould, Philip (2012). When I Die: Lessons from the Death Zone, Little Brown, ISBN 978-1-4087-0398-4

== Biography ==
- Dennis Kavanagh (2012). Philip Gould: An Unfinished Life, Palgrave Macmillan, ISBN 978-1137281128

== Arms ==
Coat of arms of Philip Gould, Baron Gould of Brookwood

Adopted
2007
Coronet
Coronet of a Baron
Crest
A Badger sejant erect Azure head and chest Argent eyes striped Azure gorged with a plain Collar studded Or and grasping in the dexter forepaw a Quill palewise

Argent spined Or

Escutcheon
Azure on a Bend nowy lozengy per bend Argent and Or a Bendlet Azure
Supporters
On either side a Badger Azure the head and chest Argent eyes striped Azure gorged with a plain Collar studded Or and holding in the mouth a Rose Gules barbed seeded slipped and leaved Or
Motto
CREDE POPULO
Badge
A Roundel set with ten Acorns leaved Or and charged with a Badger's Face Argent eyes striped Azure
Symbolism
The Arms reflect the grantee's wish for simplicity as well as suggesting a graph or opinion poll. The roses refer to the grantee's part in the choice of the red rose as the emblem of the Labour party. The badgers and acorns are an obvious pun on Brookwood.
