= Dean Barkley =

American lawyer and politician (born 1950)

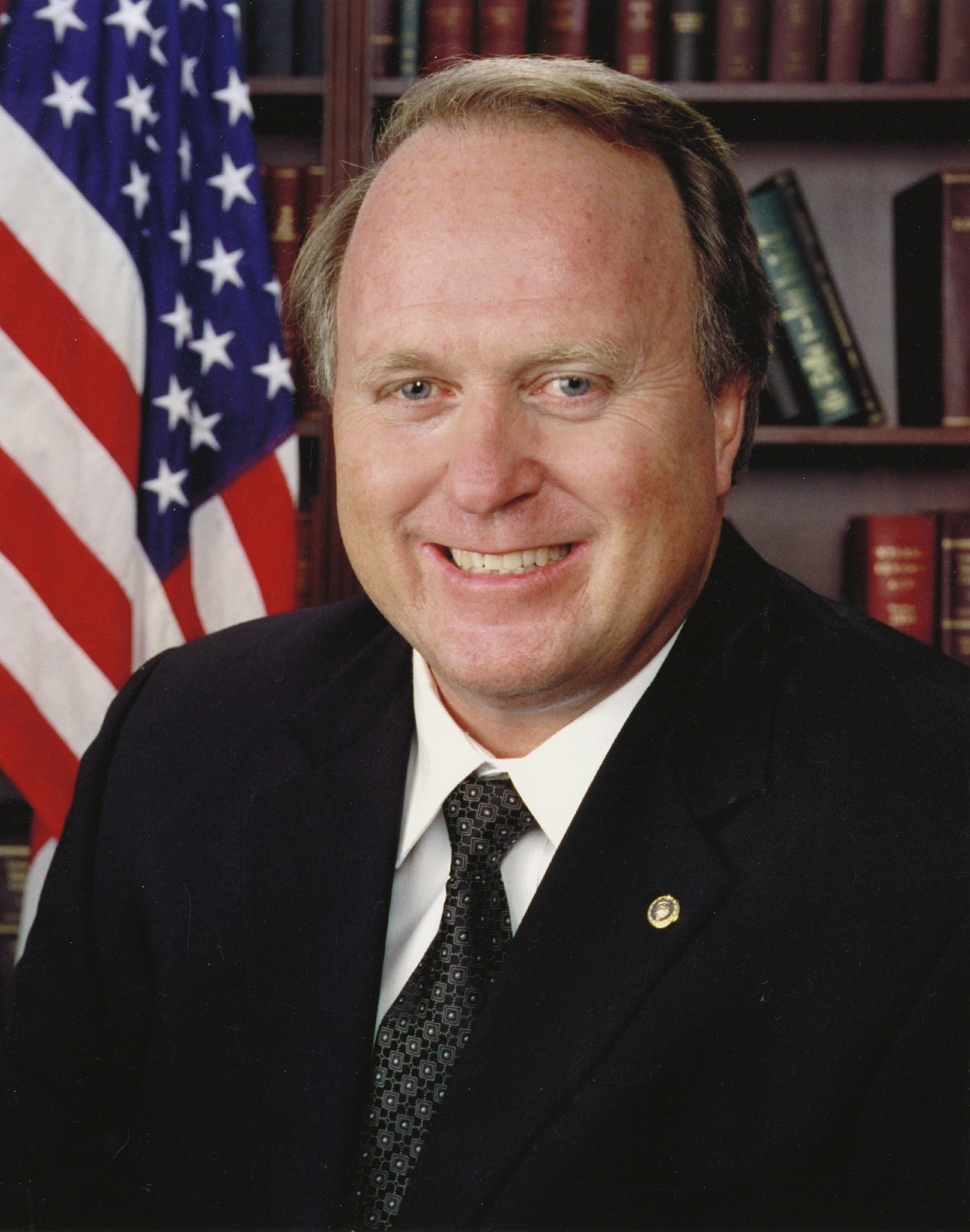
- Official portrait, 2002

United States Senator from Minnesota
- In office November 4, 2002 – January 3, 2003
- Appointed by: Jesse Ventura
- Preceded by: Paul Wellstone
- Succeeded by: Norm Coleman

Personal details
- Born: Dean Malcolm Barkley; August 31, 1950 (age 76) Annandale, Minnesota, U.S.
- Party: Independence (1992–present)
- Other political affiliations: Democratic (before 1980); Independent (1980–1992)
- Education: University of Minnesota (BA, JD)

Dean Malcolm Barkley (born August 31, 1950) is an American attorney and politician who served as a United States senator from Minnesota from 2002 to 2003 as a member of the Independence Party of Minnesota. The founder and chair of the Minnesota Reform Party (later renamed the Independence Party), he chaired Jesse Ventura's campaign for governor of Minnesota in 1998. Ventura subsequently appointed him director of the state's Office of Strategic and Long Range Planning. After Senator Paul Wellstone died in a plane crash just weeks before the 2002 election, Ventura appointed Barkley to fill Wellstone's Senate seat. His brief tenure ended when Republican Norm Coleman was elected and sworn in.

Barkley has run for office four times. Inspired by Ross Perot's 1992 presidential campaign, he first ran for Congress as an independent in that year's election in Minnesota's 6th congressional district. He ran three times for the U.S. Senate: in Minnesota's 1994 Senate election, in 1996, and in 2008. He received 5%, 7%, and 15% of the vote in those elections, respectively.

== Early life, education, and early career ==
Barkley was born in Annandale, Minnesota, on August 31, 1950, and graduated from Annandale High School in 1968. He earned a Bachelor of Arts from the University of Minnesota in 1972 and a Juris Doctor from the University of Minnesota Law School in 1976. During his university years, Barkley volunteered for George McGovern's 1972 presidential campaign because of his opposition to the Vietnam War.

== Career ==
After graduating from law school, he practiced law and in 1988 became president of Dayton's Furniture in Annandale, a position he held until 1991.

A founder of the Minnesota Reform Party, Barkley ran for the U.S. House in 1992, a run inspired by Ross Perot's presidential campaign, and received 16% of the vote, thanks in part to Perot voters. He was also a candidate for the U.S. Senate in 1994 and 1996.

=== Ventura administration and the United States Senate ===
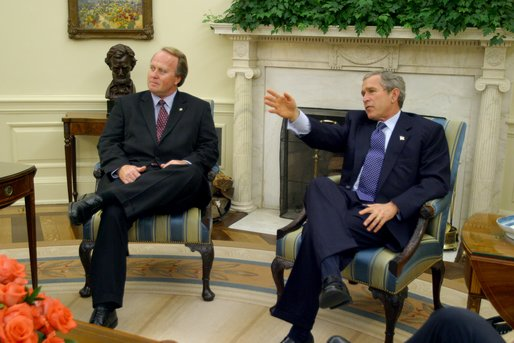
Barkley meets with president George W. Bush in 2002

Barkley was chairman of Jesse Ventura's successful gubernatorial campaign in 1998. In January 1999, Ventura appointed Barkley as director of the Office of Strategic and Long Range Planning (known as Minnesota Planning).

On November 4, 2002, Ventura appointed Barkley to complete the Senate term of Paul Wellstone, who died in a plane crash on October 25. The appointment was announced during the Senate debate between Republican Norm Coleman and Democrat Walter Mondale, who had taken Wellstone's place on the ballot; Ventura intended to upstage the debate. Barkley served until the 107th United States Congress ended on January 3, 2003, when he was replaced by Coleman, who won the election. Ventura had previously stated that he would not appoint a replacement for Wellstone, but said he changed his mind out of disgust at Wellstone's memorial service, which he felt was used as a rally for the Democratic Party, and because the major parties refused to take the third-party senatorial candidate seriously or to allow him to participate in the debates.

During his weeks as senator, Barkley helped pass legislation establishing a memorial for Wellstone and voted to clear the final passage of the Homeland Security Act.

=== After Ventura administration ===
After leaving office, Barkley did a stint in St. Paul as a state government lobbyist for a tobacco company, a casino, and the private prison industry. Beginning in April 2005, Barkley served as director and chief strategist for Texas independent Kinky Friedman's 2006 gubernatorial campaign.

In a June 2007 interview with Minnesota Monitor, Barkley confirmed that he had been approached by Democrats in Minnesota's 6th congressional district about a possible challenge to Republican Rep. Michele Bachmann. Barkley indicated he would consider running if the DFL would support him as an independent candidate.

As of May 2008 Barkley was working part-time as a bus driver for the elderly and disabled. He said he enjoyed the job and saw it as a public service.

=== 2008 U.S. Senate campaign ===
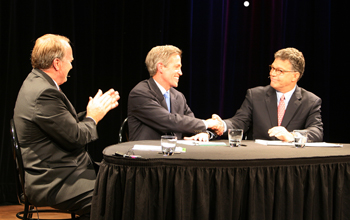
Barkley at a debate with Norm Coleman and Al Franken in 2008

Both Barkley and Ventura considered challenging Norm Coleman for reelection to the U.S. Senate seat that Barkley previously held. On July 14, 2008, Ventura announced that he would not seek the seat, prompting Barkley to announce his candidacy. Ventura supported Barkley and donated $500 to the campaign.

Despite entering the race late, Barkley was polling as high as 19% by October 1. The campaign also produced two statewide radio ads featuring Barkley and Ventura. Barkley, unlike many third-party and independent candidates, was included in public debates with the major party nominees; the first of five three-way debates took place October 5. He received the endorsement of former U.S. Representative Tim Penny. Numerous polls showed that Barkley would affect the outcome of the race. Barkley raised $163,358 for his campaign (less than 1% of each of his opponents' totals). He received over 435,000 votes, about 15% of the total, significantly affecting a race in which Franken defeated Coleman by only 312 votes.

=== 2012 Minnesota Supreme Court campaign ===
Barkley ran against Minnesota Supreme Court Associate Justice G. Barry Anderson in the 2012 election. Anderson was appointed to the court by Governor Tim Pawlenty in 2004, was elected to a six-year term in 2006, and was reelected in 2012.

== Post-political career ==
Barkley returned to law practice in Bloomington, with a general practice. He later focused on estate planning law and continues to advise unaffiliated political candidates, such as Kinky Friedman's Texas gubernatorial campaign.

== Papers ==
Dean Barkley's senatorial papers are in the library of the Minnesota Historical Society. They include biographical files, press releases and speeches, legislative files, and issue mail.

== Electoral history ==
United States Senate election in Minnesota, 2008
Party	Candidate	Votes	%
Democratic (DFL)	Al Franken	1,212,629	41.99
Republican	Norm Coleman (inc.)	1,212,317	41.98
Independence	Dean Barkley	437,505	15.15
Libertarian	Charles Aldrich	13,923	0.48
Constitution	James Niemackl	8,907	0.31
Independent	Write-ins	2,365	0.08
Total votes		2,887,646	100.00

United States Senate election in Minnesota, 1996
Party	Candidate	Votes	%
Democratic (DFL)	Paul Wellstone (inc.)	1,098,430	50.32
Republican	Rudy Boschwitz	901,194	41.28
Reform Party of Minnesota	Dean Barkley	152,328	6.98
Grassroots	Tim Davis	14,139	0.65
Libertarian	Roy Ezra Carlton	5,428	0.25
Resource	Howard Hanson	4,381	0.20
Natural Law	Steve Johnson	4,321	0.20
Socialist Workers	Thomas A. Fiske	1,554	0.07
Independent	Write-ins	1,130	0.05
Total votes		2,182,905	100.00

United States Senate election in Minnesota, 1994
Party	Candidate	Votes	%
Republican	Rod Grams	869,653	49.12
Democratic (DFL)	Ann Wynia	781,860	44.17
Independence	Dean Barkley	95,400	5.39
Independent	Candice E. Sjostrom	15,920	0.90
Natural Law	Stephen Johnson	5,054	0.29
Socialist Workers	Marea Himelgrin	2,428	0.14
Total votes		1,770,315	100.00

U.S. House of Representatives election, 1992 Minnesota's 6th congressional district
Party	Candidate	Votes	%
Republican	Rod Grams	133,564	44.37
Democratic (DFL)	Gerry Sikorski	100,016	33.23
Independence	Dean Barkley	48,329	16.05
Independent	James H. Peterson	16,411	5.45
Natural Law	Tom Firnstahl	2,400	0.80
Independent	Write-ins	303	0.10
Total votes		301,023	100.00

Party political offices
New political party	Independence nominee for U.S. Senator from Minnesota (Class 1); 1994	Succeeded by James Gibson
New political party	Independence nominee for U.S. Senator from Minnesota (Class 2); 1996	Succeeded by Jim Moore
Preceded by Jim Moore	Independence nominee for U.S. Senator from Minnesota (Class 2); 2008	Succeeded by Steve Carlson
U.S. Senate
Preceded by Paul Wellstone	U.S. Senator (Class 2) from Minnesota; 2002–2003; Served alongside: Mark Dayton	Succeeded by Norm Coleman
U.S. order of precedence (ceremonial)
Preceded by Laphonza Butler as Former U.S. Senator	Order of precedence of the United States	Succeeded by Sheila Frahm as Former U.S. Senator
