= 1978 United States Senate election in Minnesota =

- November 7, 1978
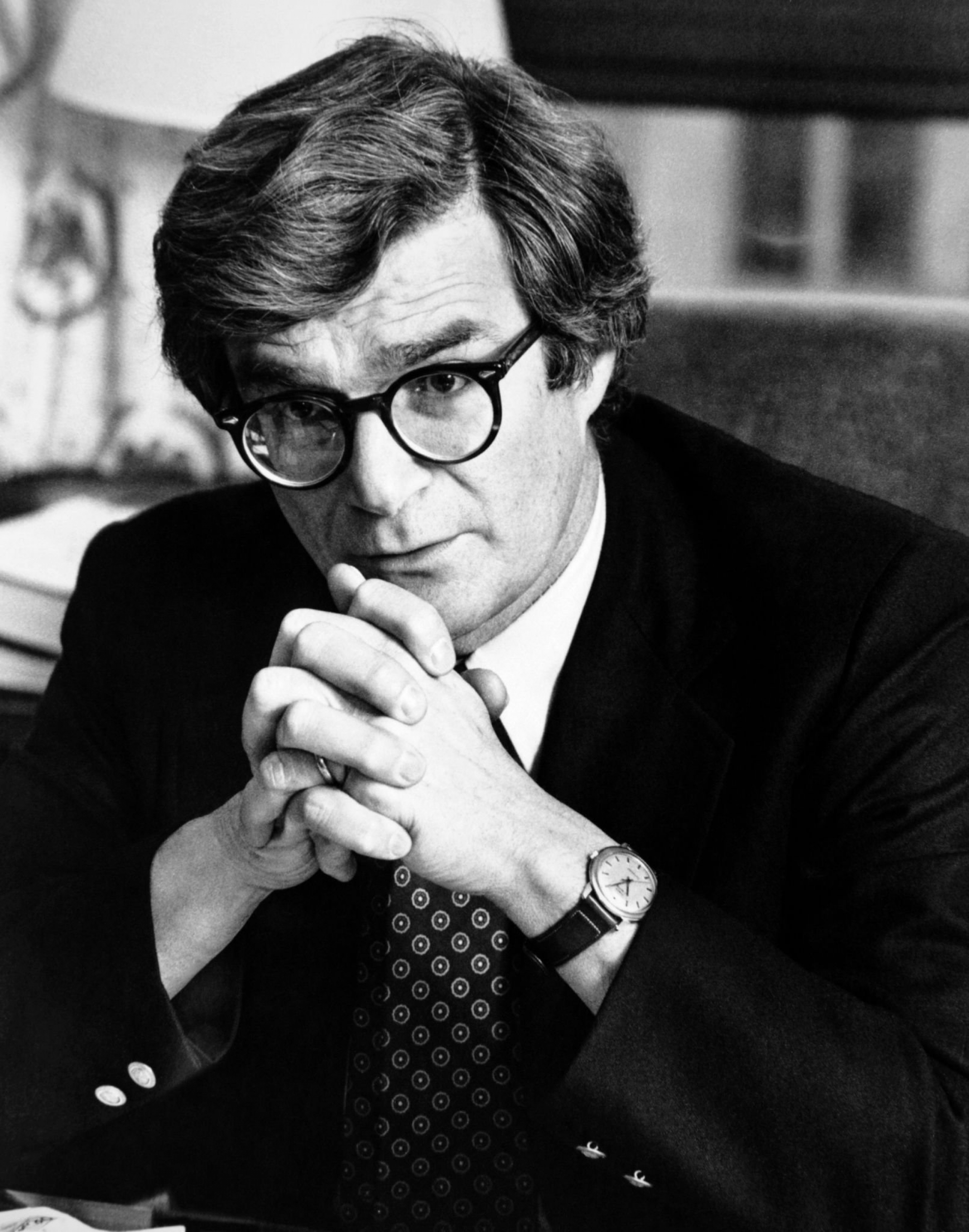

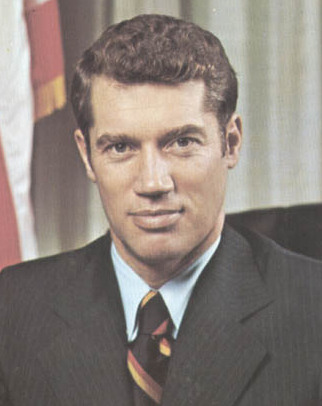
Nominee	Rudy Boschwitz	Wendell Anderson
Party	Ind.-Republican	Democratic (DFL)
Popular vote	894,092	638,375
Percentage	56.57%	40.39%
- County results Boschwitz: 40–50% 50–60% 60–70% 70–80% Anderson: 40–50%
U.S. senator before election
Wendell Anderson
Democratic (DFL)
Elected U.S. Senator
Rudy Boschwitz
Ind.-Republican

The 1978 United States Senate election in Minnesota was held on November 7, 1978. Incumbent Democratic U.S. Senator Wendell Anderson was defeated by Republican challenger Rudy Boschwitz. Boschwitz's landslide victory over Anderson was part of a Republican sweep of the top of the ticket in the state's elections for both U.S. Senate seats and the race for Governor which has been dubbed the "Minnesota Massacre".

== Background ==
In 1976, U.S. Senator Walter Mondale was elected Vice President of the United States as the running mate of Georgia governor Jimmy Carter and resigned from his current term, which was set to expire in 1979. To fill the vacancy created by Mondale's resignation, Governor Wendell Anderson resigned from office himself and was succeeded by Lieutenant Governor Rudy Perpich, who appointed Anderson to complete the remainder of Mondale's term in office.

In January 1978, Minnesota's other Senator, former Vice President Hubert H. Humphrey, died in office. Rudy Perpich appointed his widow, Muriel Humphrey, to complete his turn in office. Thus, the incumbent Governor and both Senators were all members of the Democratic-Farmer-Labor Party, and none had been elected to their current office. (Republicans took advantage of this, putting up billboards that read, "The DFL is going to face something scary — an election".)

== Democratic–Farmer–Labor primary ==
=== Candidates ===
- Daryl W. Anderson
- Wendell Anderson, Incumbent U.S. Senator since 1976
- Dick Bullock
- John S. Connolly, lawyer
- Emil L. Moses
- Lloyd M. Roberts

=== Results ===
Democratic primary election results
Party	Candidate	Votes	%
Democratic (DFL)	Wendell Anderson (incumbent)	286,209	56.9%
Democratic (DFL)	John S. Connolly	159,974	31.8%
Democratic (DFL)	Daryl W. Anderson	23,159	4.6%
Democratic (DFL)	Lloyd M. Roberts	12,709	2.5%
Democratic (DFL)	Dick Bullock	11,485	2.3%
Democratic (DFL)	Emil L. Moses	9,580	1.9%
Total votes		503,116	100.0%

== Independent-Republican primary ==
=== Candidates ===
- Rudy Boschwitz, businessman
- Harold Stassen, former Governor of Minnesota (1939-1943)

=== Results ===
Republican primary election results
Party	Candidate	Votes	%
Ind.-Republican	Rudy Boschwitz	185,393	86.8%
Ind.-Republican	Harold Stassen	28,170	13.2%
Total votes		213,563	100.0%

== American Party primary ==
=== Candidates ===
- Sal Carlone

=== Results ===
American Party primary election results
Party	Candidate	Votes	%
American	Sal Carlone	4,085	100.0%
Total votes		4,085	100.0%

== General election ==
=== Results ===
The results in Minnesota marked the first time the Republicans had held all three offices since Joseph H. Ball left the Senate in January 1949 after being defeated for re-election. Additionally, this election and the special election both marked the first time since 1958 that both Senate seats in a state flipped from one party to the other in a single election cycle.

General election results
Party	Candidate	Votes	%
Ind.-Republican	Rudy Boschwitz	894,092	56.57%
Democratic (DFL)	Wendell Anderson (incumbent)	638,375	40.39%
American	Sal Carlone	23,261	1.47%
Socialist Workers	William Peterson	9,856	0.62%
Independent	Brian J. Coyle	8,083	0.51%
Workers League	Jean T. Brust	3,891	0.25%
Libertarian	Leonard J. Richards	2,992	0.19%
Others	Write-ins	72	0.01%
Total votes		1,580,622	100.00%
Majority		255,717	16.18%
Turnout		1,580,622	62.95%
Ind.-Republican gain from Democratic (DFL)			

== See also ==
- 1978 United States Senate elections
