= Tim Walz =

Governor of Minnesota since 2019

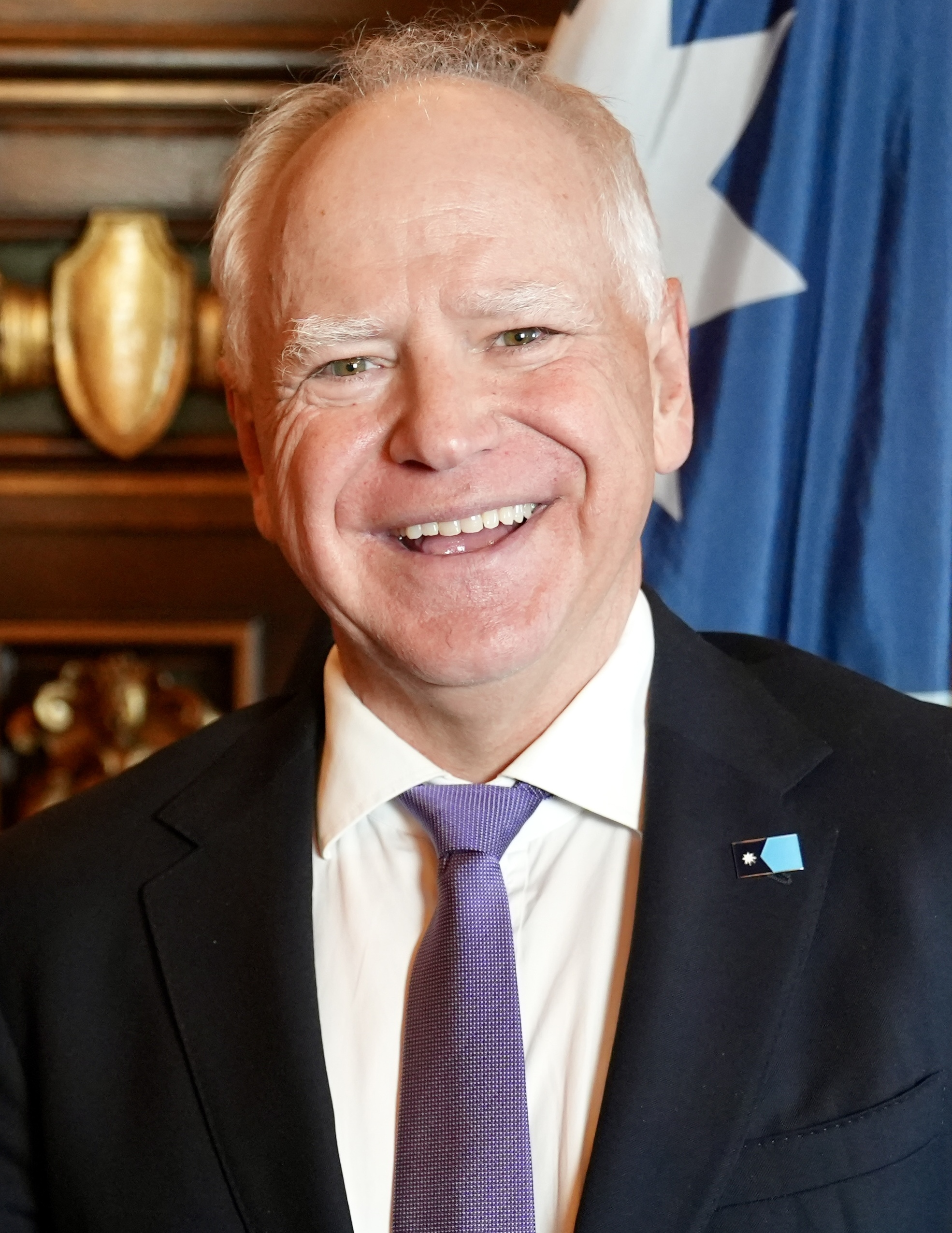
- Walz in 2026

41st Governor of Minnesota
- Incumbent
- Assumed office January 7, 2019
- Lieutenant: Peggy Flanagan
- Preceded by: Mark Dayton

Ranking Member of the House Veterans' Affairs Committee
- In office January 3, 2017 – January 3, 2019
- Preceded by: Mark Takano (acting)
- Succeeded by: Phil Roe

Member of the U.S. House of Representatives from Minnesota's 1st district
- In office January 3, 2007 – January 3, 2019
- Preceded by: Gil Gutknecht
- Succeeded by: Jim Hagedorn

Personal details
- Born: Timothy James Walz; April 6, 1964 (age 62) West Point, Nebraska, U.S.
- Party: Democratic (DFL)
- Spouse: Gwen Whipple (m. 1994)
- Children: 2
- Relatives: Lynne Walz (cousin)
- Education: University of Houston (attended); Chadron State College (BS); Minnesota State University, Mankato (MS); Saint Mary's University of Minnesota (attended)
- Website: Campaign website

Military service
- Branch/service: United States Army; Nebraska National Guard; Minnesota National Guard
- Years of service: 1981–2005
- Rank: Master Sergeant (retired as); Command Sergeant Major (highest held)
- Unit: 1st Battalion, 125th Field Artillery Regiment
- Battles/wars: Operation Enduring Freedom
- Awards: Army Commendation Medal; Army Achievement Medal (2); National Defense Service Medal (2); Global War on Terrorism Service Medal
- Walz's voice Walz opposing the Tax Cuts and Jobs Act. Recorded November 15, 2017

Timothy James Walz (Note: /wɔːlz/) (born April 6, 1964) is an American politician, former educator, and Army National Guard veteran serving since 2019 as the 41st governor of Minnesota. From 2007 to 2019, he was a member of the U.S. House of Representatives, representing Minnesota's 1st congressional district. Walz is a member of the Minnesota Democratic–Farmer–Labor Party (DFL), which affiliates with the national Democratic Party, and was the party's vice presidential nominee in the 2024 presidential election.

Walz was born in West Point, Nebraska, and grew up in Valentine, Nebraska. After graduating from Butte High School in 1982, he joined the Army National Guard and worked in a factory. He later graduated from Chadron State College in Nebraska before moving to Minnesota in 1996, where he attended Minnesota State University, Mankato and Saint Mary's University of Minnesota. Before running for Congress, he was a high school social studies teacher and football coach. He was first elected to the House in 2006, defeating six-term Republican incumbent Gil Gutknecht. Walz was reelected to the House five times and was the ranking member of the House Veterans Affairs Committee from 2017 to 2019.

Walz was elected governor of Minnesota in 2018 and reelected in 2022. During his first term, he presided over the state response to protests and riots related to the murder of George Floyd, as well as the COVID-19 pandemic. During his second term, he pushed for and signed a wide range of progressive legislation during the two-year period Democrats held a governing trifecta, including voting rights restoration for felons, driver's licenses for illegal immigrants, establishing Minnesota as a trans refuge, legalization of cannabis, tax modifications, free school meals, free feminine hygiene products in schools, universal gun background checks, codifying abortion rights, and free college tuition for low-income families.

On August 6, 2024, Vice President Kamala Harris announced Walz as her running mate in that year's presidential election. Their ticket was defeated by the Republican ticket of Donald Trump and JD Vance. Walz initially sought a third term as governor in 2026, but withdrew his candidacy after investigations revealed extensive fraud in state-funded social services. This raised criticism over failures in administrative oversight, prompting judicial authorities to conduct a review. On January 28, 2026, Walz said that after completing his term as governor, he would "never run for an elected office again". On April 20, 2026, Walz established "Small Town PAC".

== Early life and education ==
Timothy James Walz was born on April 6, 1964, in West Point, Nebraska, at Memorial Hospital. His mother, Darlene Rose Reiman, was a homemaker and grew up on a farm. His father, James Frederick Walz, was a teacher and school superintendent who served in the U.S. Army during the Korean War, and had worked in the family's butcher shop as a child. Walz is of German, Swedish, Luxembourgish, and Irish descent; in 1867 his great-great-grandfather Sebastian Walz emigrated to the United States from Kuppenheim, Germany. One of his grandmothers was Swedish American, and one of his great-grandmothers was Irish American. He was raised Catholic.

Walz and his three siblings grew up in Valentine, Nebraska, a small rural town in the north-central part of the state, in an area of farms and ranchland near the South Dakota border. In school, he played football and basketball and ran track. After school, he went hunting with his friends. While Walz was in high school, his father, who was the school superintendent and a chain smoker, was diagnosed with lung cancer. After his father's diagnosis, his family moved to the rural farming community of Butte, Nebraska to be closer to his mother's relatives. During summers, Walz worked on the family farm. He graduated from Butte High School in 1982 in a class of 25 students and then went to Chadron, Nebraska for college.

Walz's father died in January 1984, leaving his mother and younger brother dependent on Social Security survivor benefits for support. He was devastated and drifted from Nebraska to Texas, where he took courses at the University of Houston in East Asian studies and served in the Texas Army National Guard. Then he went to Jonesboro, in northeast Arkansas, where he built tanning beds in a factory and was an instructor in the Arkansas Army National Guard.

Walz returned to Nebraska in 1987 to continue his education at Chadron State College; he participated in student government there and was an honor student. He graduated in 1989 with a Bachelor of Science degree in social science education. Walz received his master's degree from Minnesota State University, Mankato. In 2001, he wrote his master's thesis, "Improving Human Rights and Genocide Studies in the American High School Classroom", which focused on Holocaust and genocide education. He began a Doctor of Education at Saint Mary's University of Minnesota, but did not complete it.

== Early career ==
=== Teaching ===
After graduating from Chadron State College, Walz accepted a one-year teaching position with WorldTeach at Foshan No.1 High School in Guangdong, China. He went to teach in August 1989, following the Tiananmen Square protests and subsequent government crackdown in June of that year. Upon returning to the U.S., Walz became a teacher and coach in Alliance, a town of 10,000 in western Nebraska, and in 1993 was named an Outstanding Young Nebraskan by the Nebraska Junior Chamber of Commerce.

While working as a teacher, Walz met his wife, Gwen Whipple, a fellow teacher, and in 1994 the two married. Two years later, they moved to Mankato, Minnesota, in Gwen's home state. Walz worked as a geography teacher and football coach at Mankato West High School. The football team had lost 27 straight games when he joined the coaching staff as a defensive coordinator. Three years later, in 1999, the team won its first state championship.

In 1999, Walz agreed to be the faculty advisor of Mankato West High School's first gay–straight alliance. He felt it was important that as a married, heterosexual football coach and soldier, he could show how different worlds can coexist. For nine years he and his wife ran Educational Travel Adventures, which organized summer educational trips to China for high-school students. Walz earned a master of science in experiential education from Minnesota State University, Mankato, in 2002, writing his master's thesis on Holocaust education. In March 2006, he took a leave of absence from teaching to run for Congress.

=== Military service ===
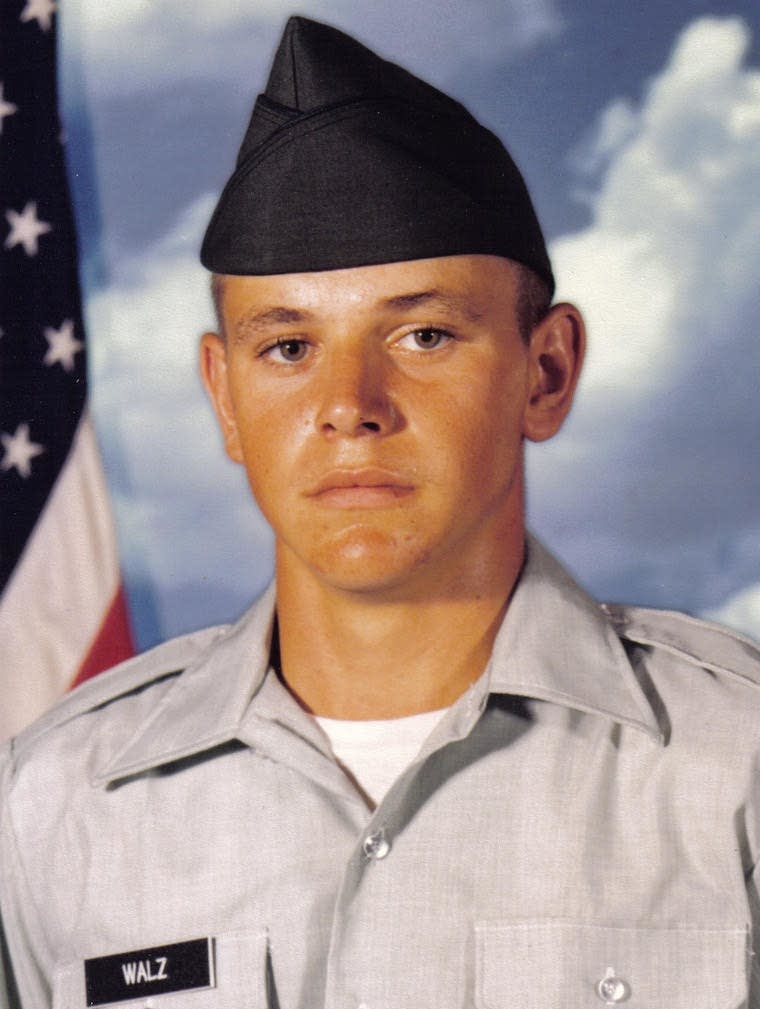
Walz during Army Basic Training at Fort Benning, Georgia, 1981

With his father's encouragement, Walz enlisted in the Army National Guard two days after he turned 17. His father had served during the Korean War and earned his education degree with the G.I. Bill; he wanted his son to have the same opportunity.

Walz served in the National Guard for 24 years after enlisting in 1981. During his military career, he was posted in Arkansas, Texas, near the Arctic Circle in Norway; New Ulm, Minnesota, northwest of Mankato; Italy, and elsewhere. He trained in heavy artillery. During his service, he worked in disaster response postings following floods and tornadoes and was deployed overseas. In 1989, he earned the title of Nebraska Citizen-Soldier of the Year.

After Walz completed the 20 years of service needed to retire from the Guard, he reenlisted instead of retiring, later citing the September 11 attacks as the reason for his reenlistment. He was able to retire in August 2002. In August 2003, he deployed with the Minnesota National Guard to Vicenza, Italy, for nine months, to serve with the European Security Force as part of Operation Enduring Freedom.

Walz attained the rank of command sergeant major near the end of his service and briefly was the senior enlisted soldier of 1st Battalion, 125th Field Artillery Regiment. His decorations include the Army Commendation Medal, two Army Achievement Medals, two National Defense Service Medals, a Global War on Terrorism Service Medal, and an Army Reserve Components Achievement Medal with five oak leaf clusters.

On February 10, 2005, Walz filed official documents to run for the U.S. House of Representatives. In March, the National Guard announced a possible deployment of around 2,000 soldiers from across the Minnesota National Guard to Iraq sometime in the next two years. Walz said he would deploy if called upon. The National Guard finished processing his retirement paperwork in May, and Walz retired from military service on May 16. He later explained that he retired in order to focus on his campaign for Congress and did not want to violate the Hatch Act, which forbids some political activities by federal government employees. The Minnesota National Guard confirmed that Walz retired two months before his former unit was notified on July 14 of its potential deployment to Iraq. That unit received its mobilization order in August and deployed to Iraq in March 2006, ten months after Walz retired.

During his political career, Republicans, notably Donald Trump Jr., Charlie Kirk, and JD Vance, questioned the timing of Walz's military retirement. A National Guard colleague, Joe Eustice, recalled that at the time Walz retired, his unit's deployment was only a "rumor" and not yet confirmed. His enlisted superior, Doug Julin, said that Walz bypassed his retirement approval, instead receiving retirement approval from two higher-ranked officers.

Though he was serving as a command sergeant major at the time of his retirement, Walz's final military rank for retirement benefit purposes is master sergeant, as he had not completed the required academic coursework to remain a command sergeant major before his retirement. The National Guard processed the adjustment of his rank in September 2005, but the effective date was made retroactive to the day before his military retirement in May 2005. A public affairs officer for the Minnesota National Guard in 2018 said it was "legitimate for Walz to say he served as a command sergeant major". A reference to Walz on his official campaign website as a "retired command sergeant major" was later updated to read that he "once served at the command sergeant major rank".

Walz did not deploy to an active combat zone during his service. At a meeting about reducing gun violence in 2018, he argued for some kinds of reform, saying, "We can make sure that those weapons of war that I carried in war is the only place where those weapons are at." The use of the phrase "in war" on this one occasion was criticized by Vance. The Harris campaign responded that Walz "misspoke".

=== Political involvement ===
Walz became first active in politics in August 2004, when he volunteered for John Kerry's presidential campaign. He was inspired to volunteer in the presidential election after he took a group of students to a George W. Bush rally in Mankato, and was angered by the security team's questioning of his students' politics after they saw a Kerry sticker on a student's wallet. He was appointed the Kerry campaign's coordinator for his county, as well as a district coordinator of Vets for Kerry. In January 2005, Walz completed the three-day campaigns and elections crash course at Camp Wellstone, a program run by Wellstone Action, the nonprofit organization Mark and David Wellstone created to carry on the work of their parents, Paul and Sheila Wellstone.

== U.S. House of Representatives (2007–2019) ==
=== Elections ===
On February 10, 2005, Walz filed to run for the U.S. House of Representatives from Minnesota's 1st congressional district. The district consisted mostly of Republican-leaning independents. He had no opponent for the Minnesota Democratic–Farmer–Labor Party (DFL) nomination in the 2006 primary election. In the general election, he faced Republican Gil Gutknecht, a six-term incumbent. During the campaign, Walz accused Gutknecht of extending tax cuts to "Wall Street" and sought to tie Gutknecht to President George W. Bush.

A centerpiece of Walz's campaign was opposition to the Iraq War, as the war's popularity was declining that year. Walz won the election with 53% of the vote. After his victory, Politico said Gutknecht had been caught "off guard" and Walz had "resolved never to get caught like that himself.... He packaged himself as a moderate from Day One, built an office centered on constituent service and carved out a niche as a tireless advocate for veterans."

Walz was reelected in 2008 with 63% of the vote, becoming only the second non-Republican to win a second full term in the district. He won a third term in 2010 with 49% of the vote in a three-way race against Republican state representative Randy Demmer and independent former diplomat Steve Wilson. He was reelected by comfortable margins in 2012 and 2014. In 2016, Walz was narrowly reelected to a sixth term, defeating Republican Jim Hagedorn by 0.7% (or 2,548 votes), even as his district overwhelmingly voted for Donald Trump in the concurrent presidential election. Walz did not seek a seventh term in 2018, instead running for governor.

=== Congressional tenure ===
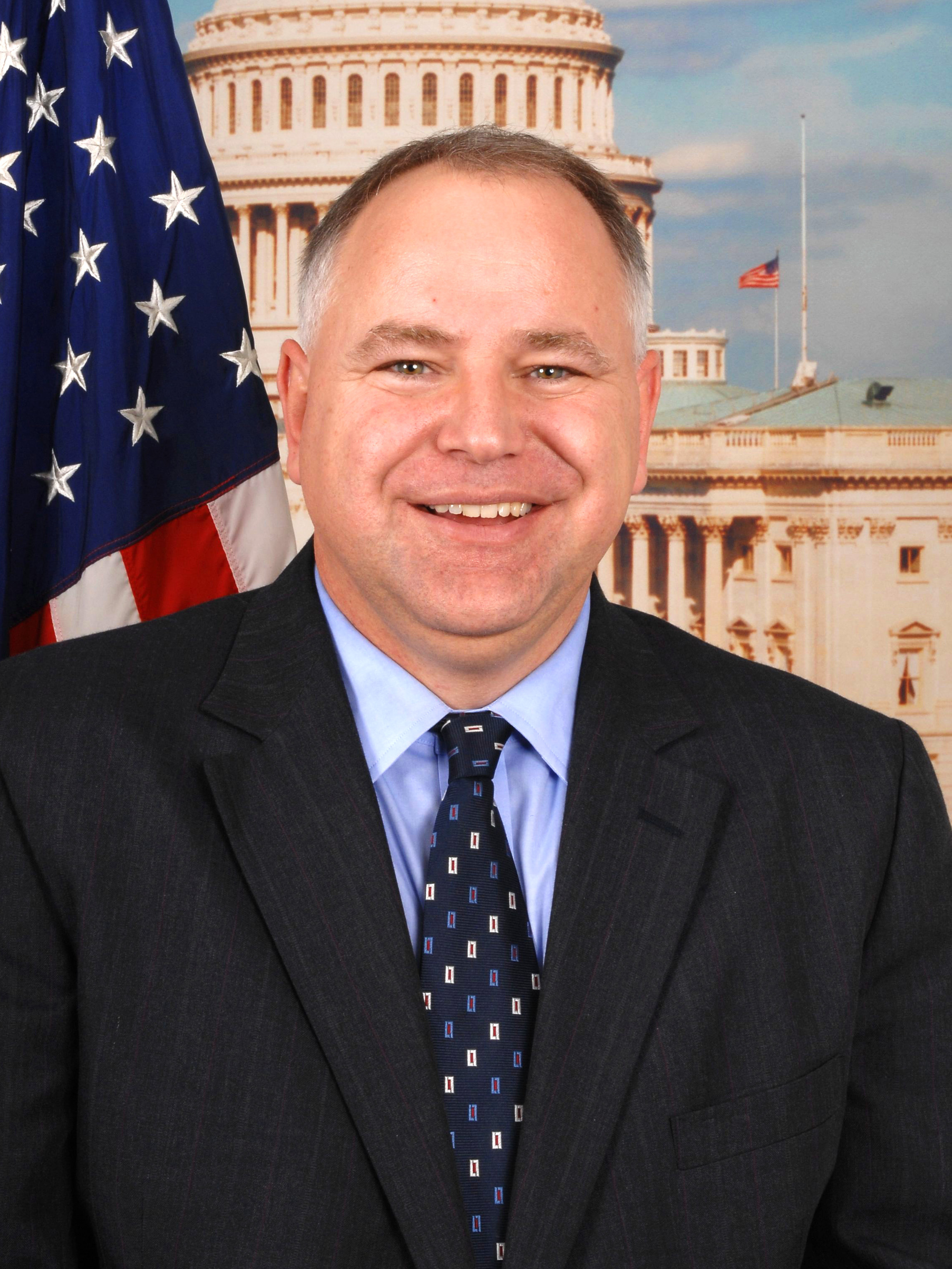
Walz's 110th Congress portrait, 2006

Swearing in at the beginning of the 110th Congress, Walz became the highest-ranking retired enlisted soldier ever to serve in Congress, as well as only the fourth Democrat/DFLer to represent his district. The others were Thomas Wilson (1887–1889), William Harries (1891–1893), and Tim Penny (1983–1995). Even as he represented a district that had usually voted Republican, pundits described Walz's policy positions as ranging from moderate to progressive.

In his first month in Congress, Walz was appointed to the Committee on Veterans' Affairs, the Agriculture Committee, and the Transportation and Infrastructure Committee; Speaker Nancy Pelosi issued a special waiver exempting him from the order that barred most freshman members of Congress from serving on more than two committees. That same year, he was appointed to the Armed Services Committee. In his first week as a legislator, Walz cosponsored a bill to raise the minimum wage, voted for stem cell research, voted to allow Medicare to negotiate pharmaceutical prices, and voiced support for pay-as-you-go budget rules, requiring that new spending or tax changes not add to the federal deficit.

An opponent of the Iraq war, Walz opposed the Bush administration's plan to send an additional 21,500 troops to Iraq in 2007. But he voted in favor of a bill in May of that year that provided nearly $95 billion in funding for the war through September 30. Walz explained that his vote was to ensure the safety of American troops while also saying he would continue to negotiate a process to pull troops from Iraq. He reiterated his support for ending the war in October and called on those who opposed the war to "have their voice be heard".

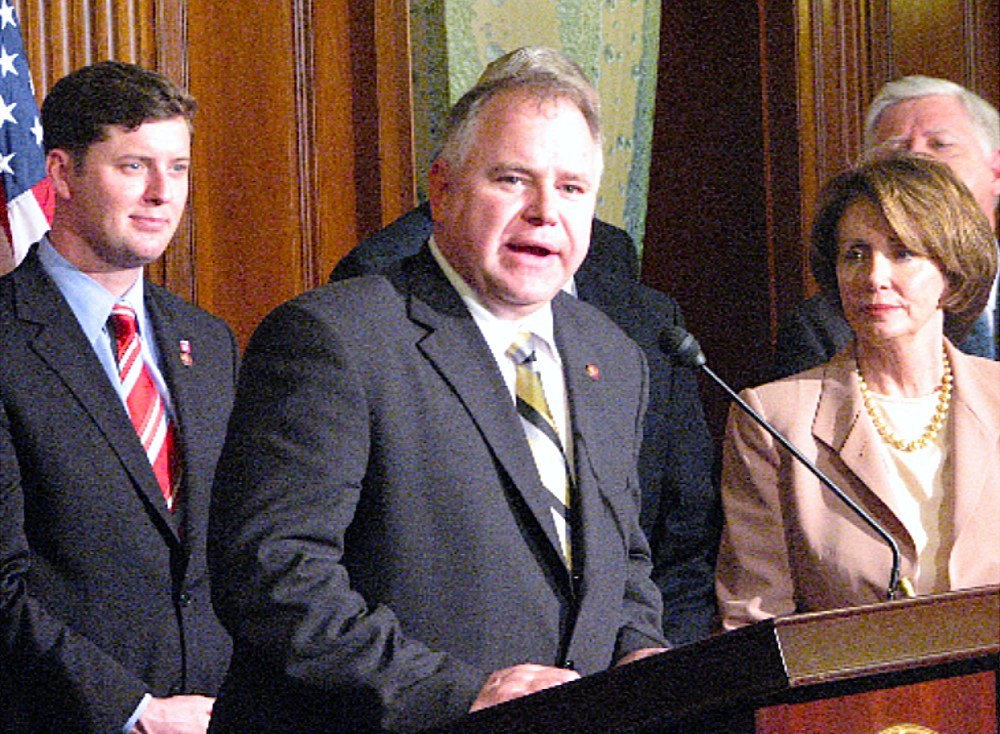
Walz, with Speaker Pelosi and Rep. Patrick Murphy, speaking about a spending bill, 2007

During the 2008 financial crisis, Walz repeatedly spoke out against using taxpayer money to bail out financial institutions; in late September, he voted against the $700 billion Troubled Asset Relief Program bill, which purchased troubled assets from these institutions. Walz released a statement after the bill's passage, saying: "The bill we voted on today passes the buck when it comes to recouping the losses taxpayers might suffer. I also regret that this bill does not do enough to help average homeowners, or provide sufficient oversight of Wall Street."

In December 2008, Walz voted against the bill that offered $14 billion in government loans to bail out the country's large automobile manufacturers. In June 2009, he introduced a bipartisan resolution calling on the federal government to "relinquish its temporary ownership interests in the General Motors Company and the Chrysler Group, LLC, as soon as possible" and said that the government must not be involved in those companies' management decisions.

Walz voted for the American Recovery and Reinvestment Act of 2009. As a member of the House Transportation Committee, he saw the bill as an opportunity to work "with his congressional colleagues to make job creation through investment in public infrastructure like roads, bridges and clean energy the cornerstone of the economic recovery plan". Walz focused heavily on job and economic issues important to the southern Minnesota district he represented in Congress, which has a mix of larger employers such as the Mayo Clinic and small businesses and agricultural interests. In July 2009, he voted for the Enhancing Small Business Research and Innovation Act, which he called "part of our long-term economic blueprint to spur job creation by encouraging America's entrepreneurs to innovate toward breakthrough technological advancements".

In 2008 and 2009, Walz urged assistance for hog and dairy farmers who struggled with lower prices for their commodities. Voting for the American Recovery and Reinvestment Act, he pointed to its strong provisions in support of public school buildings. He is on record supporting legislation to lower tuition costs. In a February 2009 speech, he said that the most important thing to do "to ensure a solid base for [America's] economic future ... is to provide the best education possible for [American] children." Walz has received strong backing for these policies from many interest groups, including the National Education Association, the American Association of University Women, and the National Association of Elementary School Principals.

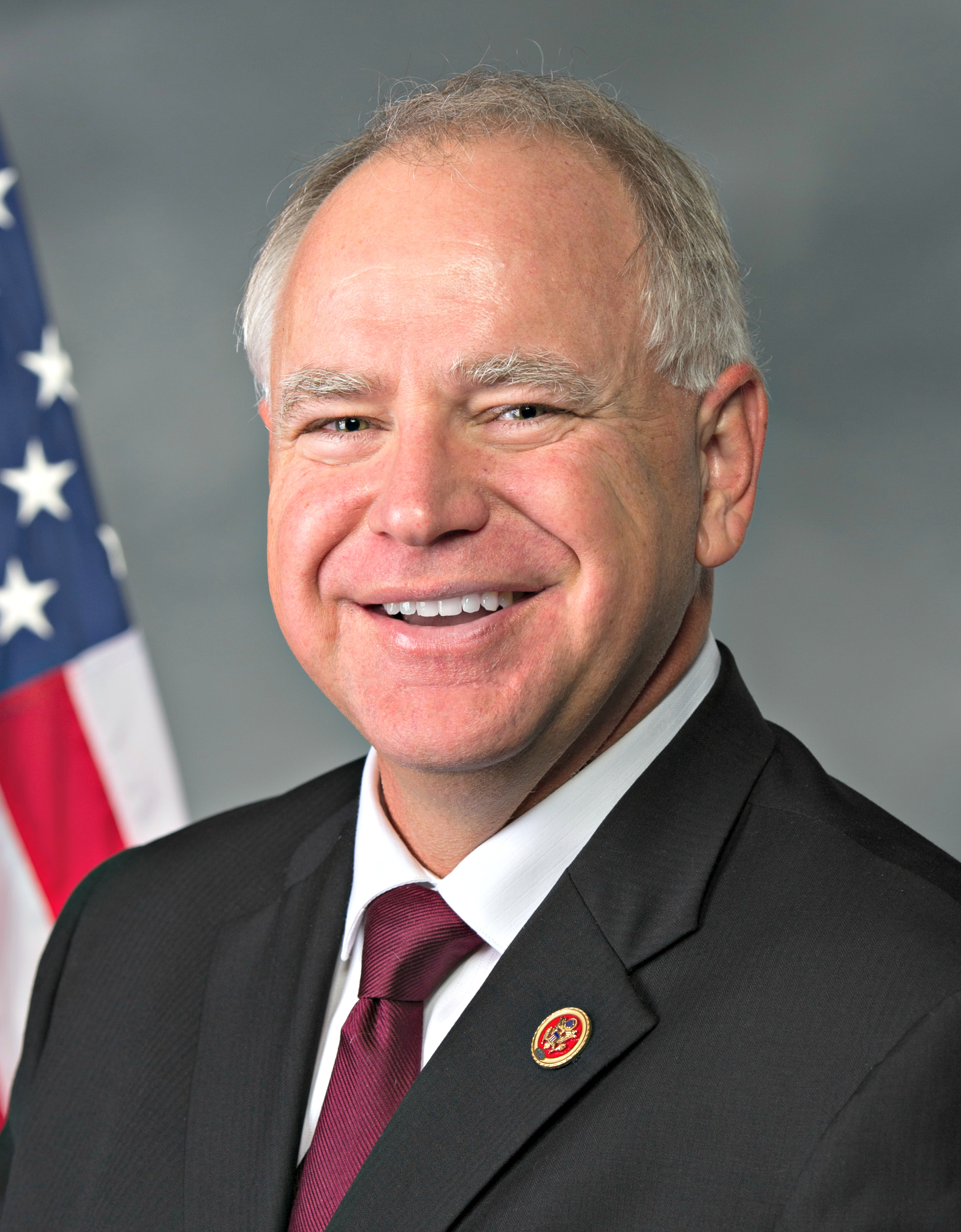
Walz's 113th Congress portrait, 2013

In February 2008, Walz endorsed the candidacy of Barack Obama in the 2008 Democratic Party presidential primaries. During the Obama administration, he voted to advance the Affordable Care Act out of the House. Walz was a significant supporter of the STOCK Act, which bans congressional insider trading. Obama signed it into law in April 2012. Walz also met with the Dalai Lama and served on a commission monitoring human rights in China.

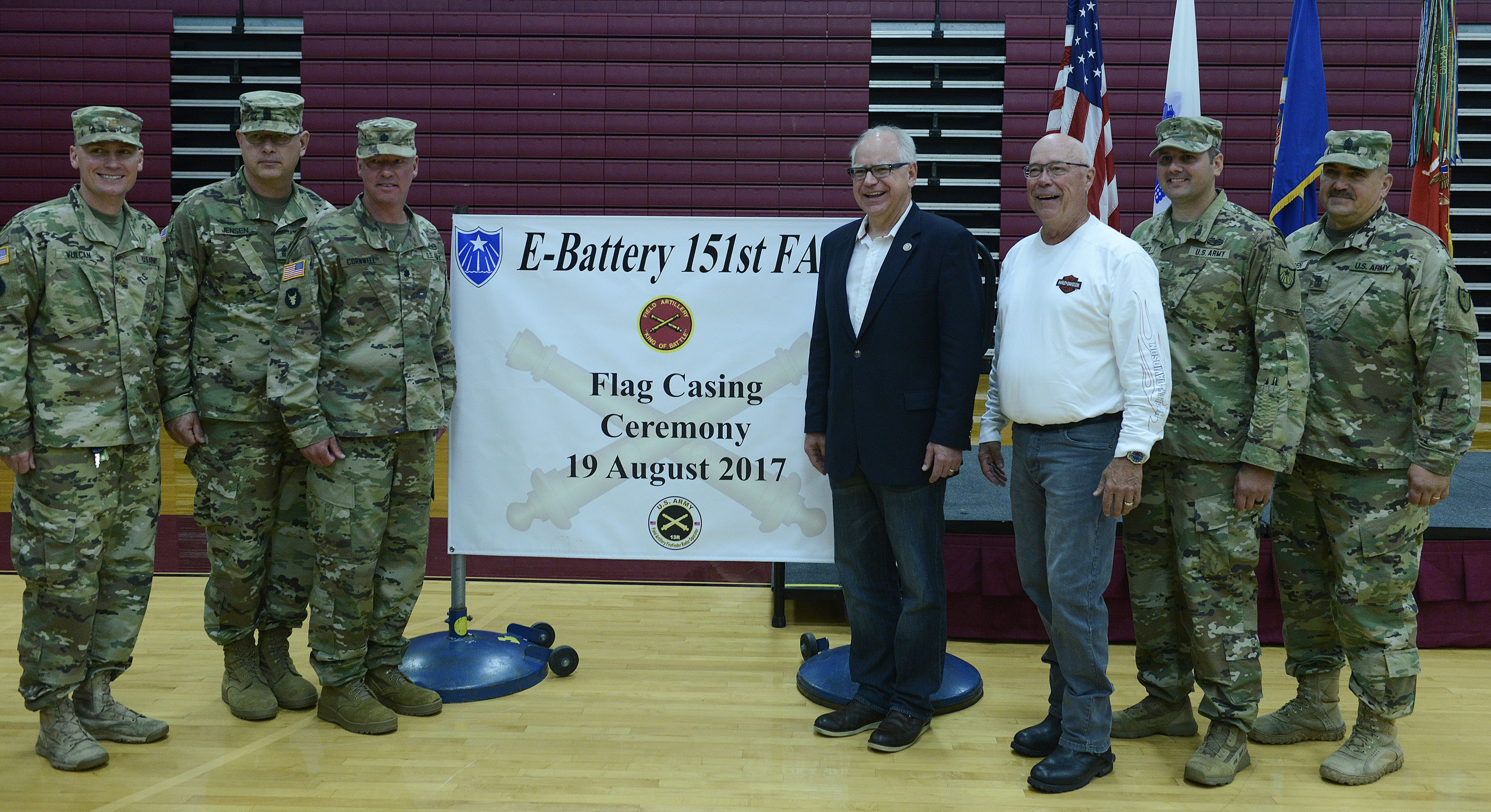
Walz with members of the Minnesota National Guard at Anoka High School, 2017

During the 2013 federal government shutdown, Walz chose not to accept his congressional salary, instead donating it to hunger-relief organizations. He accused the political Tea Party movement of contributing to the shutdown, calling it "reckless" and "completely avoidable". "No one should be patting themselves on the back about doing the basic work of government", Walz said. In 2016, he voted to condemn UN Security Council Resolution 2334, which called the building of Israeli settlements in the occupied Palestinian territories a violation of international law.

Walz was ranked the 7th-most bipartisan House member during the 114th Congress (and the most bipartisan member from Minnesota) in the Bipartisan Index created by the Lugar Center and the McCourt School of Public Policy, which ranks members of Congress by measuring how often their bills attract co-sponsors from the opposite party and how often they co-sponsor bills by members of the opposite party. In early 2015, he endorsed the candidacy of Hillary Clinton in the 2016 Democratic Party presidential primaries.

In 2017, Walz was floated as a possible candidate for the 2018 special election for the U.S. Senate seat held by Al Franken, even though Walz had already announced his campaign for governor. He declined to run and endorsed Lieutenant Governor Tina Smith after she launched her campaign for the seat.

=== Committee assignments ===
- Committee on Agriculture
  - Agriculture Subcommittee on Forestry
  - Agriculture Subcommittee on Commodity Markets, Digital Assets, and Rural Development
- Committee on Veterans' Affairs (ranking member, 115th Congress)
  - Subcommittee on Disability Assistance and Memorial Affairs
  - Subcommittee on Economic Opportunity
- Committee on Transportation and Infrastructure
- Armed Services Committee

=== Caucus memberships ===
- Chair, Congressional EMS Caucus
- Co-chair, National Guard and Reserve Component Caucus
- Co-chair, Congressional Sportsmen's Caucus
- Co-chair, Congressional Veterans Jobs Caucus
- Member, LGBT Equality Caucus
- Member, Congressional Arts Caucus

=== Commissions ===
- Congressional-Executive Commission on China

== Governor of Minnesota (2019–present) ==
=== Elections ===
==== 2018 ====
Walz campaigning in Bemidji, Minnesota, 2018

In March 2017, after Mark Dayton, the incumbent governor, chose not to seek another term, Walz announced he would run for governor. His main opponent in the Democratic primary was originally state representative Erin Murphy, who won the state party endorsement at the party's convention in June 2018. Shortly thereafter, state attorney general Lori Swanson entered the race late in the campaign. Walz defeated Murphy and Swanson in the August primary election with a 41.60% plurality. On November 6, 2018, he was elected governor, defeating the Republican nominee, Hennepin County commissioner Jeff Johnson, 53.84% to 42.43%.

==== 2022 ====
Walz sought reelection in 2022. He won the August 9 Democratic primary and faced Republican nominee Scott Jensen in the November general election. On November 8, 2022, Walz defeated Jensen, 52.3% to 44.6%.

==== 2026 ====
In a June 2025 Minnesota Star Tribune poll, 45% responded that Walz should seek reelection, while 49% believed otherwise. On September 16, 2025, Walz announced his candidacy for a third term as governor, but on January 5, 2026, he withdrew from the race.

=== Tenure ===
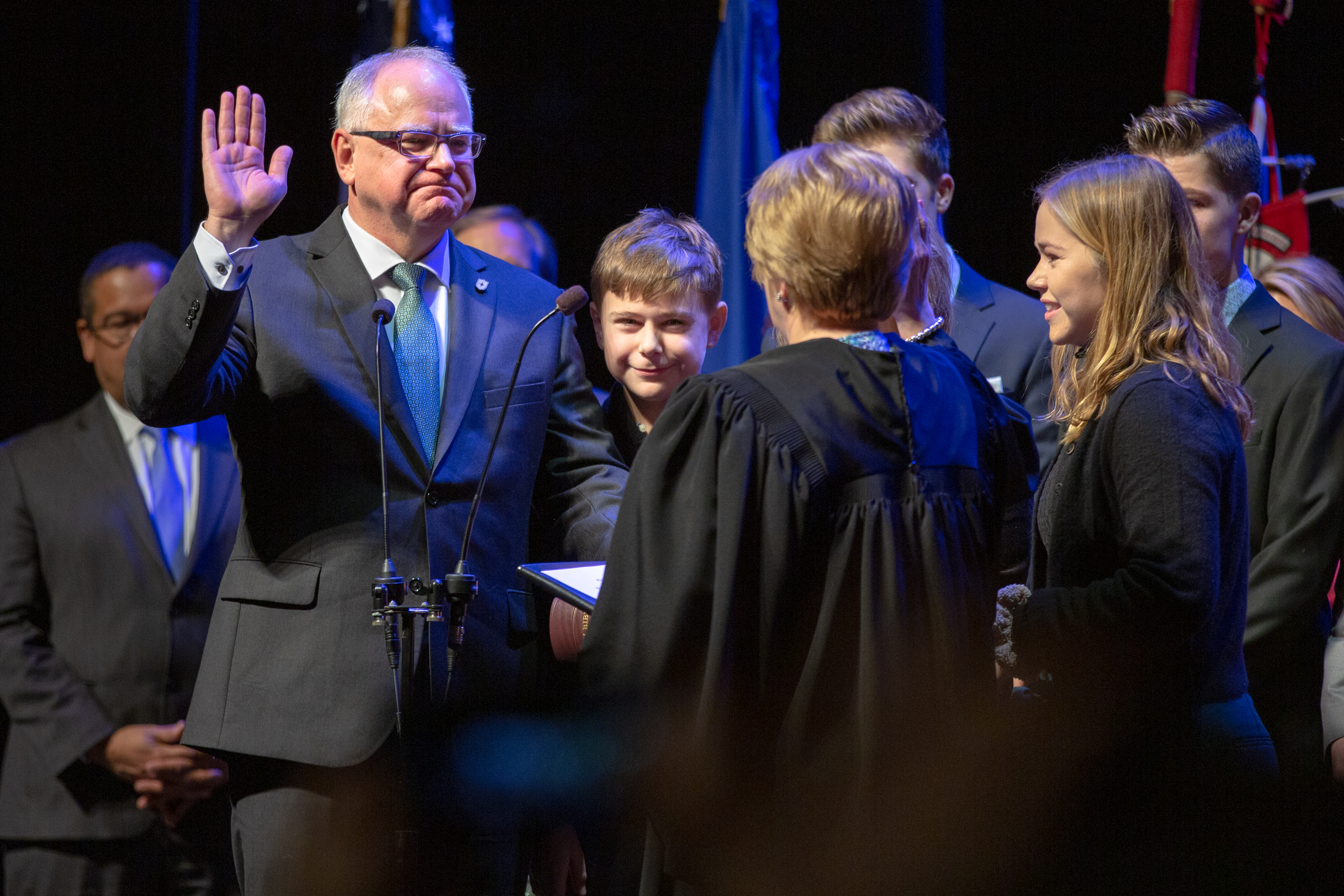
Walz's swearing-in as Minnesota's 41st governor with his family by his side, 2019

Walz was sworn in as governor of Minnesota on January 7, 2019, at the Fitzgerald Theater in Saint Paul. He took the oath of office alongside the incoming lieutenant governor, Peggy Flanagan; Minnesota secretary of state Steve Simon; Minnesota state auditor Julie Blaha; and Minnesota attorney general Keith Ellison, all Democrats. Walz spoke about education and healthcare reform in his inauguration speech.

Later in 2019, President Donald Trump appointed Walz to the bipartisan Council of Governors; in 2021 President Joe Biden appointed Walz as a co-chairman of the Council of Governors. In 2023, Walz was named chair of the Democratic Governors Association, a high-profile position that involves supporting other governors in tight races. He stepped down after being selected as Kamala Harris's running mate. Kansas governor Laura Kelly succeeded him as chair.

==== Police reform and protest response ====
On May 26, 2020, the day after the murder of George Floyd, Walz and Lieutenant Governor Peggy Flanagan demanded justice and called the video of Minneapolis police officer Derek Chauvin kneeling on George Floyd's neck "disturbing". Walz elaborated, "The lack of humanity in this disturbing video is sickening. We will get answers and seek justice".

In response to riots in Minnesota, Walz partially activated the Minnesota National Guard on May 28, and fully activated it on May 30. President Trump reacted to Walz's actions by saying that he was "very happy" and that he did "fully agree with the way [Walz] handled it ... what [the Minnesota National Guard] did in Minneapolis was incredible". Trump called Walz an "excellent guy". Trump also publicly claimed credit for deploying the Minnesota National Guard; Walz's office said Trump had no impact on Walz's deployments of the Guard.

Several Republicans criticized Walz's initial response to the widespread protests following Floyd's murder. He later responded to the murder by ordering the Minnesota legislature to reconvene for special sessions on legislation for police reform and accountability. After police reform failed to pass the first special session in June, a second special session was held in July. On July 21, the legislature passed police reform legislation. The compromise law includes a limited ban on police from using chokeholds.

It bans "warrior training", which dehumanized people, and includes training for peace officers for dealing with people with autism or in a mental health crisis and de-escalation training for situations that could turn volatile. It also created a special independent unit at the Bureau of Criminal Apprehension for investigations of fatal police encounters and a community relations advisory council to consult with the Police Officers Standards and Training Board on policy changes. Walz signed the legislation into law on July 23, 2020.

==== COVID-19 ====
On March 25, 2020, Walz issued a two-week stay-at-home order and extended closures of all "non-essential" businesses. At the time, Department of Employment and Economic Development commissioner Steve Grove estimated 28% of Minnesotans would be jobless and 39% of them would not be eligible for paid leave. Outdoor activities such as fishing, boating, and hunting were banned until April 17. The easing of restrictions coincided with protests and pressure from President Trump.

==== U.S. Immigration and Customs Enforcement ====
In May 2025, Walz called the U.S. Immigration and Customs Enforcement (ICE) agency under President Trump a "modern-day Gestapo". After the killing of Renée Good by an ICE agent in Minneapolis, Walz criticized Trump further, along with Secretary of Homeland Security Kristi Noem. It has been reported that Trump is deploying ICE agents to Minnesota not only to gain influence over the state, but also because of his personal disdain for Walz, whom Trump spread conspiracy theories about after taking office.

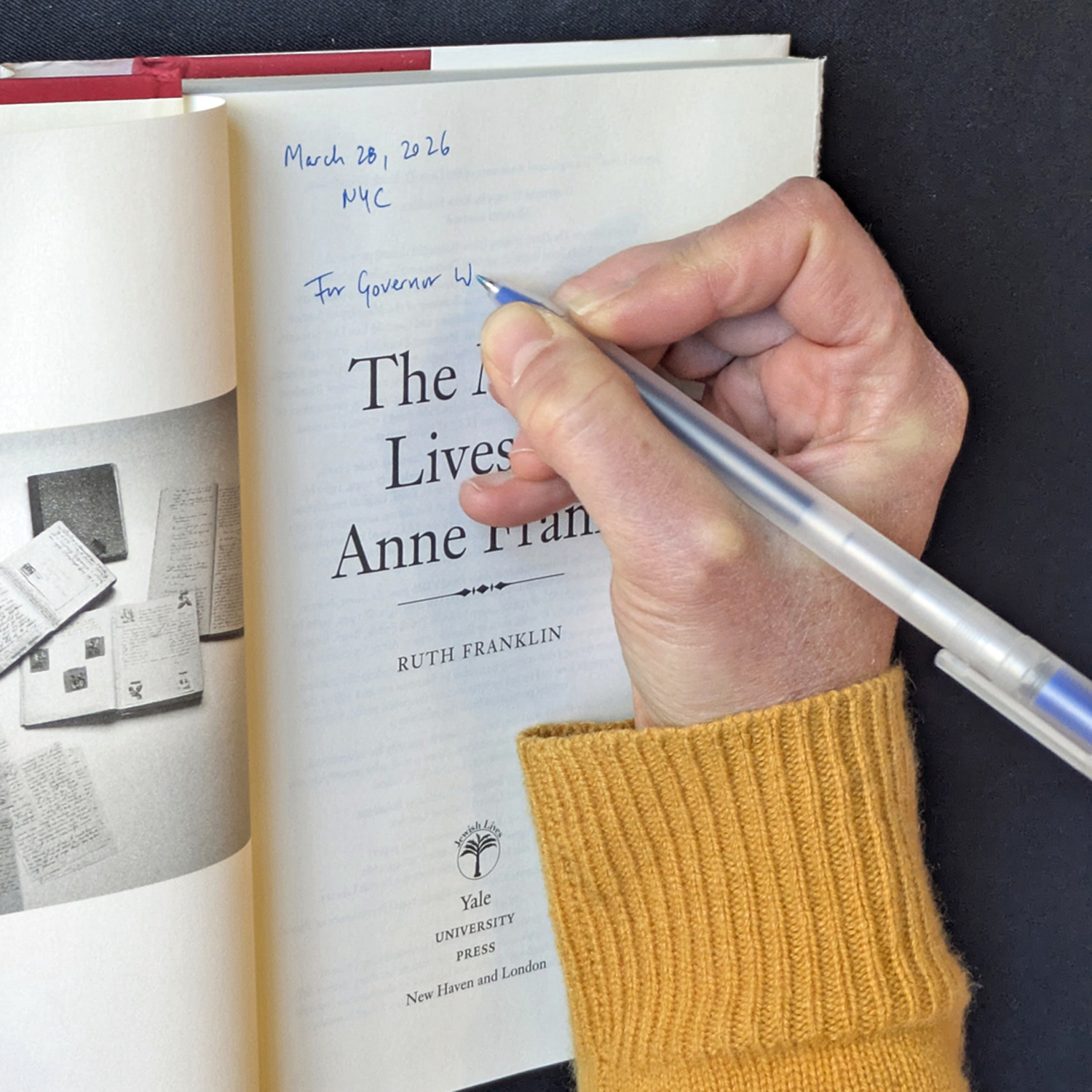
Ruth Franklin signs a copy of The Many Lives of Anne Frank for Walz.

In January 2026, while criticizing federal ICE raids after the killings of Good and Alex Pretti, Walz compared children fearful of immigration enforcement in Minnesota to Anne Frank, saying that future generations might write "that story about Minnesota". The remarks drew criticism from the United States Holocaust Memorial Museum, which said that comparing contemporary political disputes to Frank's experience was a false equivalence. Other Jewish leaders defended Walz's comments, arguing that he was referring to the fear immigrant children experienced rather than equating their circumstances with the Holocaust. In March, literary critic Ruth Franklin signed a copy of her book The Many Lives of Anne Frank for Walz at a SWAN Day event hosted by Jan Lisa Huttner. Huttner said:

Governor Walz spoke only about what Anne Frank did write about (meaning what is actually in her diary), and I sincerely believe that what he said is true: "We have got children in Minnesota hiding in their houses, afraid to go outside. Many of us grew up reading that story of Anne Frank. Somebody is going to write that children's story about Minnesota."

==== Abortion ====
In January 2023, Walz signed the Protect Reproductive Options Act, which protects access to reproductive health care including abortion, contraception, and fertility treatments in Minnesota. Abortion is legal at all stages of pregnancy in Minnesota. In April 2023, he signed the Reproductive Freedom Defense Act, which banned state agencies from "enforcing out-of-state subpoenas, arrest warrants, and extradition requests" for people who travel to Minnesota for legal abortion, limited the release of related health records, and cut funding for crisis pregnancy centers, organizations established by anti-abortion groups primarily to persuade pregnant women not to have abortions that often share inaccurate or misleading medical information.

==== Environment ====
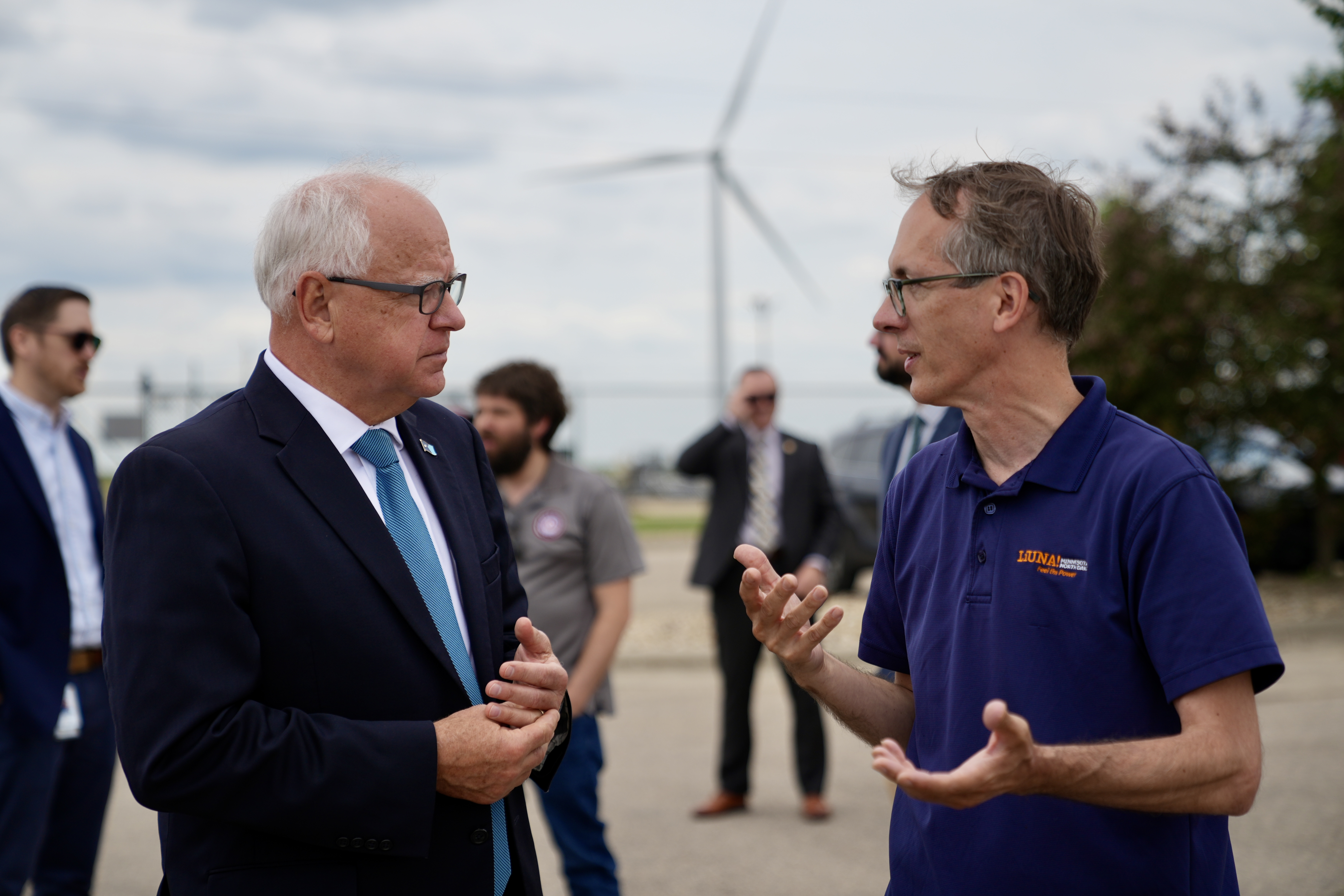
Walz speaking at a wind farm with a Liuna union worker at a signing ceremony near Dexter for permitting reform that will speed up clean energy projects

In early 2023, Walz signed a law requiring Minnesota to obtain all of its electricity from wind, solar, and other carbon-free sources by 2040, phasing out the climate-warming pollution generated by coal and gas-fired power plants, in addition to a variety of other measures to preserve and expand peatlands, forests, pollinator habitats, electric vehicle charger networks, access to home weatherization, embedded emissions cuts in buildings, green banking, and green-collar worker apprenticeships. "As I sign this legislation, communities from one end of our state to the other are looking at months of rebuilding after an extreme weather event exacerbated by climate change", Walz said in June, after catastrophic flooding devastated parts of the state. "This is a measure that will help protect our environment and get the clean energy projects that are going to help fight climate change in motion."

Walz implemented California's stricter tailpipe emissions standards for cars and set a goal of 20% electric vehicles as a share of all cars in Minnesota by 2030. Some environmentalists have criticized the state government for a lax approach to regulatory capture in the agricultural and iron processing sectors.

==== Infrastructure ====
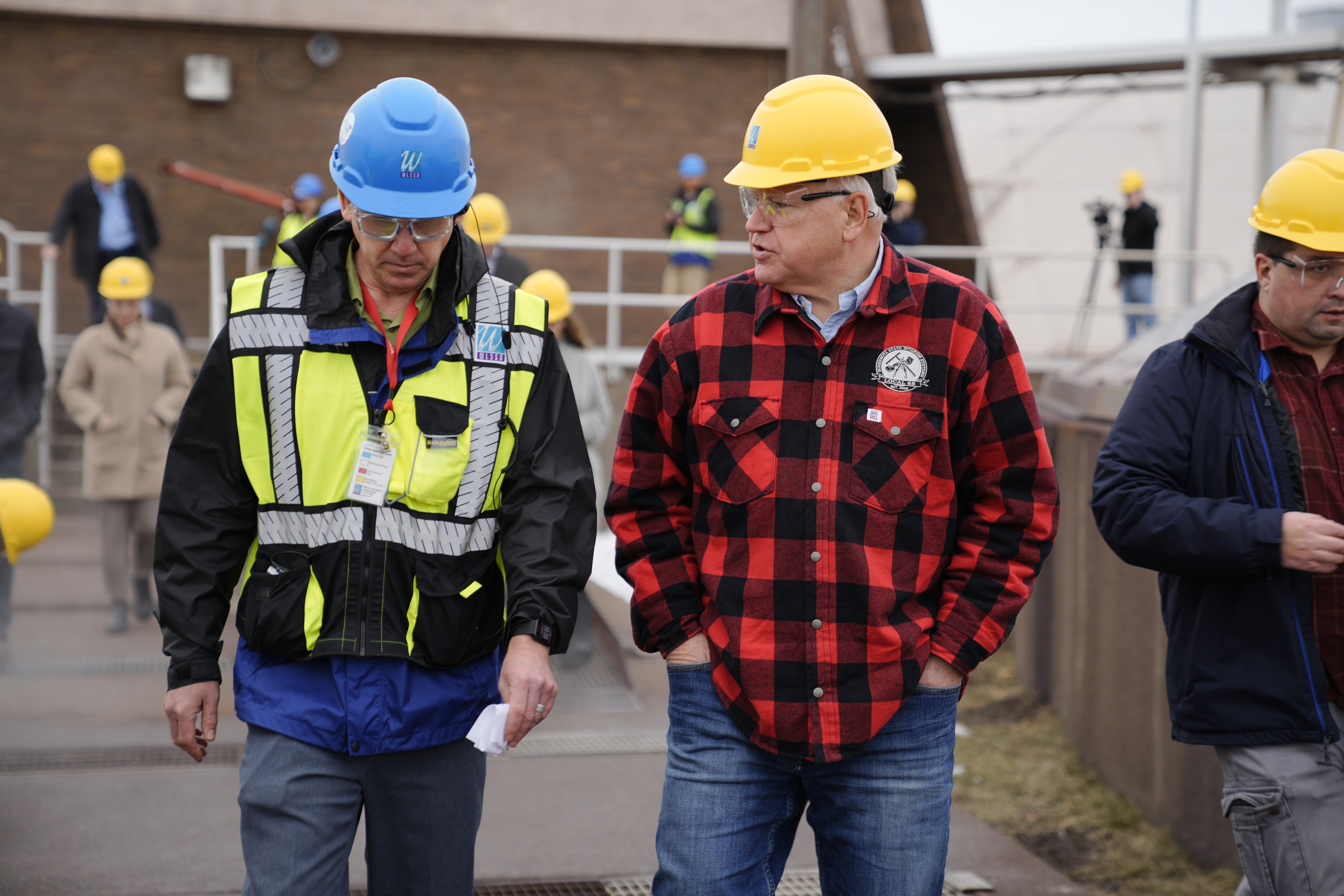
Walz visits Duluth Wastewater Plant which received funding for critical repairs as part of the infrastructure spending bill.

In 2023, Walz signed a bipartisan $2.6 billion infrastructure spending package that funded numerous union construction jobs focused on repairing roads, bridges, and other essential infrastructure. Other projects funded included a new fire hall in Dilworth, Minnesota, a water treatment plant in Mankato, and $78 million for the state veterans' home in Hastings, Minnesota. Soon afterward, Walz signed into law HF2887, which provides $9 billion over the long term to transportation projects, including reforms to climate impact considerations and transit infrastructure permitting.

In May 2024, Walz signed and implemented a bipartisan energy permitting reform bill. Some environmentalists criticized him for fast-tracking the expansion of the Line 3 pipeline and overseeing a vigorous response to the indigenous-led Stop Line 3 protests, marked by allegations of police brutality.

==== Municipal broadband ====
The omnibus commerce bill Walz signed into law in May 2024 contained provisions rescinding the state's longstanding restrictions on the establishment of publicly owned municipal broadband networks by local governments, eliminating a century-old requirement that municipal telecommunications networks be approved in an election with 65% of the vote that had been later interpreted to regulate the creation of community broadband, and liberalizing rules that limited the circumstances in which municipalities may create community broadband networks.

==== Education ====
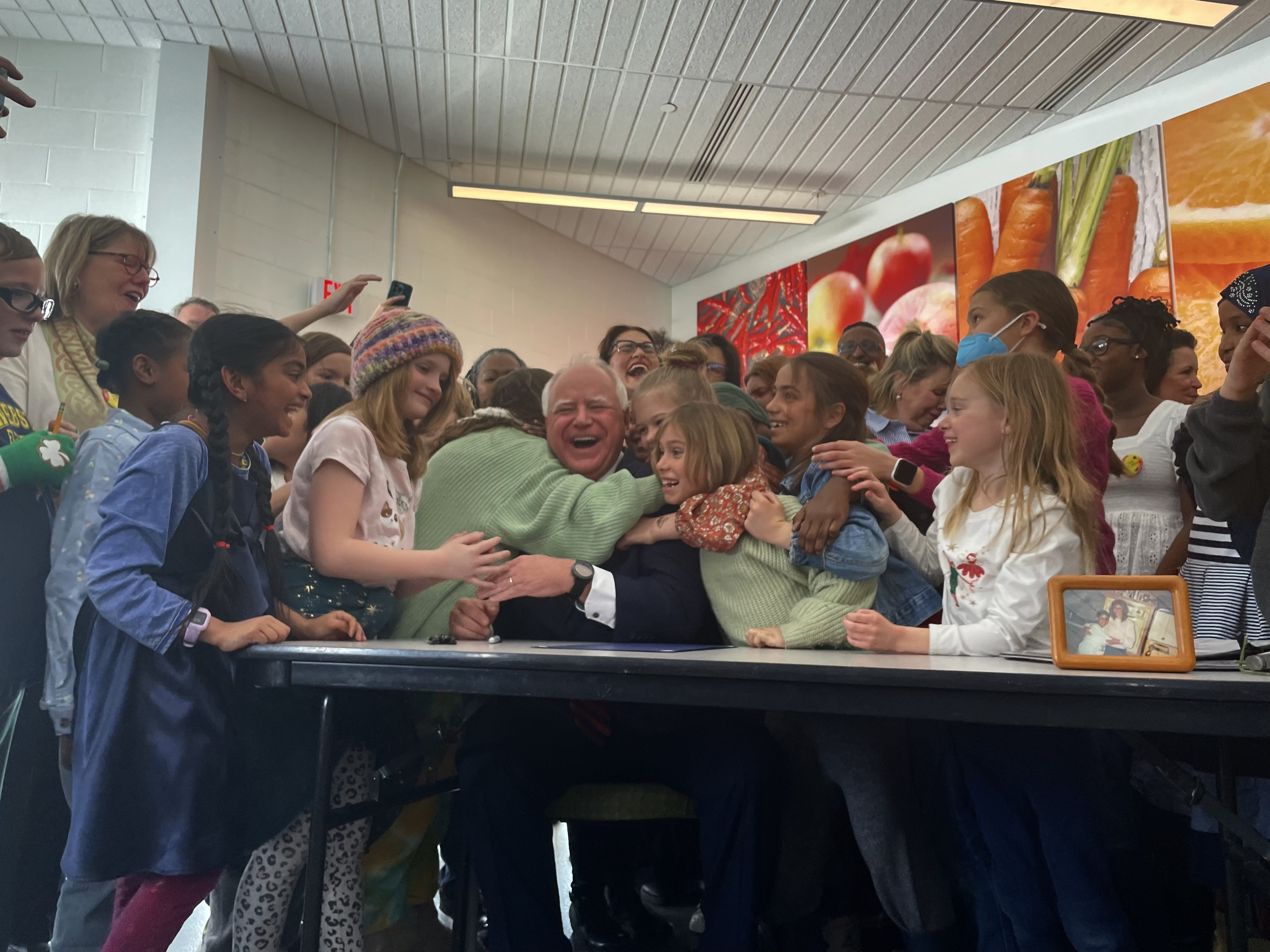
Walz hugged by children after signing universal free school meals into law

In March 2020, the COVID-19 pandemic in the United States began. Schools closed in Minnesota, and Walz was cautious about reopening them, reflecting the concerns of teachers, who were hesitant to return to in-person learning. According to Nat Malkus of the American Enterprise Institute, Minnesota schools remained remote longer than the national average during the 2020–21 school year. Malkus ranked Minnesota 19th out of 50 states for the duration of remote learning, adjusted for student enrollment. Between 2017 and 2022, Minnesota fourth-graders' test scores decreased from 10 points above the national average to 4 points above.

In 2023, Walz and the state legislature approved increased spending on K-12 and early education. At the end of the 2023 legislative session, he signed a bill allocating $2.2 billion in additional funding for K-12 education, amounting to about $400 more per student annually than previous levels. The bill also linked state education funding to inflation, addressing a long-standing request by school administrators. With the package, Walz helped make permanent a funding program to supplement child care worker wages by $316 million. He signed a bill that gave all students free school meals regardless of income.

Also in 2023, Walz signed into law the Minnesota Reading to Ensure Academic Development Act (the READ Act), with the goal to have "every Minnesota child reading at or above grade level every year, beginning in kindergarten, and to support multilingual learners and students receiving special education services in achieving their individualized reading goals."

In August 2024, Walz had announced nearly $10 million to support Minnesota's special education workforce with The Education Pipeline grants, awarded by the Minnesota Department of Education (MDE). The program will support and train special education teachers in over 35 districts, charter schools, and cooperatives. Walz said:

As a former classroom teacher for over 20 years, I understand the impact a dedicated teacher can have on their students' lives. By investing in our special education workforce, we can help ensure every student in Minnesota receives the support they need to thrive in their education.

==== Cannabis ====
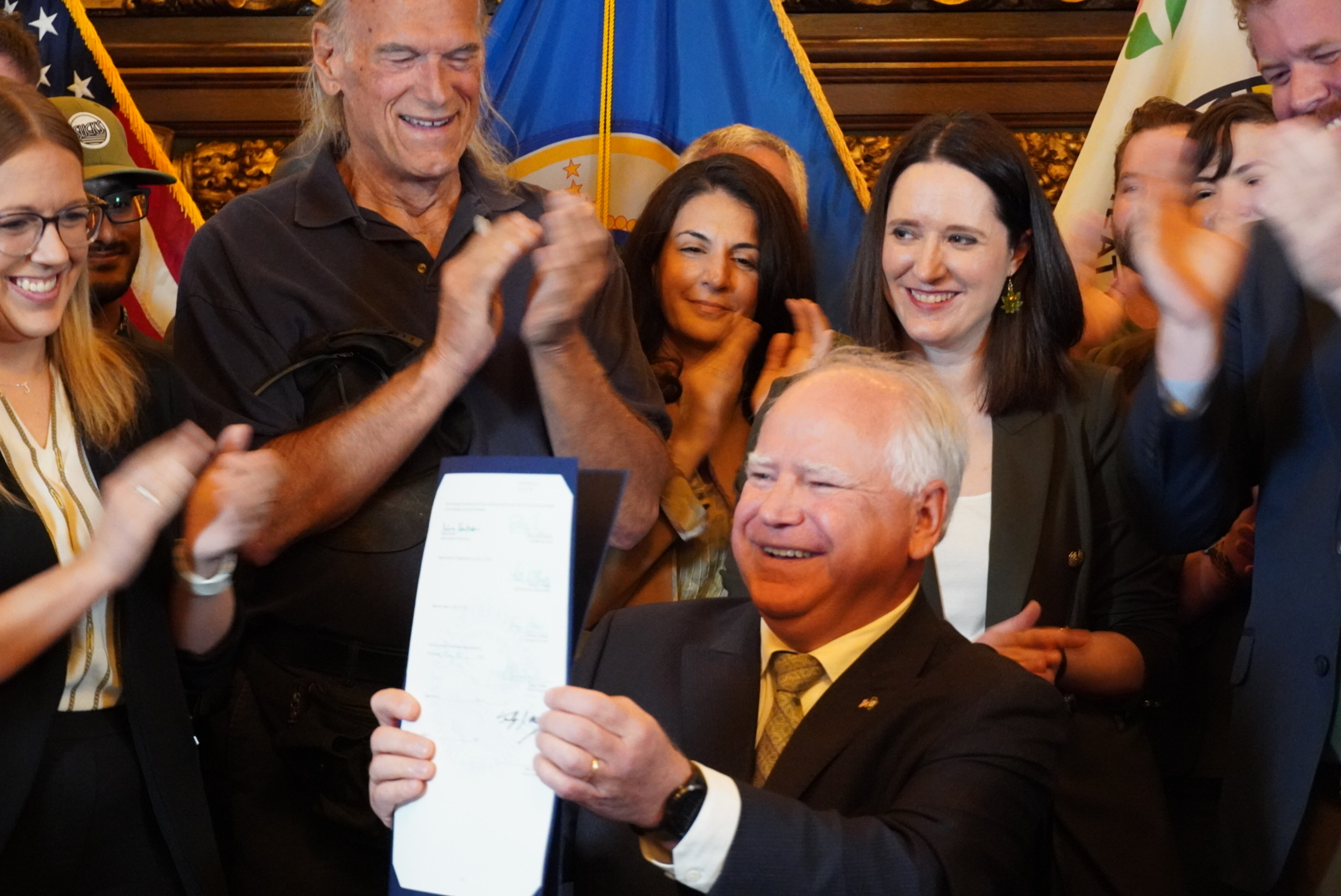
Walz at the signing ceremony for House File 100 legalizing recreational cannabis. He was joined by Minnesota's 38th governor, Jesse Ventura.

Walz advocated for the legalization of recreational cannabis as governor of Minnesota. As a candidate for governor in 2017, he said: "We have an opportunity in Minnesota to replace the current failed policy with one that creates tax revenue, grows jobs, builds opportunities for Minnesotans, protects Minnesota kids, and trusts adults to make personal decisions based on their personal freedoms." In 2022, he proposed the creation of a Cannabis Management Office to develop and implement the "regulatory framework for adult-use cannabis" in Minnesota. On May 30, 2023, he signed into law House File 100 to legalize recreational cannabis in Minnesota, which went into effect on August 1, 2023.

==== Medical debt ====
In June 2024, Walz signed the Minnesota Debt Fairness Act. Among other things, the act prevents health care providers from denying medically necessary treatment because of outstanding medical debt and prevents medical debt from affecting credit scores.

==== Native Americans ====
In 2019, Walz issued Executive Order 19-24, which requires state agencies to create and implement tribal consultation policies to guide their interaction with tribal nations in Minnesota. In November 2021, he signed the "Government to Government Relationship with Tribal Governments" bill, which codified the order into state law. In 2022, Walz appointed attorney Tadd Johnson to the University of Minnesota Board of Regents, the first Native American appointed to the board since it was established.

In August 2023, Walz signed an education bill that included education of Indigenous cultural heritage for all students. In September, he signed the return of parts of Upper Sioux Agency State Park land to the Upper Sioux Community. In December, Walz became the first Minnesota governor to visit all 11 tribal nations in the state. In 2024, he appointed Melanie Benjamin of the Mille Lacs Band of Ojibwe and Johnny Johnson of the Prairie Island Indian Community to the nine-member Minnesota Racing Commission.

==== 2023 legislative session ====
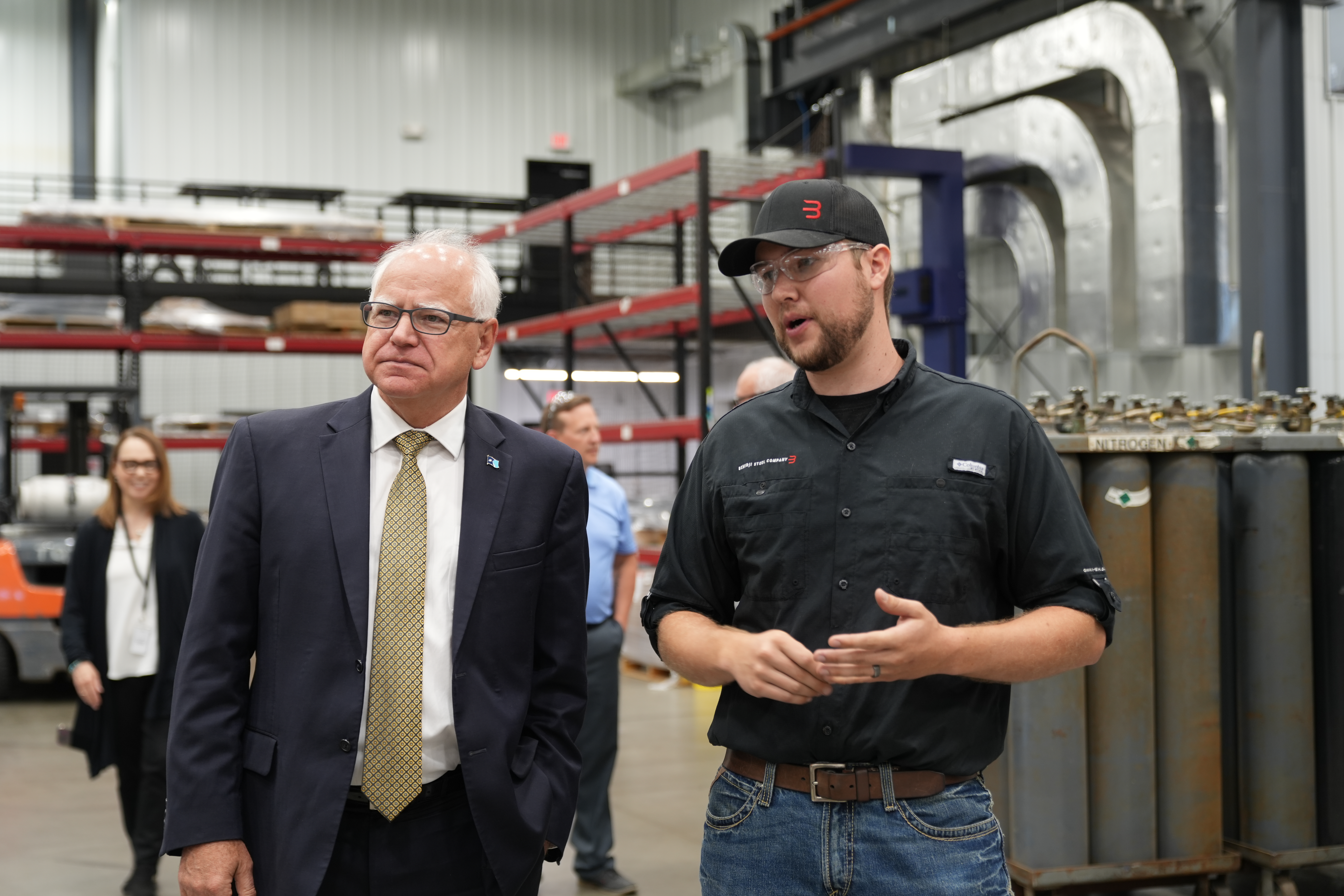
Walz visits Bemidji Steel in Minnesota, 2024.

The 93rd Minnesota Legislature, in session from January 2023 to May 2024, was the first legislature to be fully Minnesota Democratic–Farmer–Labor Party-controlled since the 88th Minnesota Legislature in 2013–2015. It passed several major reforms to Minnesota law, including requiring paid leave, banning noncompete agreements, cannabis legalization, and environmental issues, tax modifications, codifying abortion rights, universal free school meals, and universal gun background checks.

The Star Tribune called the session "one of the most consequential" ever in Minnesota; Walz called it the "most productive session in Minnesota history". While Walz signed almost all legislation passed by the legislature, he vetoed a bill intended to increase pay for rideshare drivers, his first veto as governor, saying that it did not strike the right balance.

==== National politics ====
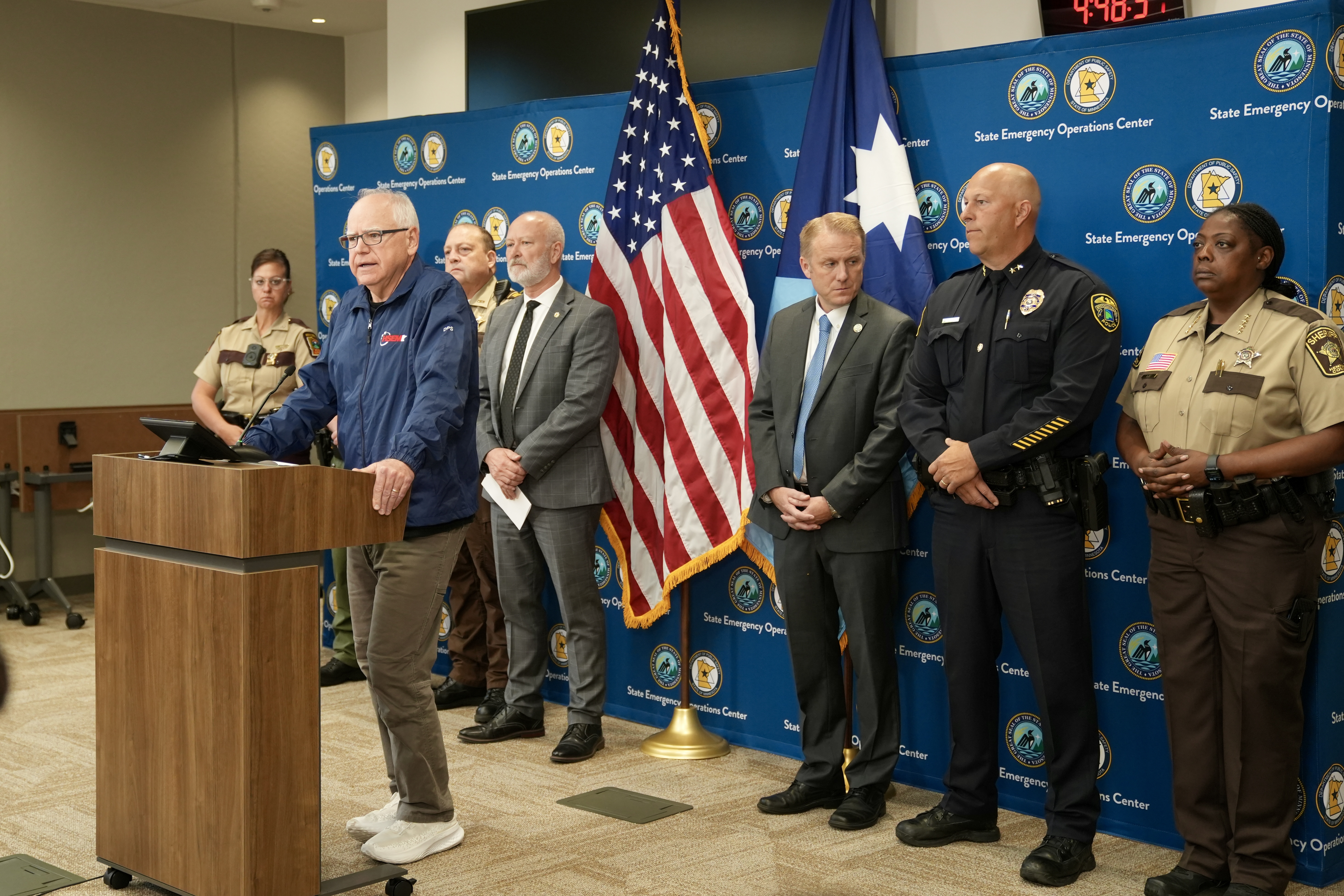
Walz at a public safety briefing following the assassination of Melissa Hortman, June 14, 2025

In February 2019, Walz endorsed the candidacy of Amy Klobuchar, Minnesota's senior U.S. senator, in the 2020 Democratic presidential primary. In August 2020, he endorsed the candidacy of Democratic nominee Joe Biden and his running mate Kamala Harris. In October 2023, Walz publicly supported Biden for reelection and dismissed U.S. Representative Dean Phillips's announcement of a run for the Democratic nomination for president, saying, "It's not going to be relevant, and we'll just move on." In July 2024, Walz was among 20 Democratic governors who met with Biden at the White House after the first presidential debate. Walz said the debate was a "bad hit" for Biden's campaign.

==== Fraud scandals ====
A series of fraud scandals occurred between 2020 and 2025 that affected Walz politically.

In 2022, federal prosecutors filed charges against the Minnesota nonprofit Feeding Our Future, which received federal funding to distribute meals to children. Prosecutors said that during the COVID-19 pandemic, Feeding Our Future had committed fraud worth over $250 million, submitting fraudulent meal sheets in order to receive funding. Several defendants, including the nonprofit's founder, were later found guilty.

It was later reported that the Minnesota Department of Education, which was responsible for distributing funds, had found irregularities in the group's paperwork as early as 2020. Following initial rejections, Feeding Our Future sued the agency and threatened to accuse it of racism (the agency mainly catered to the state's large Somali American population). The agency then resumed funding. A report by the nonpartisan state legislative auditor's office later found that the threats had affected the agency's judgment, and an investigator from the state's fraud investigation office (who was himself Somali) said that concerns over being portrayed as racist made the Walz administration reluctant to pursue fraud allegations. In January 2025, Walz announced a task force to combat fraud, saying that his administration "had a culture of being a little too trusting".

In November 2025, The New York Times reported that federal prosecutors had found more than $1 billion of fraud in three separate schemes. Walz faced criticism, with the editorial board of The Washington Post accusing him of "refusing to take accountability".

In response, President Trump signaled an interest in increasing his deportation efforts in the state by focusing on Somali immigrants. Since the scandal, political analyst Ember Reichgott Junge has said that Walz's reelection (and potential future presidential) prospects have dimmed. Polling conducted after the scandal showed Walz's approval rating at its lowest since the beginning of his second term.

In December 2025, the Department of Homeland Security and the FBI began investigating fraud by Minnesota daycare centers after a video by YouTuber Nick Shirley. None of the video's allegations were immediately confirmed. Following this national attention, members of the Minnesota Legislature's Republican caucus called on Walz to resign. He responded by saying that he had "strengthened oversight", citing his creation of an anti-fraud task force and investigations already launched by his office into several sites, including one featured in Shirley's video.

On January 14, 2026, articles of impeachment were filed against Walz due to the fraud scandals uncovered in late 2025.

== 2024 vice presidential campaign ==
The Harris/Walz logo

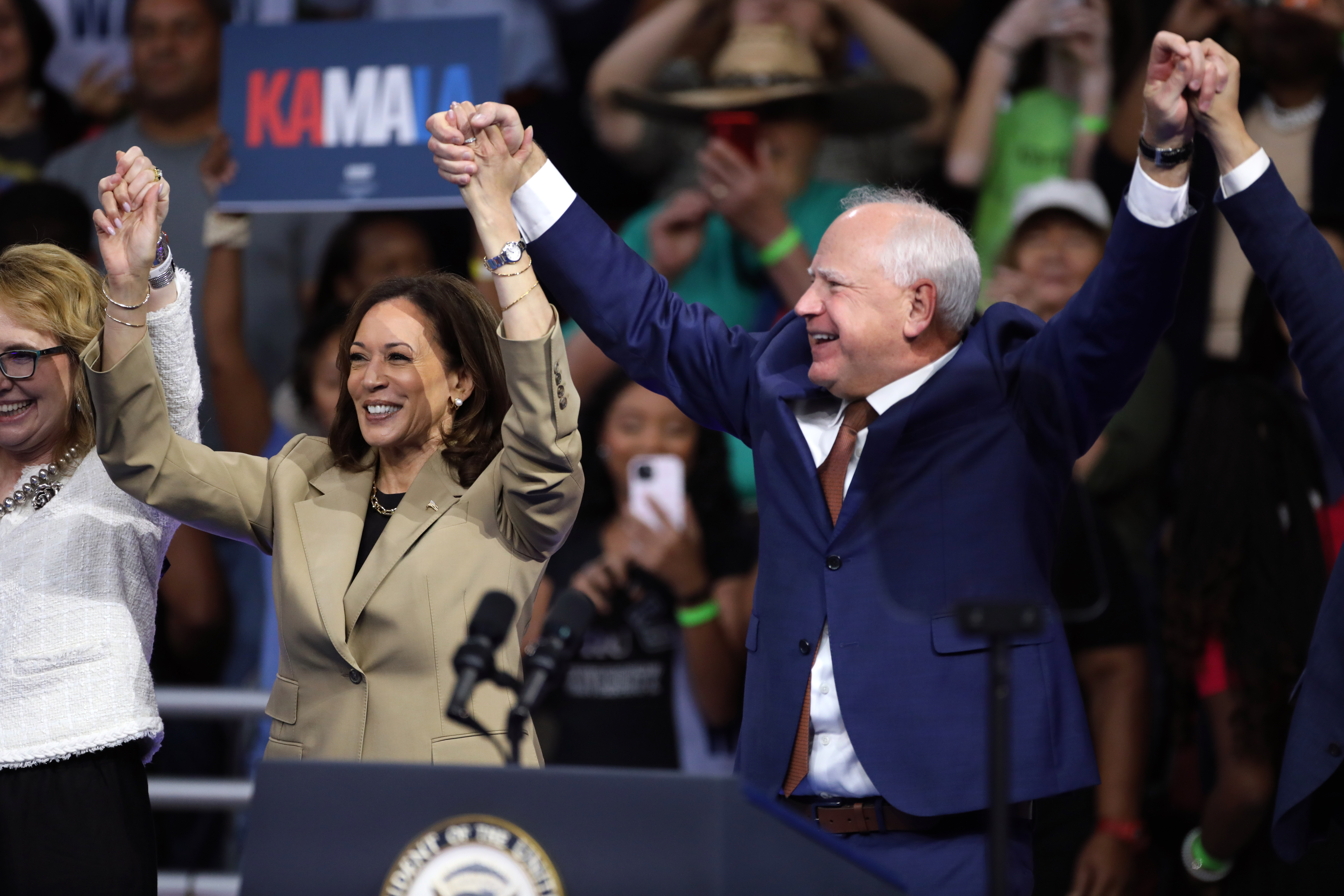
Kamala Harris and Walz at a campaign rally in Glendale, Arizona

On July 22, 2024, Walz endorsed Vice President Kamala Harris after incumbent president Joe Biden withdrew from the 2024 presidential race. After a rapid selection process in which the Harris campaign also vetted Kentucky governor Andy Beshear, Secretary of Transportation Pete Buttigieg, Arizona senator Mark Kelly, Illinois governor J. B. Pritzker, and Pennsylvania governor Josh Shapiro (with Shapiro, Kelly and Walz the only three to be interviewed by Harris in person), Harris announced on August 6 that she had chosen Walz as her running mate.

The Democratic National Committee certified Walz's candidacy on the same day it was announced. His selection was praised by an ideologically diverse group of politicians, including progressive Democratic representative Alexandria Ocasio-Cortez, centrist independent senator Joe Manchin, and moderate Republican former governor of Maryland Larry Hogan. Walz is credited with first publicly describing Donald Trump and his running mate JD Vance as "weird". The term became a popular meme, especially with young people, and has been widely used by Democrats.

No more than a day after Walz was named as Harris's running mate, his political opponents nicknamed him "Tampon Tim" for his 2023 signing of a Minnesota law that mandates that menstrual pads and tampons be provided free of charge in public schools "to all menstruating students in restrooms regularly used by students in grades 4 to 12". Walz's political supporters responded favorably to the nickname and the law, and the editorial board of the Minnesota Star Tribune published a defense of the initiative.

On August 21, 2024, the third day of the 2024 Democratic National Convention (DNC), Walz officially accepted the Democratic nomination for vice president. As of October 2024, Walz had a +2.8 favorability rating. The vice-presidential debate was held on October 1 at the CBS Broadcast Center in New York City.

The 2024 VP debate was considered a polite and policy-focused event in which Walz and JD Vance agreed with each other on many issues. During the debate, Walz was confronted with recently unearthed statements he had made in which he falsely claimed to have been in Hong Kong for a teaching position during the 1989 Tiananmen Square protests; in response, he said: "I'm a knucklehead." According to a CBS viewer poll after the debate, Vance led Walz by one percent on the question of who won the debate. Several political pundits declared Vance the winner, including columnists from The New York Times and The Wall Street Journal.

After Harris lost the election to Trump, Walz expressed regret in a March 2025 interview that her campaign had been "playing this thing too safe". He likened its strategy to a prevent defense, saying they were too focused on not losing their lead, whereas he never thought they were ahead.

== Political positions ==
Walz has been described as holding both moderate and progressive policy stances.

=== Abortion ===
Walz supports a legal right to abortion, and has a 100% rating from Planned Parenthood. The National Right to Life Committee, an anti-abortion organization, gave him a rating of zero. In a March 2024 interview with CNN's Kaitlin Collins, he said, "my neighboring states have tried to criminalize women getting health care", and characterized their policies as "a health care crisis", adding that states need to "trust women to make their own health care decisions" and to "understand that abortion is health care". Also during the interview, he said, "I think old white men need to learn how to talk about this a little more. And I think the biggest thing is: listen to women."

=== Education ===
As governor, Walz has announced funding for special needs workforce projects. He signed into law the Minnesota Reading to Ensure Academic Development (READ) Act. The act requires school districts to use evidence-based practices to teach reading. Politico wrote, "Walz set out a 'care economy'-driven agenda that prioritized everyday education concerns".

Walz also signed legislation requiring public schools to provide free breakfasts and lunches to all students, giving financial aid to public schools for households earning less than $80,000 a year, and increasing K-12 education spending by $2.2 billion.

=== Guns ===
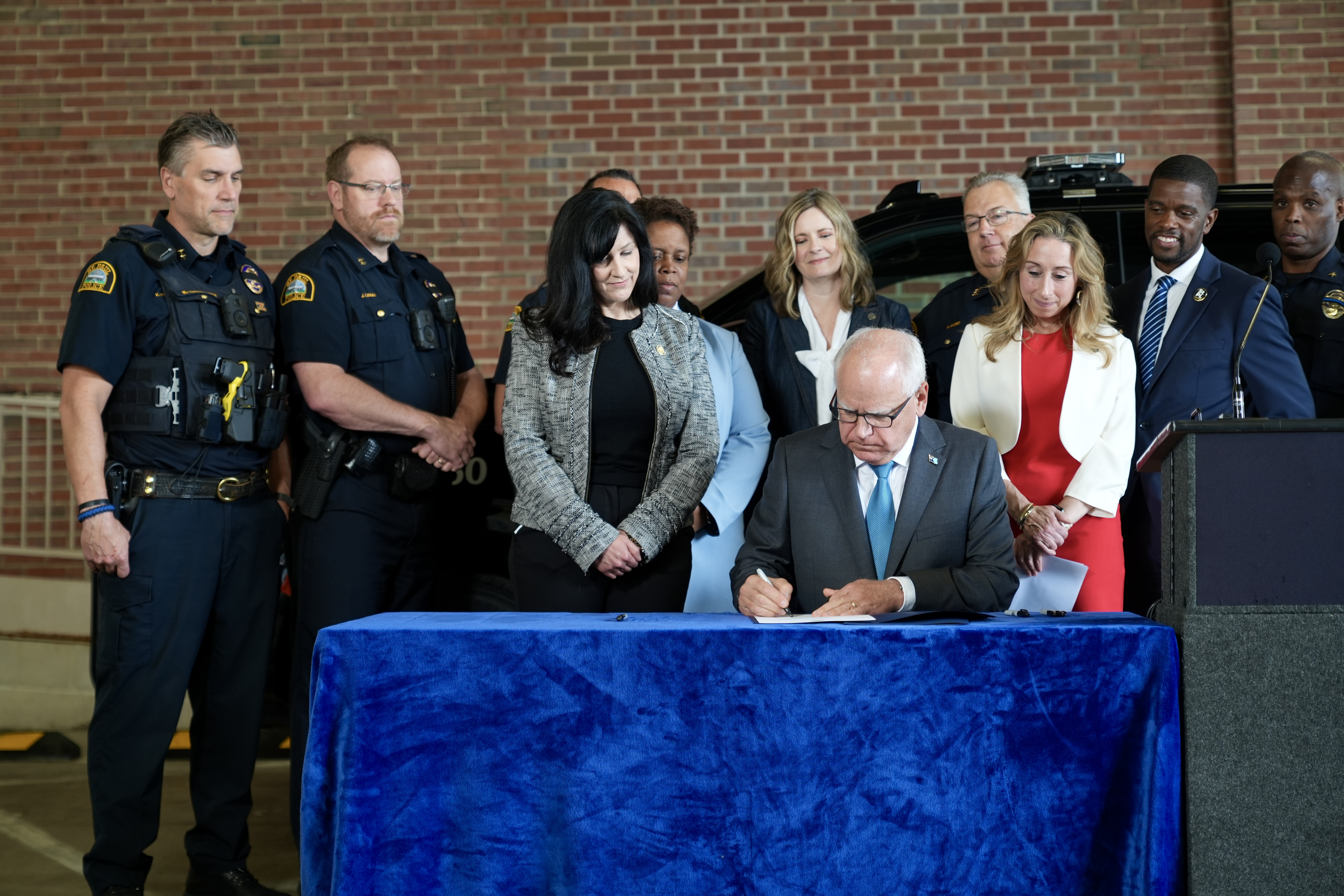
Walz signing a bill to increase penalties for individuals who facilitate gun straw purchases, 2024

Walz is a gun owner and supports increased regulations on firearms. While in Congress, Walz was a strong supporter of gun rights and was endorsed by the NRA Political Victory Fund (NRA-PVF) multiple times, receiving an A grade from the organization. Following the Parkland high school shooting in 2018, he denounced the NRA in a Star Tribune opinion piece, and announced that he would donate the equivalent of all of the campaign contributions the NRA-PVF had given him—$18,000—to the Intrepid Fallen Heroes Fund. As governor, Walz expressed support for gun regulation. In 2023, he signed into law a public safety bill that establishes universal background checks and red-flag laws in Minnesota.

=== Gaza war ===
Walz condemned Hamas's October 7 attacks in Israel. He ordered flags to be lowered to half staff in the following days. He has expressed support for a "working cease-fire" in Gaza. After the 2024 Minnesota Democratic presidential primary, in which 19% of voters cast "uncommitted" ballots, Walz took a sympathetic view toward those doing so to protest President Biden's handling of the war in Gaza, calling them "civically engaged".

Of the protests against U.S. funding of the war in Gaza, Walz said:

This issue is a humanitarian crisis. They have every right to be heard... These folks are asking for a change in course, they're asking for more pressure to be put on... You can hold competing things: that Israel has the right to defend itself, and the atrocities of October 7 are unacceptable, but Palestinian civilians being caught in this... has got to end.

Walz has been the subject of criticism in several such protests due to his acting role as chair of the Minnesota State Board of Investment. In February 2024, 14 people protesting Minnesota's investments in Israel were cited for trespassing at his residence during a sit-in organized by the Minnesota Anti-War Committee.

In July 2024, Walz was criticized by the Minnesota chapters of the Council on American–Islamic Relations and American Muslims for Palestine after he abruptly canceled a meeting with Palestinian Minnesotans who had lost relatives in Gaza. A member of American Muslims for Palestine who was scheduled to meet with Walz said:

He has never, not once, decided to sit down to meet with a Gazan family. He's refused all attempts to sit down and talk to any of us, and he has refused to meet with a single mosque here in Minnesota about what's happening in Gaza.

Minnesota labor unions have similarly urged the State Board of Investment to divest state pension funds from Israel. In October 2024, the Minnesota Association of Professional Employees passed a divestment resolution. In April 2025, the union released an additional "Pension Divestment Statement" implicating the State Board of Investment and emphasizing that:

This genocide has been supported not just through our tax dollars and US military aid, but also through investments from our state pension system, which has invested in direct loans—bonds—to the Israeli government and in arms suppliers for the Israeli military.

=== Labor and workers' rights ===
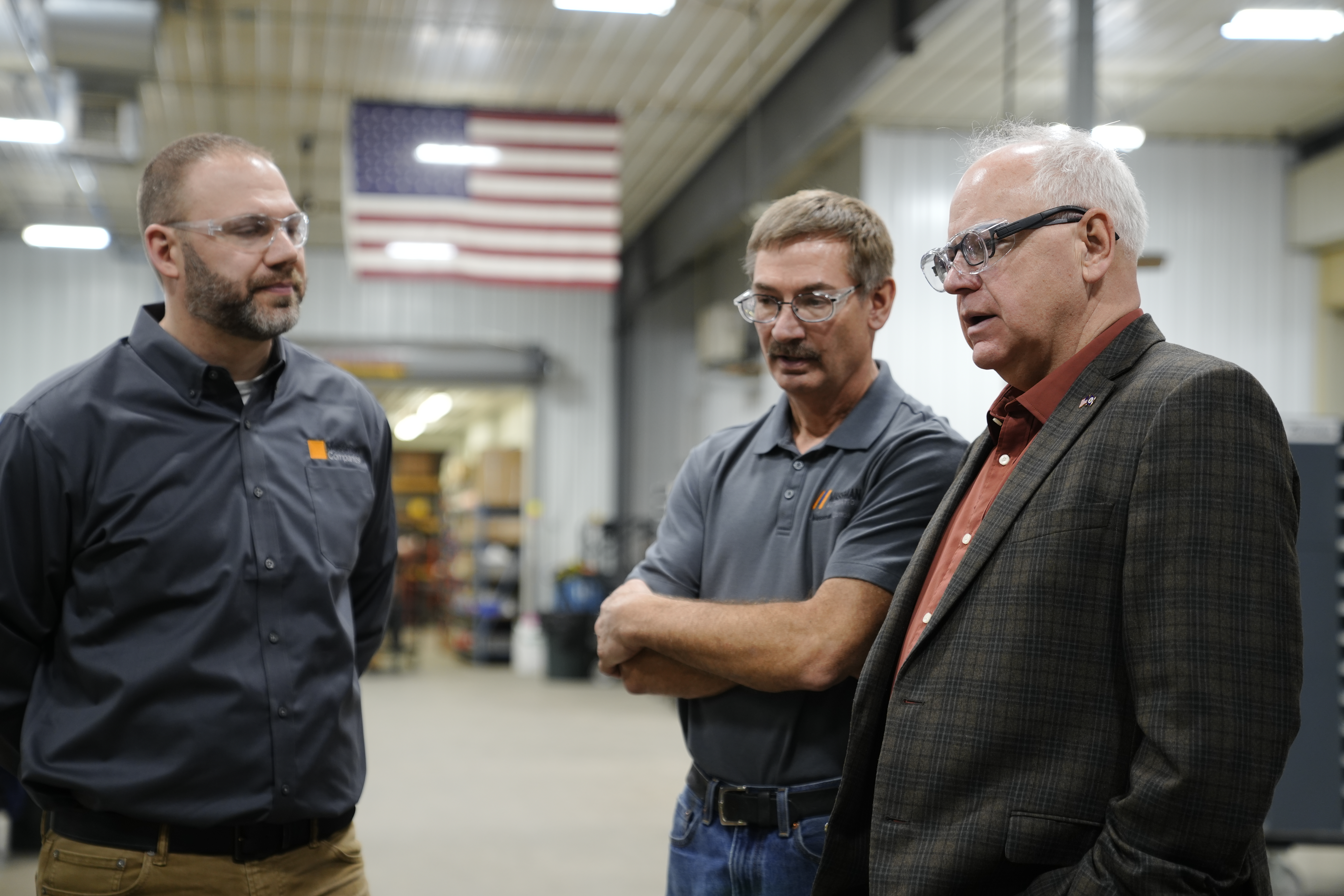
Walz talking with workers at the Massman Automation manufacturing plant, 2024

In 2023, Walz signed a law banning captive audience meetings and non-compete clauses. The law also mandates paid sick leave for employees and increases safety inspections and ergonomics requirements to reduce the risk of repetitive strain injuries for warehouse, meatpacking, and healthcare facility workers. It also grants workers some of the strongest protections against wage theft. In October 2023, Walz joined the striking United Auto Workers' picket line. He is a former member of two teachers' unions, the National Education Association and the American Federation of Teachers. Addressing the American Federation of State, County and Municipal Employees in August 2024, Walz said, "It's not just a saying, it's a fact: when unions are strong, America is strong."

=== LGBTQ rights ===
Walz supports LGBTQ rights, including federal anti-discrimination laws on the basis of sexual orientation. In a 2009 speech, he called for an end to the "Don't ask, don't tell" policy. Walz voted in favor of the Matthew Shepard and James Byrd Jr. Hate Crimes Prevention Act and the Sexual Orientation Employment Nondiscrimination Act. In 2007, he received a 90% grade from the Human Rights Campaign, the nation's largest LGBTQ rights organization.

In 2011, Walz announced his support for the Respect for Marriage Act. As governor, he has signed a number of bills that support the LGBTQ community. In 2023, he signed bills that banned the practice of conversion therapy and protected gender-affirming care in Minnesota.

=== Veterans' issues ===
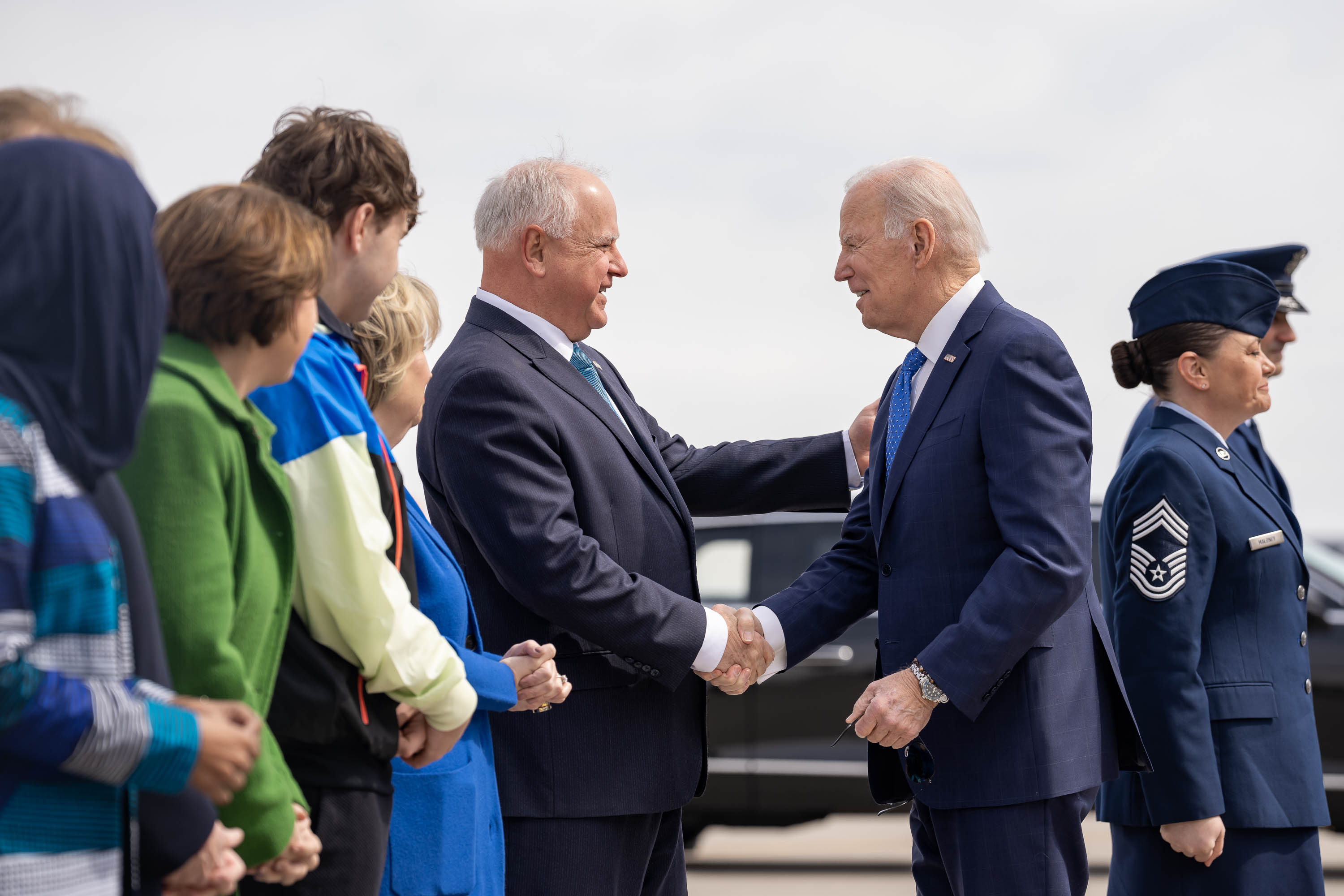
Walz greeting President Joe Biden, 2023

Having served 24 years in the Army National Guard, as a freshman in Congress Walz was given a rare third committee membership when he was assigned to the House Committee on Veterans' Affairs.

Walz was the lead House sponsor of the Clay Hunt Suicide Prevention for American Veterans Act, which directs the Veterans Administration to report on veteran mental health care and suicide prevention programs. It also gives the VA permission to provide incentives to psychiatrists who agree to join the VA medical system.

== Personal life ==
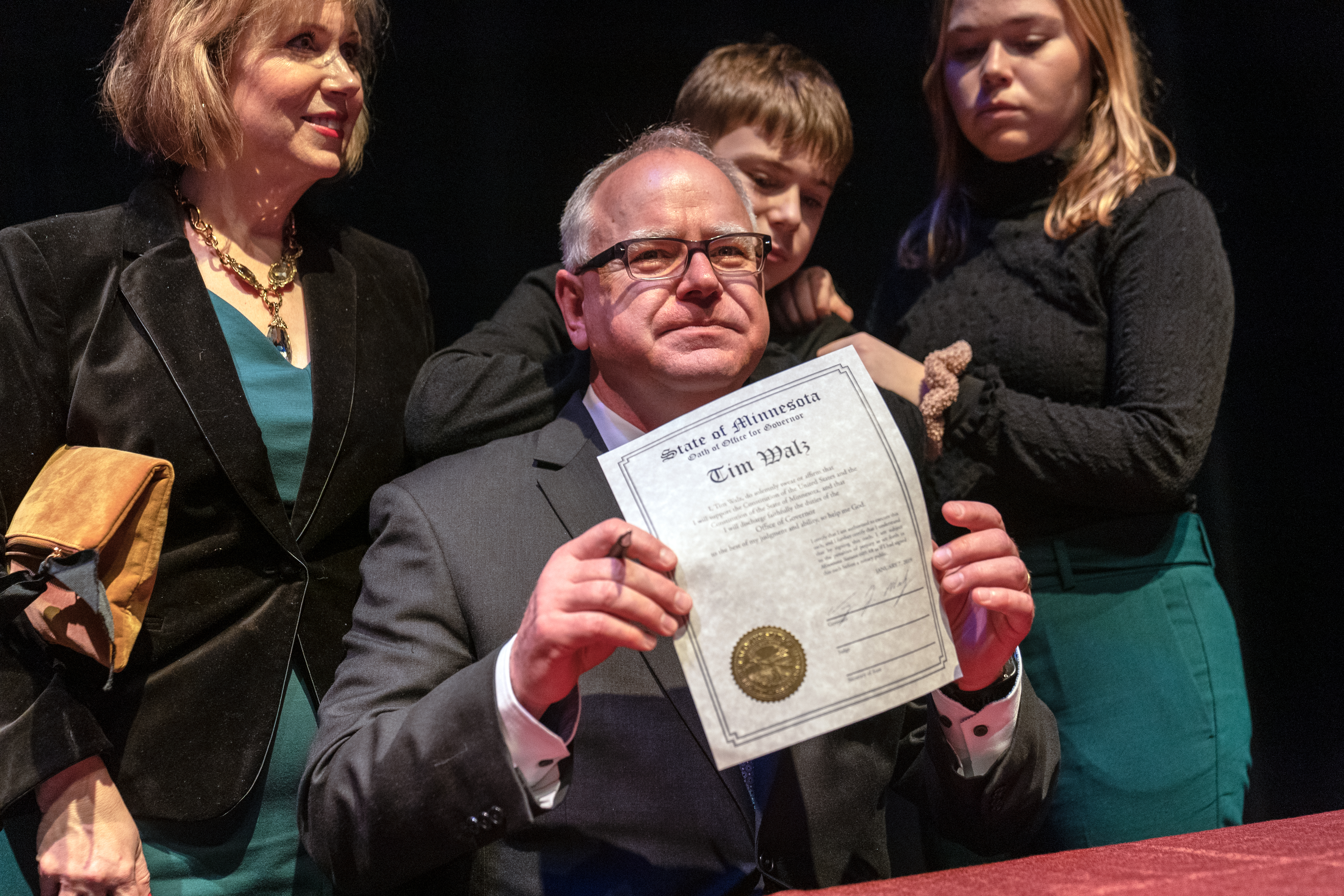
Left to right: Gwen, Tim, Gus, and Hope Walz in 2019

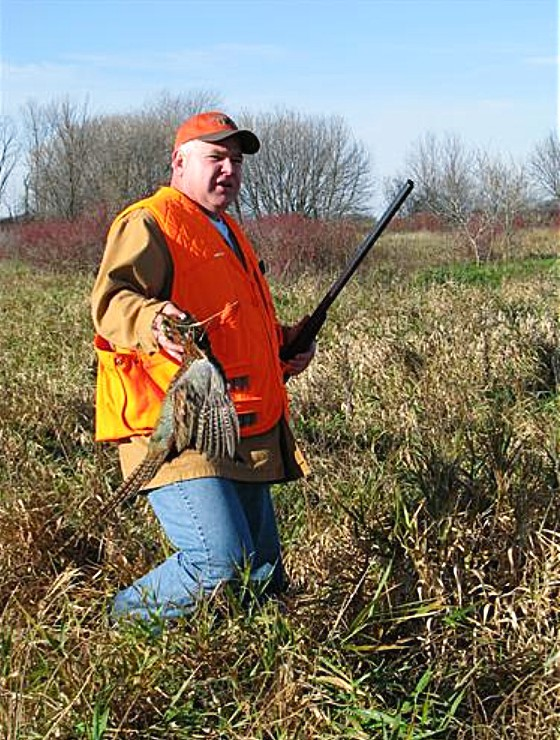
Walz pheasant hunting in 2008

Walz and Gwen Whipple met while working as teachers in Nebraska. Their first date was at a movie theater and a Hardee's. They married on June 4, 1994. Tim, who was raised Catholic, became a Lutheran after marrying Gwen. He has called himself a "Minnesota Lutheran" and identified Pilgrim Lutheran Church in St. Paul, Minnesota, a congregation in the Evangelical Lutheran Church in America, as his family's parish.

Walz's younger brother, Craig, was a high school science teacher in St. Charles, Minnesota. Walz's older brother, Jeff, was a former assistant principal at a middle school in Citrus County, Florida. Walz's older sister, Sandy Dietrich, is a former teacher from Alliance.

In 1995, Walz was arrested for driving 96 miles per hour in a 55 miles per hour zone in Chadron, Nebraska. According to arrest records, he failed a field sobriety test administered by a trooper who smelled alcohol under his breath. Walz's blood alcohol level tested above the legal limit. In 1996, Walz pleaded guilty to a reduced charge for reckless driving, was fined $200, and had his license suspended for 30 days. After the incident, Walz resigned from his coaching position but kept his job as a teacher.

The Walzes underwent fertility treatment at Mayo Clinic for seven years before their children were born. Their daughter, Hope, was born in 2001 and their son, Gus, in 2006. Walz and his wife named Hope after their emotion about the pregnancy.

Walz learned some Mandarin while teaching in China.

Hope graduated from Mankato West High School in 2018 and Montana State University in 2023. She works as a ski instructor at Big Sky Resort and at a homeless shelter in Bozeman, Montana. Hope has appeared in social media campaign ads for Walz. Historian Kate Andersen Brower considers this role unique for a vice-presidential campaign.

Gus attended Saint Paul Central High School. As a teenager he was diagnosed with non-verbal learning disorder, ADHD, and an anxiety disorder. Hope and Gus appeared onstage at the 2024 DNC, where their tearful cheering from the audience went viral. Videos of Gus became popular for representing neurodivergence, in what became called the "Gus Walz effect".

The family lived in Mankato, Minnesota, for nearly 20 years before moving to Saint Paul upon Walz's election as governor. Walz and his wife sold their home when they moved into the governor's residence in 2019. According to financial disclosures made while he was in Congress, which a spokesperson for his 2024 campaign confirmed, they have owned no stocks or securities. Their pensions are their only noteworthy asset.

As of 2024, Walz has a modest financial profile. He owns no businesses, lists no income besides his salary as governor and his wife's teaching salary, and owns no property. His family resides in the Minnesota Governor's residence. The state is temporarily paying for them to live in Eastcliff while essential renovations are made. The Walzes reported income of $166,000 on their 2022 tax return. This places Walz among the least wealthy people ever to run for vice president.

The family has a Labrador Retriever named Scout. They got the dog after the 2018 gubernatorial election; Walz had promised he would get Gus a dog if he won. Scout was a rescue from a Minnesota nonprofit, Midwest Animal Rescue and Services. Walz's cat, Afton, went missing in August 2023. He adopted another cat, Honey, in December 2023.

He is a distant cousin of Nebraska state senator and Democratic nominee in the 2026 Nebraska gubernatorial election Lynne Walz.

== Awards and decorations ==
=== Agriculture ===
In 2017, Walz was one of 33 U.S. senators and representatives to receive the Golden Triangle Award from the National Farmers Union for "demonstrated leadership and support at the federal policymaking level for family farmers, ranchers and their rural communities".

=== Public service ===
In 2026, Walz received the Joan and Walter Mondale Award for Public Service at the Humphrey-Mondale Awards.

=== Military ===
Walz's military awards and decorations include:

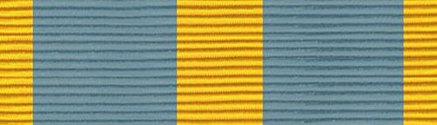

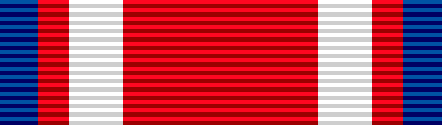

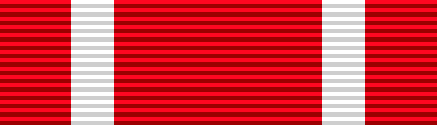

	Army Commendation Medal	
Army Achievement Medal One oak leaf cluster	Army Reserve Components Achievement Medal Five oak leaf clusters	National Defense Service Medal One service star
Global War on Terrorism Service Medal	Armed Forces Reserve Medal with silver hourglass device	Armed Forces Reserve Medal with M device
NCO Professional Development Ribbon	Army Service Ribbon	Reserve Components Overseas Training Ribbon Three oak leaf clusters
Minnesota Good Conduct Medal with silver star	Minnesota State Active Duty Ribbon One oak leaf cluster	Minnesota State Service Ribbon One oak leaf cluster

== Notes ==
U.S. House of Representatives
Preceded by Gil Gutknecht	Member of the U.S. House of Representatives from Minnesota's 1st congressional district 2007–2019	Succeeded by Jim Hagedorn
Preceded by Mark Takano; Acting	Ranking Member of the House Veterans' Affairs Committee; 2017–2019	Succeeded by Phil Roe
Party political offices
Preceded by Mark Dayton	Democratic nominee for Governor of Minnesota; 2018, 2022	Succeeded by Amy Klobuchar
Preceded by Kamala Harris	Democratic nominee for Vice President of the United States; 2024	Most recent
Preceded by Phil Murphy	Chair of the Democratic Governors Association; 2023–2024	Succeeded by Laura Kelly
Political offices
Preceded by Mark Dayton	Governor of Minnesota; 2019–present	Incumbent
U.S. order of precedence (ceremonial)
Preceded by JD Vance as Vice President	Order of precedence of the United States; Within Minnesota	Succeeded by Mayor of city in which event is held
Preceded by JD Vance as Vice President	Order of precedence of the United States; Within Minnesota	Succeeded by Otherwise Mike Johnson as Speaker of the House
Preceded by Gavin Newsom as Governor of California	Order of precedence of the United States; Outside Minnesota	Succeeded by Tina Kotek as Governor of Oregon
