= List of Indian reservations in Minnesota =

Map of reservations in Minnesota

This is a list of Indian reservations in the U.S. state of Minnesota.

== List of reservations ==
Reservation name	Tribe	Counties	Map	Population (Note: Population includes reservation and off-reservation trust land, if applicable.)	Notes
Bois Forte Indian Reservation	Ojibwe	Itasca, Koochiching, and St. Louis		984	
Fond du Lac Indian Reservation	Ojibwe	Carlton and St. Louis		4,184	Owns off-reservation trust land in Douglas County, Wisconsin.
Grand Portage Indian Reservation	Ojibwe	Cook		618	
Leech Lake Indian Reservation	Ojibwe	Beltrami, Cass, Hubbard, and Itasca		11,388	
Lower Sioux Indian Reservation	Sioux	Redwood		534	
Mille Lacs Indian Reservation	Ojibwe	Mille Lacs		4,767	Also operates the Sandy Lake Indian Reservation in Aitkin County, with off-reservation trust land and other holdings in Atkin, Crow Wing, Kanabec, Morrison, and Otter Tail Counties.
Prairie Island Indian Community	Sioux	Goodhue		310	
Red Lake Indian Reservation	Ojibwe	Beltrami, Clearwater, Koochiching, Lake of the Woods, Marshall, Pennington, Polk, and Red Lake		5,506	
Shakopee Mdewakanton Sioux Community	Sioux	Scott		779	
Upper Sioux Indian Reservation	Sioux	Yellow Medicine		120	
White Earth Indian Reservation	Ojibwe	Becker, Clearwater, and Mahnomen		9,726	

Additionally, the Ho-Chunk Nation of Wisconsin owns off-reservation trust land in Houston County, just outside of La Crescent.

== See also ==
- List of Indian reservations in the United States
- List of federally recognized tribes in Minnesota
- Minnesota Chippewa Tribe, the governmental authority for 6 Ojibwe bands in the state
