= Doug McFarland =

Douglas Dale McFarland

Personal details
- Born: Douglas Dale McFarland; July 18, 1946 (age 80) Portland, Oregon
- Party: Republican
- Spouse: Mary Elisabeth McFarland
- Education: Macalester College (BA); New York University (JD); University of Minnesota (PhD)

Douglas Dale McFarland (born July 18, 1946) is a professor emeritus at Hamline University School of Law, a Minnesota politician, and an author.

== Biography and titles ==
He was born in Portland, Oregon and grew up in Sioux Falls, South Dakota. He received a B.A. in political science from Macalester College, a J.D. from New York University School of Law, and a Ph.D. in speech-communication from the University of Minnesota. Before coming to Hamline, Dr. McFarland was an attorney at the Minneapolis-based law firm of Dorsey & Whitney, practicing in the areas of corporate law and litigation. McFarland began his teaching career at Hamline in 1974 and was named emeritus professor in 2013, having been elected Professor of the Year five times by students. He was Administrative Assistant, a position now titled Counselor, to Chief Justice Warren E. Burger in the Supreme Court of the United States from 1985 to 1986, and prior to that was a Tom C. Clark Judicial Fellow at the Court. He is a member of Phi Beta Kappa and the Federalist Society. Dr. McFarland was Associate Dean for Teaching and Scholarship from 2002 to 2005, and has been Admissions Chair, Curriculum Chair, Development Task Force Chair, Faculty Appointments Chair, and Promotion and Tenure Chair.

== Politics ==
McFarland ran for David Durenberger's Minnesota U.S. Senate seat in 1994. He dropped out of the Senate race in May, 1994, when his campaign ran out of money. He then cast his support for Bert McKasy. In June he became the Lieutenant Governor running mate for Allen Quist, but the two lost in the primary election. Three years later, he garnered some votes in the race for Minnesota Attorney General in the 1997 convention, but withdrew from the race.

== Polls ==
=== Senate ===
- GOP Primary Mason-Dixon Favorable 2/21/94
  - Rod Grams, 38%
  - Joanell Dyrstad, 28%
  - Doug McFarland, 9%
  - Bert McKasy, 3%
- Among All Mason-Dixon Favorable 2/21/94
  - Rod Grams (R), 26%
  - Joanell Dyrstad (R), 26%
  - Tom Foley (D), 25%
  - Collin Peterson (D), 17%
  - Ann Wynia (D), 11%
  - Tom Berg (D), 9%
  - Linda Berglin (D), 9%
  - Gen Olson (R), 9%
  - Doug McFarland (R), 5%
  - Bert McKasy (R), 3%
- Star Tribune Name Recognition (Lower, Better)
  - Rod Grams (R), 41%
  - Collin Peterson (D), 61%
  - Doug McFarland (R), 69%
  - Tom Berg (D), 71%
  - Linda Berglin (D), 72%
  - Pat McGowan (R), 73%
  - Gen Olson (R), 78%
  - Bert McKasy (R), 81%
  - Ann Wynia (D), 84%
- Pioneer Press Name Recognition (Higher, Better)
  - Tom Foley (D), 67%
  - Rod Grams (R), 66%
  - Collin Peterson (D), 48%
  - Doug McFarland (R), 35%
  - Tom Berg (D), 33%
  - Linda Berglin (D), 33%
  - Gen Olson (R), 16%
  - Ann Wynia (D), 14%
  - Bert McKasy (R), 7%

=== Attorney general ===
- Republican Convention Straw Poll
  - Charlie Weaver, 58%
  - Doug McFarland, 29%
  - John Graham, 7%

== Published works ==
  - CHIEF JUSTICE: A SUPREME COURT INSIDER'S NOVEL (2014) [website www.dougmcfarlandbooks.com].
  - FEW ARE CHOSEN: A CAMPAIGN MEMOIR (2008).
  - Nineteen computer-assisted law learning exercises available on the website of the Center for Computer-Assisted Legal Instruction [cali.org].
  - Viewing the "Same Case or Controversy" of Supplemental Jurisdiction Through the Lens of the "Common Nucleus of Operative Fact" of Pendent Jurisdiction, 45 TEX. TECH L. REV. 905 (2013).
  - Supplemental Jurisdiction over Permissive Counter-claims and Set Offs: A Misconception, 64 MERCER L. REV. 437 (2013).
  - Seeing the Forest for the Trees: The Transaction or Occurrence and the Claim Interlock Civil Procedure, 12 FLA. COASTAL L. REV. 247 (2011).
  - In Search of the Transaction or Occurrence: Counterclaims, 40 CREIGHTON L. REV. 699 (2007).
  - The True Compass: No Federal Question in a State Law Claim, 55 U. KAN. L. REV. 1 (2006).
  - A Personal Tribute to Chief Justice Rehnquist, 29 HAMLINE L. REV. 1 (2006).
  - A Personal Tribute to Chief Justice Rehnquist, 29 HAMLINE L. REV. 1 (2006).
  - Computer-Assisted Exercises on Civil Procedure (CALI, 6th ed. published electronically on cali.org); West, 5th ed. 2004; 4th ed. 1995; 3d ed. 1991) (with Roger C. Park).
  - Dictum Run Wild: How Long-Arm Statutes Extended to the Limits of Due Process, 84 B. U. L. REV. 491 (2004).
  - Drop the Shoe: A Law of Personal Jurisdiction, 68 MO. L. REV. 753 (2003).
  - Present Sense Impressions Cannot Live in the Past, 28 FLA. ST. U. L. REV. 907 (2001).
  - MINNESOTA CIVIL PRACTICE (Lexis 4th ed. 2008, plus supplements; 3d ed. 1999; Butterworths, 2d ed. 1990; Mason, 1st ed. 1979) (with William J. Keppel).
  - THE FUTURE OF LEGAL EDUCATION, IN FOR THE RECORD: 150 YEARS OF LAW & LAWYERS IN MINNESOTA (Minnesota State Bar Association, 1999).
  - Profiles of all 26 Minnesota Chief Justices and Chief Judges, in FOR THE RECORD: 150 YEARS OF LAW & LAWYERS IN MINNESOTA (Minnesota State Bar Association, 1999).
  - Chief Justice Warren E. Burger: A Personal Tribute, 19 HAMLINE L. REV. 1 (1995).
  - The Unconstitutional Stub of Section 1441(c), 54 Ohio St. L.J. 1059 (1993).
  - The Need for a New National Court, 100 HARV. L. REV. 1400 (1987) (with Thomas E. Baker).
  - Students and Practicing Lawyers Identify the Ideal Law Professor, 36 J. LEGAL EDUC. 93 (1986).
  - Self-Images of Law Professors: Rethinking the Schism in Legal Education, 35 J. LEGAL EDUC. 232 (1985).
  - Dead Men Tell Tales: Thirty Times Three Years of the Judicial Process After Hillmon, 30 VILL. L. REV. 1 (1985).
  - Rhetorical Visions of Committed Voters in the 1980 Presidential Campaign, 1 J. CRITICAL STUD. MASS COMMUNICATION 287 (1984) (with Ernest Bormann, Becky Kroll, and Kathy Watters).

== See also ==
- CALI
- David Durenberger
- Joanell Dyrstad
- Rod Grams
- Collin Peterson
- Hamline University
- Macalester College
- Warren Burger
