= 2006 United States Senate election in Minnesota =

- November 7, 2006
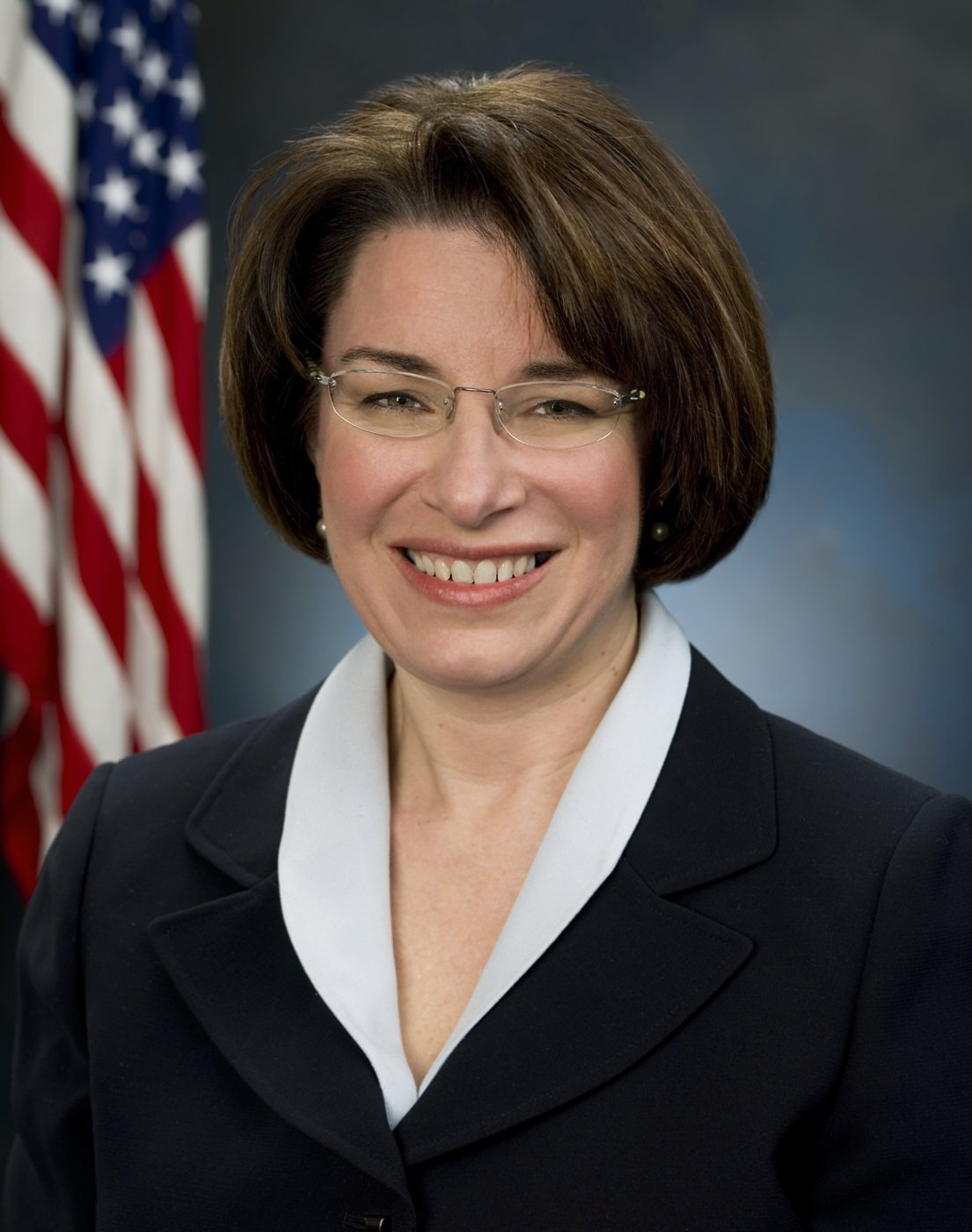

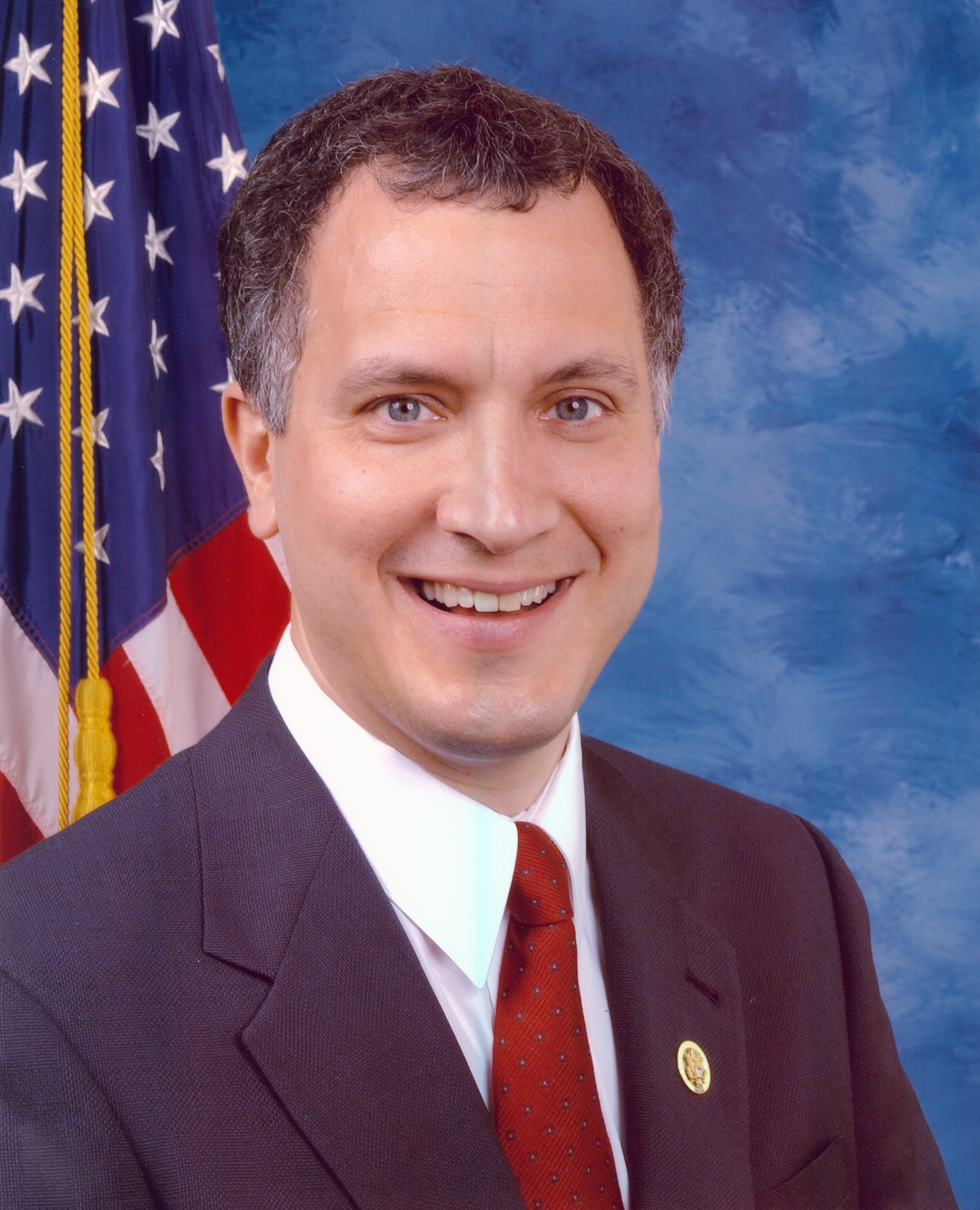
Nominee	Amy Klobuchar	Mark Kennedy
Party	Democratic (DFL)	Republican
Popular vote	1,278,849	835,653
Percentage	58.06%	37.94%
- Klobuchar: 40–50% 50–60% 60–70% 70–80% 80–90% >90% Kennedy: 40–50% 50–60% 60–70% 70–80% 80–90% >90% Tie: 40–50% 50% No votes
U.S. senator before election
Mark Dayton
Democratic (DFL)
Elected U.S. Senator
Amy Klobuchar
Democratic (DFL)

The 2006 United States Senate election in Minnesota took place on November 7, 2006. Incumbent Senator Mark Dayton announced in February 2005 that he would retire instead of seeking a second term. Fellow Democrat Amy Klobuchar won the open seat by 20.1 percentage points. Primary elections took place on September 12, 2006.

== DFL primary ==
=== Candidates ===
- Amy Klobuchar, Hennepin County attorney
- Darryl Stanton, businessman

==== Withdrew ====
- Patty Wetterling, children's safety advocate and candidate for U.S. House in 2004

=== Campaign ===
Klobuchar gained the early endorsement of the majority of DFL state legislators in Minnesota. A poll taken of DFL state delegates showed Klobuchar beating her then closest opponent, Patty Wetterling, 66% to 15%. As of June 30, 2005, Klobuchar had more cash on hand than any other candidate, nearly $1,100,000.

Klobuchar was endorsed by EMILY's List on September 29, 2005. On January 20, 2006, Wetterling dropped out of the race and endorsed Klobuchar.

Former Senate candidate and prominent lawyer Mike Ciresi, who was widely seen as the only other serious potential DFL candidate, indicated on February 7, 2006, that he would not enter the race. That removal of her most significant potential competitor for the DFL nomination was viewed as an important boost for Klobuchar.

The only other serious candidate for the DFL endorsement was veterinarian Ford Bell. Bell, a staunch liberal, ran on a platform of implementing single-payer healthcare and immediate withdrawal from Iraq. Klobuchar won the official DFL endorsement on June 9, 2006. Bell dropped out of the race on July 10, citing inability to compete financially, and also endorsed Klobuchar.

=== Results ===
Minnesota Democratic–Farmer–Labor Party primary results
Party	Candidate	Votes	%
Democratic (DFL)	Amy Klobuchar	294,671	92.51
Democratic (DFL)	Darryl Stanton	23,872	7.49
Total votes		318,543	100.00

== Republican primary ==
=== Candidates ===
- Mark Kennedy, U.S. representative from Minnesota's 6th congressional district
- Harold Shudlick, military veteran
- John Ulrich, military veteran

=== Campaign ===
Kennedy had faced potential challenges from former U.S. Senator Rod Grams, as well as U.S. Representative Gil Gutknecht, but both men were persuaded by national GOP leaders to run for the House instead. (Grams lost to Representative Jim Oberstar, while Gutknecht lost his reelection bid to Tim Walz.)

=== Results ===
Republican primary results
Party	Candidate	Votes	%
Republican	Mark Kennedy	147,091	90.21
Republican	John Uldrich	10,025	6.15
Republican	Harold Shudlick	5,941	3.64
Total votes		163,057	100.00

== Independence primary ==
=== Candidates ===
- Miles W. Collins
- Robert Fitzgerald, public-access television executive
- Stephen Williams, salesman

=== Results ===
Independence primary results
Party	Candidate	Votes	%
Independence	Robert Fitzgerald	5,520	51.61
Independence	Miles W. Collins	2,600	24.31
Independence	Stephen Williams	2,575	24.08
Total votes		10,695	100.00

== General election ==
=== Candidates ===
==== Major ====
- Robert Fitzgerald (IPM), public-access television cable TV show director
- Mark Kennedy (R), U.S. congressman
- Amy Klobuchar (D), Hennepin County attorney

==== Minor ====
- Michael Cavlan (G), nurse and independent journalist
- Peter Idusogie (I), businessman (write-in)
- Ben Powers (C), quality control technician

=== Campaign ===
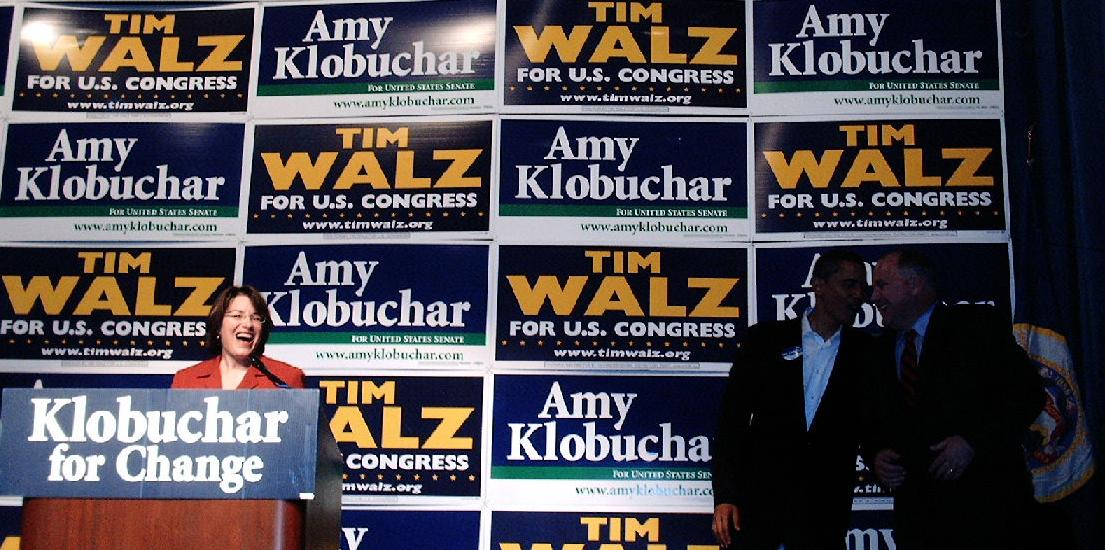
Klobuchar with Barack Obama and Tim Walz

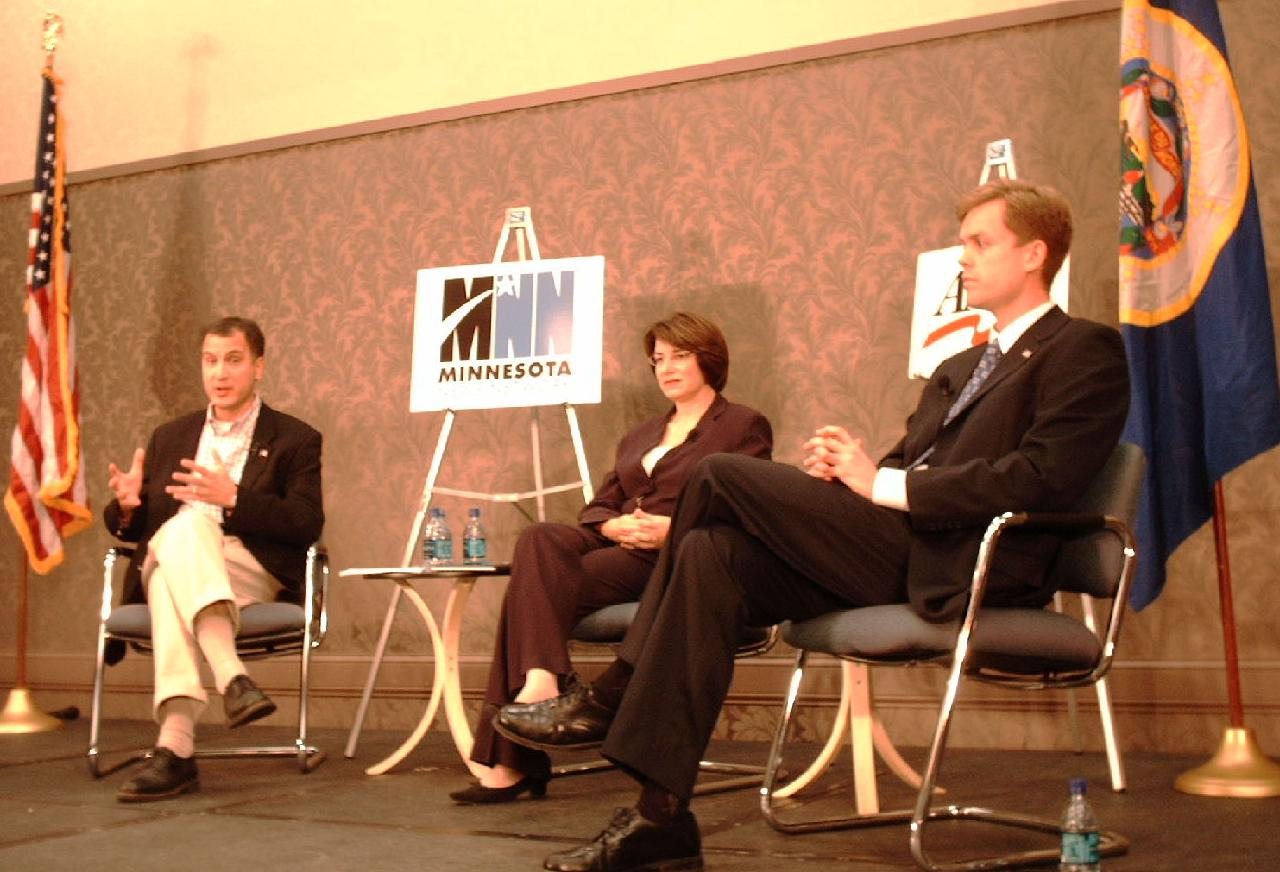
Major party candidates: Kennedy, Klobuchar, and Fitzgerald

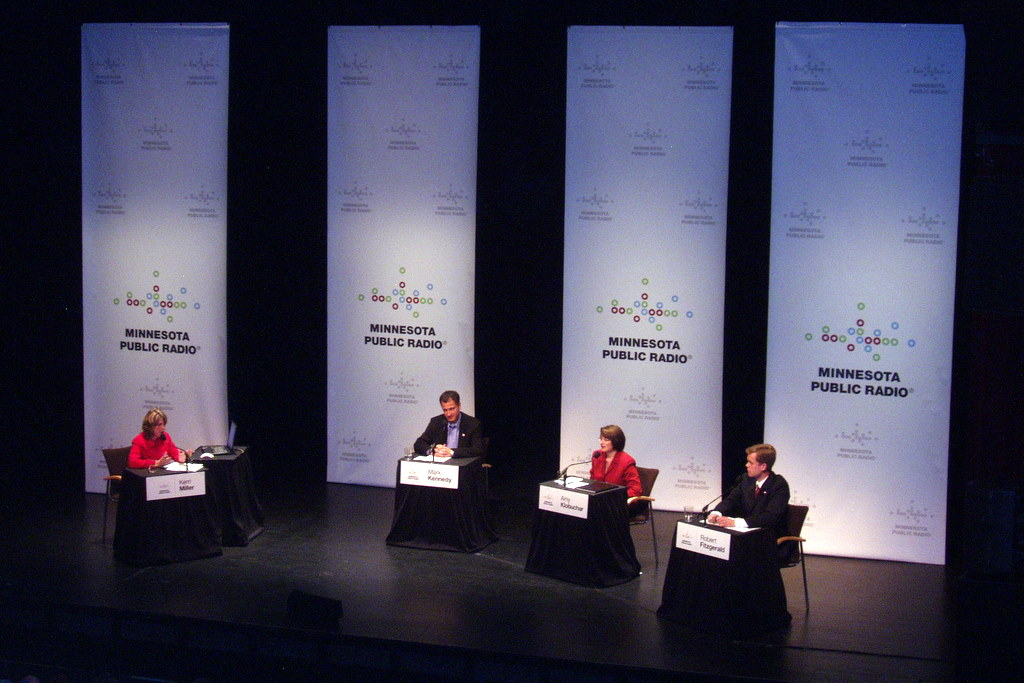
Candidates Mark Kennedy, Amy Klobuchar, and Robert Fitzgerald debated on November 5, 2006.

Kennedy's routine support of President George W. Bush in House votes appeared to be a central issue for Democrats in the campaign. In June 2006, allegations were made that many references to and photos of Bush had been removed from Kennedy's official U.S. House website. In rebuttal, Republicans said that there were 72 references to Bush on the website and that the changes noted by critics had been made some time ago, as part of the normal updating process. Ben Powers was the only ballot-qualified candidate not invited to appear on Minnesota Public Television's Almanac program, despite Powers's offer to fill the space left unfilled by Klobuchar's decision not to appear with Kennedy and Fitzgerald on the program. Green candidate Michael Cavlan appeared on the program twice during the campaign as a special guest.

=== Debates ===
- Complete video of debate, September 19, 2006
- Complete video of debate, October 15, 2006
- Complete video of debate, October 29, 2006

=== Predictions ===
Source	Ranking	As of
The Cook Political Report	Likely D	November 6, 2006
Sabato's Crystal Ball	Likely D	November 6, 2006
Rothenberg Political Report	Safe D	November 6, 2006
Real Clear Politics	Lean D	November 6, 2006

=== Polling ===
After the release of the Star Tribune poll on September 17, 2006, showing Klobuchar ahead by 24%, Kennedy's campaign issued a statement from Joe Pally, the campaign's communications director. He claimed that the margin was exaggerated because of bias by the Star Tribune and that the poll was "clearly more about discouraging Kennedy supporters than on reflecting the true status of one of the most closely contested Senate races in the country." This press release came in the wake of news that the Republican party was scaling back funding for Kennedy's election campaign to shore up campaigns in states seen as winnable. Kennedy's campaign frequently accused the Star Tribune of bias in favor of Klobuchar, whose father was an editorial columnist and sportswriter for the paper until his retirement. A subsequent poll by Rasmussen Reports showed a similar lead for Klobuchar, and the St. Paul Pioneer Press also showed Klobuchar with a 15% lead in September. Klobuchar won the November 7 election by more than 20 percentage points.

Source	Date	Klobuchar (DFL)	Kennedy (R)	Fitzgerald (IPM)
Rasmussen	December 23, 2005	48%	41%	
Rasmussen	January 28, 2006	43%	42%	
Rasmussen	February 28, 2006	45%	42%	
Zogby/WSJ	March 31, 2006	49%	41%	
Greenberg Quinlan Rosner Poll	May 9, 2006	50%	42%	
Rasmussen	May 10, 2006	45%	43%	
Zogby/WSJ	June 21, 2006	49%	41%	
Rasmussen	June 30, 2006	47%	44%	
''Minneapolis-St. Paul Star Tribune'' Minnesota Poll	July 16, 2006	50%	31%	
Zogby/WSJ	July 24, 2006	49%	43%	
Bennett, Petts, and Blumenthal (D)	July 24, 2006	48%	30%	
SurveyUSA	July 24, 2006	47%	42%	8%
Rasmussen	August 7, 2006	50%	38%	5%
Zogby/WSJ	August 28, 2006	50%	42%	
Rasmussen	August 28, 2006	47%	40%	8%
Gallup	September 5, 2006	50%	40%	
Zogby/WSJ	September 11, 2006	49%	40%	
''Minneapolis-St. Paul Star Tribune'' Minnesota Poll	September 17, 2006	56%	32%	3%
University of Minnesota Humphrey Institute	September 21, 2006	52%	36%	7%
Minnesota Public Radio/Pioneer Press/Mason-Dixon	September 25, 2006	52%	37%	1%
SurveyUSA	September 28, 2006	51%	43%	2%
Rasmussen	October 4, 2006	53%	36%	6%
''Minneapolis-St. Paul Star Tribune'' Minnesota Poll	October 15, 2006	55%	34%	3%
Zogby/WSJ	October 19, 2006	50%	43%	
SurveyUSA	October 24, 2006	55%	39%	3%
Rasmussen	October 25, 2006	54%	39%	
University of Minnesota Humphrey Institute	November 1, 2006	55%	33%	3%
''Minneapolis-St. Paul Star Tribune'' Minnesota Poll	November 4, 2006	54%	34%	4%
SurveyUSA	November 6, 2006	56%	40%	2%

=== Endorsements ===
Amy Klobuchar (DFL)

Individuals

- Wesley Clark, general, 2004 Democratic presidential candidate

Organizations

- National Women's Political Caucus

=== Results ===
The race was, as expected, not close, with Klobuchar winning decisively. She did well in major cities, such as Minneapolis and St. Paul, while Kennedy did well only in smaller, less populated counties. The turnout was high, although not unusual for Minnesota, one of the highest voter turnout states. Official turnout came in at 70.64%.

General election results
Party	Candidate	Votes	%	±%
Democratic (DFL)	Amy Klobuchar	1,278,849	58.06%	+9.23%
Republican	Mark Kennedy	835,653	37.94%	−5.35%
Independence	Robert Fitzgerald	71,194	3.23%	−2.58%
Green	Michael Cavlan	10,714	0.49%	n/a
Constitution	Ben Powers	5,408	0.25%	+0.15%
Write-ins		954		
Majority		443,196	20.2%	
Turnout		2,202,772	70.64%	
Democratic (DFL) hold		Swing		

==== Counties that flipped from Republican to Democratic ====
- Morrison (largest city: Little Falls)
- Todd (largest city: Long Prairie)
- Faribault (largest city: Blue Earth)
- Nobles (largest city: Worthington)
- Martin (largest city: Fairmont)
- Cottonwood (largest city: Windom)
- Dodge (largest city: Kasson)
- Murray (largest city: Slayton)
- Brown (largest city: New Ulm)
- McLeod (largest city: Hutchinson)
- Meeker (largest city: Litchfield)
- Sibley (largest city: Gaylord)
- Benton (largest city: Sauk Rapids)
- Isanti (largest city: Cambridge)
- Chisago (largest city: North Branch)
- Mille Lacs (largest city: Princeton)
- Kanabec (largest city: Mora)
- Lake of the Woods (largest city: Baudette)
- Roseau (largest city: Roseau)
- Clearwater (largest city: Bagley)
- Becker (largest city: Detroit Lakes)
- Douglas (largest city: Alexandria)
- Cass (largest city: Lake Shore)
- Crow Wing (largest city: Brainerd)
- Hubbard (largest city: Park Rapids)
- Stearns (largest city: St. Cloud)
- Wilkin, (largest city: Breckenridge)
- Houston (largest city: La Crescent)
- Anoka (largest city: Blaine)
- Dakota (largest city: Hastings)
- Scott (largest city: Shakopee)
- Washington (largest city: Stillwater)
- Carver (largest city: Chaska)
- Wabasha (largest city: Lake City)
- Goodhue (largest city: Red Wing)
- Le Sueur (largest city: Le Sueur)
- Waseca (largest city: Waseca)
- Steele (largest city: Owatonna)
- Olmsted (largest city: Rochester)

== See also ==
- 2008 United States Senate election in Minnesota
- 2006 United States Senate elections
- 2006 Minnesota gubernatorial election
