= Rod Grams =

American politician (1948–2013)

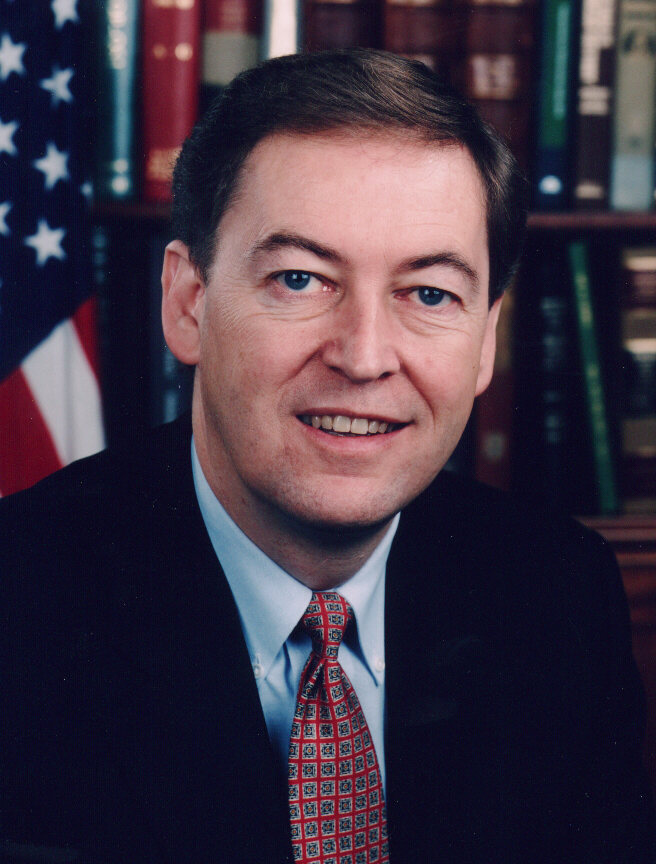

United States Senator from Minnesota
- In office January 3, 1995 – January 3, 2001
- Preceded by: David Durenberger
- Succeeded by: Mark Dayton

Member of the U.S. House of Representatives from Minnesota's 6th district
- In office January 3, 1993 – January 3, 1995
- Preceded by: Gerry Sikorski
- Succeeded by: Bill Luther

Personal details
- Born: Rodney Dwight Grams; February 4, 1948 Princeton, Minnesota, U.S.
- Died: October 8, 2013 (aged 65) Crown, Minnesota, U.S.
- Party: Republican
- Spouse: Christine Gunhus
- Education: Brown College; Anoka-Ramsey Community College; Carroll University
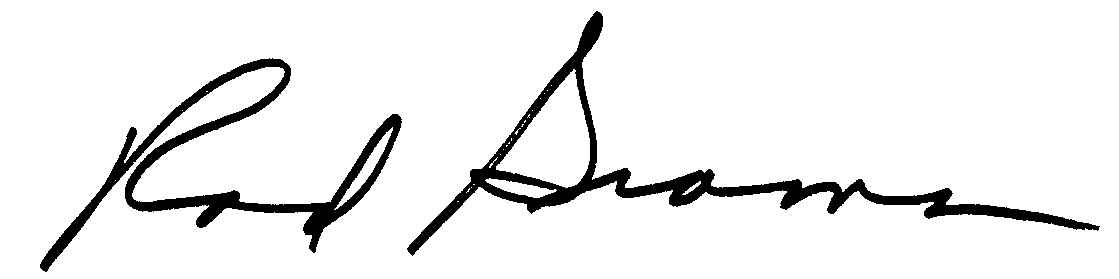
- Signature

Rodney Dwight Grams (February 4, 1948 – October 8, 2013) was an American politician and television news anchor who served in both the United States House of Representatives and the U.S. Senate. A local news anchor, Grams became well known for working at Twin Cities station KMSP-TV from 1982 until 1991. He was a member of the Republican Party.

Grams was born on a farm in Princeton, Minnesota, and worked at several other news stations throughout the Midwest and Great Plains before serving as KMSP's senior news anchor. After retiring from television, he launched a successful bid for Congress in Minnesota's 6th congressional district against embattled Democratic incumbent Gerry Sikorski in 1992. He served one term, opting to run for the U.S. Senate seat being vacated by retiring Republican David Durenberger in 1994. He won the 1994 Senate election and was defeated for reelection by Mark Dayton in 2000.

Grams sought election to his old Senate seat in 2006, but dropped out before the Republican primary. He also ran again for election to the House in Minnesota's 8th congressional district in 2006 as the Republican-endorsed candidate but lost to the incumbent Democratic candidate Jim Oberstar.

== Early life ==
Grams was born on a farm in Princeton, Minnesota. He attended Brown Institute (1966–1968), Anoka-Ramsey Community College (1970–1972), and Carroll College (1974–1975).

Grams spent 23 years in television and radio broadcasting before launching a career in politics. From 1982 to 1991 he was the senior news anchor at KMSP-TV in Minneapolis/St. Paul. Before that, he worked as a news anchor/producer for KFBB-TV in Great Falls, Montana; WSAU-TV in Wausau, Wisconsin; and WIFR-TV in Rockford, Illinois. Before entering broadcasting, Grams worked at an engineering consulting firm for seven years. In 1985, he formed Sun Ridge Builders, a Twin Cities construction and residential development company, serving as its president and CEO. He was involved in architectural design and the use of solar energy in residential homes.

== Early political career ==
Grams launched his political career by winning the 1992 Republican nomination in Minnesota's 6th congressional district. He defeated the Democratic incumbent Gerry Sikorski in the general election. During the campaign, Grams benefited from high name recognition in the district—from years as news anchor at KMSP-TV—and Sikorski's involvement in the House banking scandal. He served in the 103rd Congress as a member of the House of Representatives, and in the 104th, 105th, and 106th congresses as a member of the U.S. Senate.

== U.S. Senate ==
After David Durenberger announced he would not seek reelection, Grams surprised many by announcing, just months into his term in the U.S. House, that he would run for the Senate. Grams faced opposition from Gen Olson, a member of the Minnesota Senate, Bert McKasy, who was Durenberger's former chief of staff, and Doug McFarland, a law professor. During the party endorsement process, the Grams campaign closely aligned itself with supporters of Allen Quist, who was challenging incumbent Governor Arne Carlson for reelection in the 1994 gubernatorial race. Weeks before the state Republican convention, McFarland dropped out of the Senate race after endorsing Quist for governor and joining his ticket as Quist's running mate.

After numerous ballots at the convention in St. Paul, Grams won the Republican endorsement over Olson and McKasy. He also won the Republican primary against Arne Carlson's Lieutenant Governor Joanell Dyrstad, who had been replaced as his running mate by Joanne Benson, a member of the Minnesota Senate. In the general election against Democratic Farmer Labor candidate Ann Wynia and Independence Party candidate Dean Barkley, Grams won, 49% to 44%.

Grams ran for reelection in 2000, losing to Mark Dayton. During the campaign, Grams's wife Christine Gunhus was revealed to have written anonymous disparaging emails about Grams's potential Democratic rival Mike Ciresi from her home computer. She received a fine and suspended sentence for violating political advertising regulations. The Grams campaign also ran a commercial during the campaign featuring Grams's mother, Audrey Grams, that ended with her saying, "Uffda, vote for Rod."

== Post-Senate career ==
After his 2000 reelection defeat, Grams went back into private business and in 2004 became the owner of three radio stations in Little Falls, Minnesota. He attempted a political comeback in the 2006 U.S. Senate campaign. He sought the GOP nomination for his former Senate seat, facing Mark Kennedy and Gil Gutknecht. After a poor showing early in the endorsement process, Grams dropped his Senate candidacy and ran in the 2006 U.S. House election, challenging the incumbent Jim Oberstar in Minnesota's 8th congressional district. Oberstar defeated Grams handily.

Grams remained active in politics and interested in running for public office. In 2008, he considered challenging incumbent Norm Coleman for the Republican U.S. Senate nomination but was too busy in his private life to make a run, saying, "And my wife (Chris) would have killed me if I would have, because of some things that we're doing." It also became unclear whether Grams would run as a Republican. In an interview, he expressed disappointment at the perceived failings of the party, going as far as to wonder whether he could still call himself a Republican or vote for Republican candidates. He opposed 2008 Minnesota Amendment 1, believing it gave more power to special interest groups and would not have any serious consequences for culture or on the environment.

Grams considered a 2010 run for governor of Minnesota, saying, "I'm so damn unhappy with the Republicans right now ... I'm so unhappy with the candidates that we have I could puke. I wanted to get out there and mix it up." But Grams endorsed Republican Tom Emmer in the 2010 campaign for governor. Emmer lost the election to Mark Dayton.

== Illness and death ==
On September 4, 2013, it was announced that Grams had been battling colon cancer since 2012 and was receiving hospice care at his home. He died on October 8, 2013, aged 65, at his home in Crown, Minnesota.

== Electoral history ==
Minnesota 8th Congressional District Election 2006
| Party | Candidate | Votes | % | ±% |
|---|---|---|---|---|
| Democratic | Jim Oberstar (incumbent) | 180,670 | 63.61 | |
| Republican | Rod Grams | 97,683 | 34.39 | |

Minnesota U.S. Senate Election 2000
| Party | Candidate | Votes | % | ±% |
|---|---|---|---|---|
| Democratic | Mark Dayton | 1,181,553 | 48.83 | |
| Republican | Rod Grams (incumbent) | 1,047,474 | 43.29 | |
| Independence | Jim Gibson | 140,583 | 5.81 | |

Minnesota U.S. Senate Election 1994
| Party | Candidate | Votes | % | ±% |
|---|---|---|---|---|
| Republican | Rod Grams | 869,653 | 49.05 | |
| Democratic | Ann Wynia | 781,860 | 44.10 | |
| Independence | Dean Barkley | 95,400 | 5.38 | |

Minnesota U.S. Senate Election 1994 - Republican Primary
| Party | Candidate | Votes | % | ±% |
|---|---|---|---|---|
| Republican | Rod Grams | 269,931 | 58.17 | |
| Republican | Joanell Dyrstad | 163,205 | 35.17 | |
| Republican | Harold Stassen | 22,430 | 4.83 | |

Minnesota 6th Congressional District Election 1992
| Party | Candidate | Votes | % | ±% |
|---|---|---|---|---|
| Republican | Rod Grams | 133,564 | 44.37 | |
| Democratic | Gerry Sikorski (incumbent) | 100,016 | 33.23 | |
| Reform | Dean Barkley | 48,329 | 16.06 | |

Minnesota 6th Congressional District Election 1992 - Republican Primary
| Party | Candidate | Votes | % | ±% |
|---|---|---|---|---|
| Republican | Rod Grams | 11,818 | 68.62 | |
| Republican | Jim Hillegass | 5,404 | 31.38 | |

Party political offices
| Preceded by David Durenberger | Republican nominee for U.S. Senator from Minnesota (Class 1); 1994, 2000 | Succeeded by Mark Kennedy |
U.S. House of Representatives
| Preceded by Gerry Sikorski | Member of the U.S. House of Representatives from Minnesota's 6th congressional district 1993–1995 | Succeeded by Bill Luther |
U.S. Senate
| Preceded by David Durenberger | U.S. senator (Class 1) from Minnesota; 1995–2001; Served alongside: Paul Wellstone | Succeeded by Mark Dayton |
