= 2000 United States Senate election in Minnesota =

- November 7, 2000
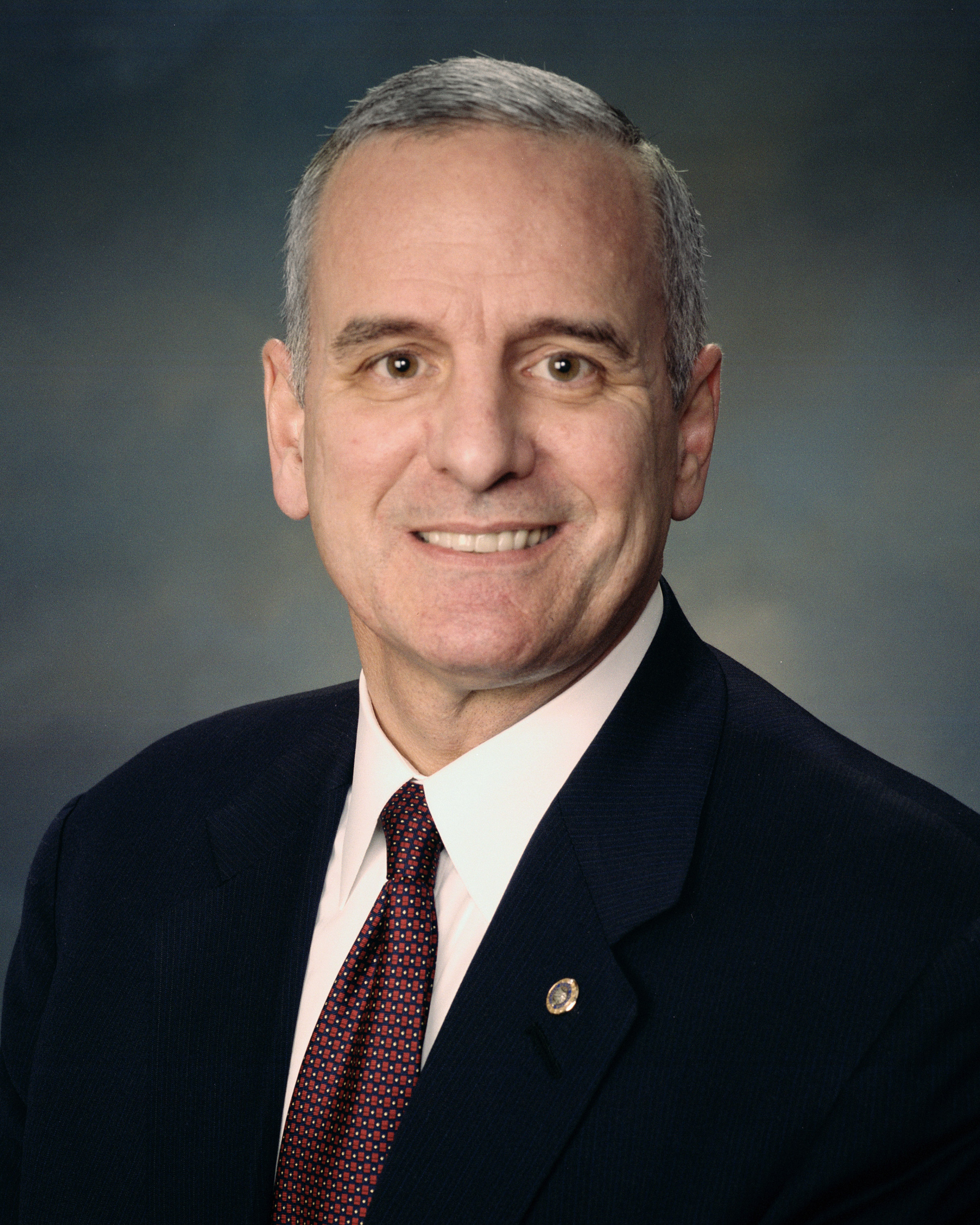

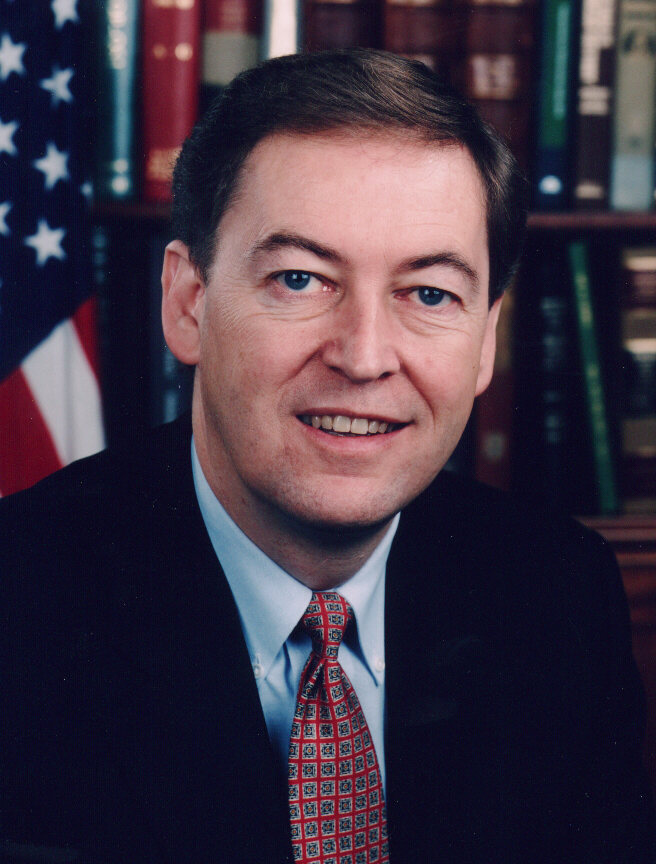

Nominee	Mark Dayton	Rod Grams	James Gibson
Party	Democratic (DFL)	Republican	Independence
Popular vote	1,181,553	1,047,474	140,583
Percentage	48.83%	43.29%	5.81%
- Dayton: 30–40% 40–50% 50–60% 60–70% 70–80% 80–90% >90% Grams: 40–50% 50–60% 60–70% 70–80% 80–90% >90% Tie: 40–50% 50% No votes
U.S. senator before election
Rod Grams
Republican
Elected U.S. Senator
Mark Dayton
Democratic (DFL)

The 2000 United States Senate election in Minnesota was held on November 7, 2000. Republican incumbent Rod Grams ran for a second consecutive term in office, but he was defeated by former Minnesota state auditor Mark Dayton.

Upon Dayton's swearing in, the Democratic Party held both of Minnesota's Senate seats for the first time since 1978.

== DFL primary ==
- Mark Dayton, former Minnesota state auditor and nominee for Senate in 1982
- Michael V. Ciresi, attorney
- Jerry Janezich, state senator
- Rebecca Yanisch
- Richard "Dick" Franson, city councilman
- Oloveuse S. "Ole" Savior, artist and perennial candidate.
- Gregg A. Iverson

=== Results ===
Minnesota Democratic–Farmer–Labor Party primary results
Party	Candidate	Votes	%
Democratic (DFL)	Mark Dayton	178,972	41.30
Democratic (DFL)	Mike Ciresi	96,874	22.35
Democratic (DFL)	Jerry Janezich	90,074	20.78
Democratic (DFL)	Rebecca Yanisch	63,289	14.60
Democratic (DFL)	Richard Franson	1,336	0.31
Democratic (DFL)	Oloveuse S. Savior	1,206	0.28
Democratic (DFL)	Gregg A. Iverson	1,038	0.24
Total votes		462,789	100.00

== Republican primary ==
=== Candidate ===
- Rod Grams, incumbent U.S. Senator
- William Paul "Bill" Dahn

=== Results ===
Republican primary results
Party	Candidate	Votes	%
Republican	Rod Grams (incumbent)	112,335	89.11
Republican	William Paul Dahn	13,728	10.89
Total votes		126,063	100.00

== General election ==
=== Candidates ===
- David Daniels (Grassroots)
- Mark Dayton, former Minnesota state auditor and 1982 nominee for Senate (DFL)
- Rebecca Ellis (Socialist Workers)
- James Gibson (Independence)
- Rod Grams, incumbent U.S. senator since 1995 (Republican)
- Erik Pakieser (Libertarian)
- Ole Savior, perennial candidate (Independent; write-in)
- David Swan (Constitution)

=== Debates ===
2000 United States Senate election in Minnesota debates
No.	Date	Host	Moderator	Link	Republican	Democratic	Independence	Constitution
Key: P Participant A Absent N Not invited I Invited W Withdrawn								
Key: P Participant A Absent N Not invited I Invited W Withdrawn					Rod Grams	Mark Dayton	James Gibson	David Swan
1	Oct. 18, 2000	KARE-TV	Paul Majors; Tim Russert	C-SPAN	P	P	P	N
2	Oct. 26, 2000	WCCO-TV	Don Shelby	C-SPAN	P	P	P	P
3	Nov. 3, 2000	KTCA-TV; Minnesota Citizen's Forum; Star Tribune; Twin Cities Public Television; WCCO	Eric Eskola; Cathy Wurzer	C-SPAN	P	P	P	N

=== Polling ===
Poll source	Date(s)	Sample size	Margin of error	Rod Grams (R)	Mark Dayton (D)	Jim Gibson (IP)	Other / undecided (Note: Calculated by taking the difference of 100% and all other candidates combined.)
Harris Insights & Analytics	November 3, 2000	3,793	—	40%	50%	1%	9%
Minneapolis Star Tribune	November 2, 2000	900	—	37%	46%	5%	12%
Tarrance Group (R) (Note: Poll conducted for an unspecified Republican sponsor.)	November 1, 2000	450	—	43%	44%	6%	7%
Mason-Dixon Polling & Strategy	October 27, 2000	625	—	42%	47%	5%	6%
St. Cloud State University	October 19, 2000	514	—	33%	48%	6%	13%

=== Results ===
2000 United States Senate election in Minnesota
Party	Candidate	Votes	%	±%
Democratic (DFL)	Mark Dayton	1,181,553	48.83	+4.73
Republican	Rod Grams (incumbent)	1,047,474	43.29	−5.76
Independence	James Gibson	140,583	5.81	+0.43
Grassroots	David Daniels	21,447	0.89	−0.01
Socialist Workers	Rebecca Ellis	12,956	0.54	+0.40
Constitution	David Swan	8,915	0.37	n/a
Libertarian	Erik D. Pakieser	6,588	0.27	n/a
Write-in	Ole Savior	4	0.00	n/a
Total votes		2,419,520	100.00	n/a
Democratic (DFL) gain from Republican				

==== Counties that flipped from Republican to Democratic ====
- Aitkin (largest city: Aitkin)
- Big Stone (largest city: Ortonville)
- Grant (largest city: Elbow Lake)
- Lincoln (largest city: Tyler)
- Marshall (largest city: Warren)
- Pennington (largest city: Thief River Falls)
- Pine (largest city: Pine City)
- Polk (largest city: East Grand Forks)
- Pope (largest city: Glenwood)
- Red Lake (largest city: Red Lake Falls)
- Yellow Medicine (largest city: Granite Falls)
- Beltrami (largest city: Bemidji)
- Blue Earth (largest city: Mankato)
- Chippewa (largest city: Montevideo)
- Clay (largest city: Moorhead)
- Fillmore (largest city: Spring Valley)
- Freeborn (largest city: Albert Lea)
- Itasca (largest city: Grand Rapids)
- Koochiching (largest city: International Falls)
- Lac qui Parle (largest city: Madison)
- Mahnomen (largest city: Mahnomen)
- Nicollet (largest city: North Mankato)
- Rice (largest city: Faribault)
- Swift (largest city: Benson)
- Traverse (largest city: Wheaton)
- Winona (largest city: Winona)
- Kandiyohi (largest city: Willmar)
- Jackson (largest city: Jackson)
- Renville (largest city: Olivia)

== See also ==
- 2000 United States Senate elections
