= Gen Olson =

American politician (born 1938)

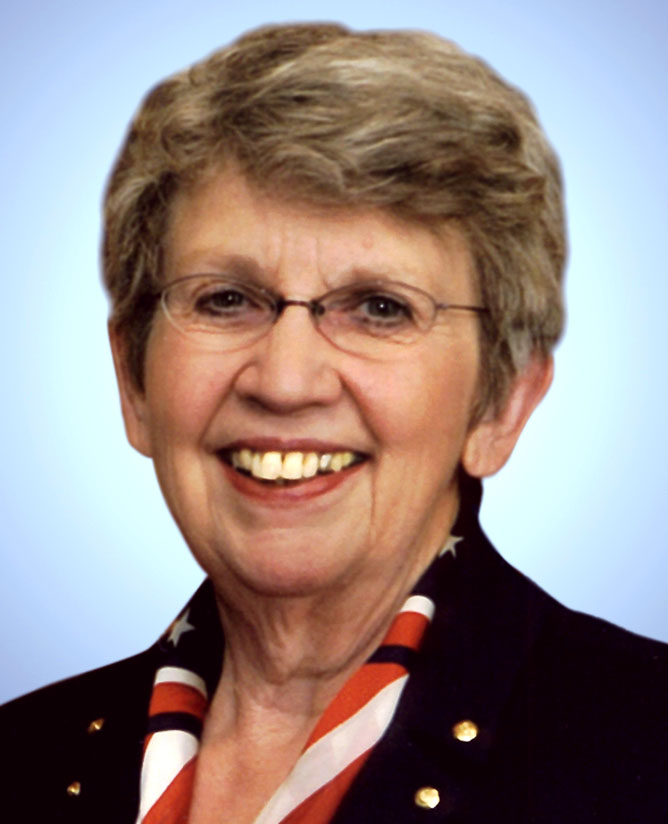

President pro tempore of the Minnesota Senate
- In office January 4, 2011 – January 7, 2013
- Preceded by: Dennis Frederickson
- Succeeded by: Ann Rest

Member of the Minnesota Senate from the 33rd district 43rd (1983-1993)
- In office January 4, 1983 – January 7, 2013
- Preceded by: George S. Pillsbury
- Succeeded by: David Osmek

Personal details
- Born: May 20, 1938 (age 88) Saint Paul, Minnesota, U.S.
- Party: Republican
- Education: Wheaton College; University of Minnesota

Gen Olson (born May 20, 1938) is a retired teacher and Republican politician who is a former member of the Minnesota Senate representing portions of Hennepin and Wright counties in the western Twin Cities metropolitan area. She was the Republican nominee for Lieutenant Governor of Minnesota in the 1998 Minnesota gubernatorial election and also unsuccessfully sought the Republican nomination in the 1994 United States Senate election in Minnesota.

She was first elected to the Senate in 1982, and was re-elected in all the way until her retirement 2010. She served as an assistant minority leader from 1989 to 1990 and president pro tempore from 2011 until 2013.

== Early life and career ==
Olson graduated from Minnehaha Academy High School, then attended Wheaton College in Wheaton, Illinois from 1955 to 1956 before going on to the University of Minnesota, from which she graduated with honors in 1959 with a B.S.Ed. degree. She was a teacher at Annandale High School in Annandale and Osseo High School in Osseo from 1959 to 1966. She earned her Ed.D. from the University of Minnesota in 1990.

In addition to her professional work in vocational education administration, Olson has been active in public service for many years, working for the Minnesota Department of Education, and serving on the boards of several organizations and on various commissions in her home community of Minnetrista, where she was also a member of the city council from 1979 to 1981, and mayor from 1981 to 1983.

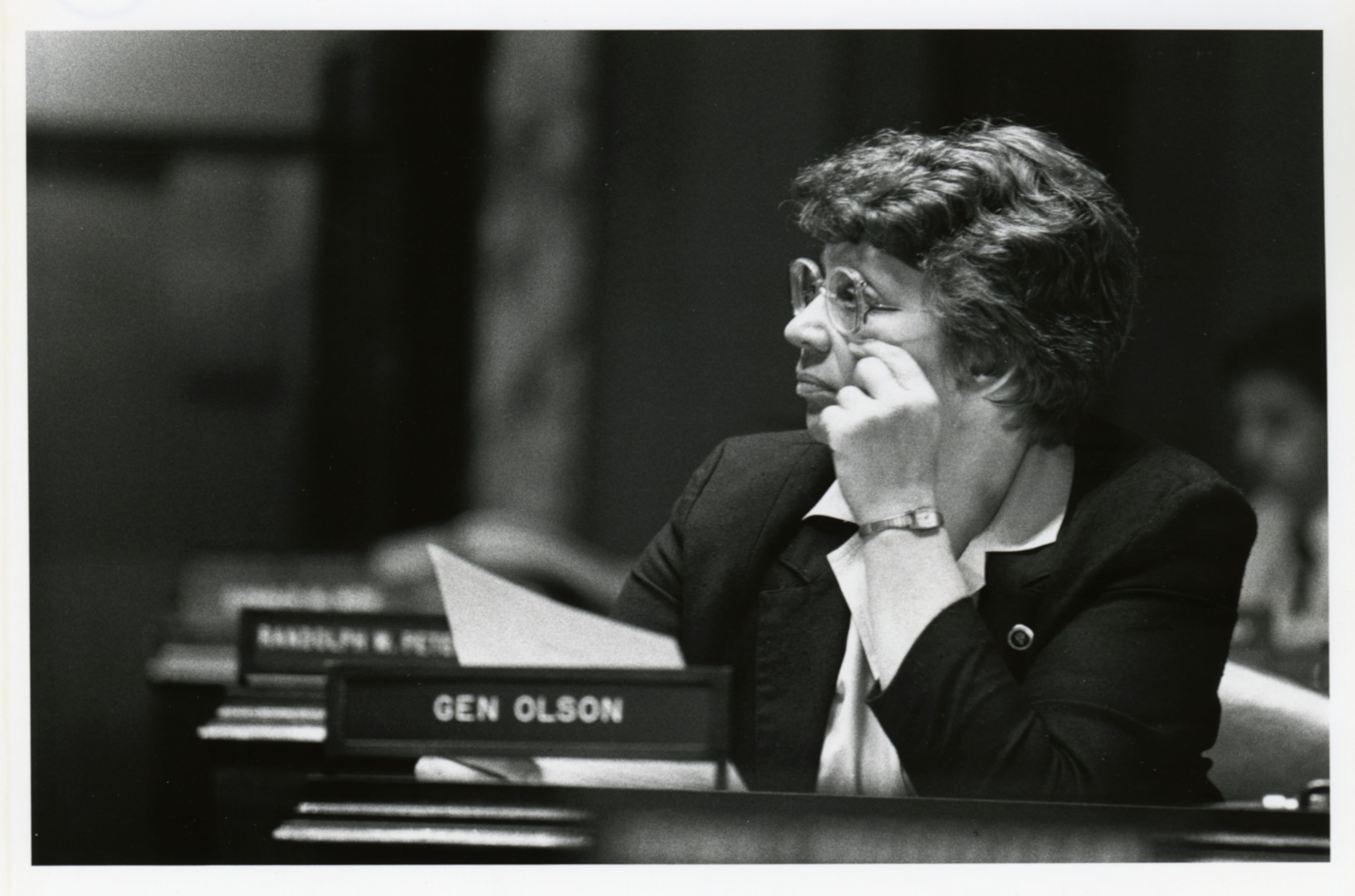
Senator Gen Olson listens to floor debate in the Senate Chamber, St. Paul, Minnesota.

Olson ran for the Republican endorsement for the U.S. Senate in 1994, but lost the nomination to future senator Rod Grams at the party's state convention. She was later Senator Norm Coleman's running mate when he ran for governor in 1998. They lost the general election to Jesse Ventura. She was a member of the Minnesota Statehood Sesquicentennial Commission from 2006 to 2008.

In 2007, Governor Tim Pawlenty appointed her as a member of the Minnesota delegation to the Education Commission of the States, an interstate compact created in 1965 to improve public education by facilitating the exchange of information, ideas and experiences among state policymakers and education leaders. The commission is headquartered in Denver, Colorado. The Minnesota delegation consists of seven members, including the Governor himself.

Olson served on the Senate's Education Committee (on which she is the ranking minority party member), the Environment and Natural Resources Committee, the Finance Committee, the Rules and Administration Committee, and the Transportation Committee. She also served on the Finance subcommittees for the E-12 Education Budget and Policy Division, for the Transportation Budget and Policy Division, and for the Transportation Budget and Policy Division-Transit Subdivision, and on the Rules and Administration Subcommittee for Committees.

Her special legislative concerns included education, property tax reform, cost of government, environment and natural resources, tax policy, agriculture, economic development, and local government.

Olson did not run for re-election in 2012.

Party political offices
Preceded by Joanne Benson	Republican nominee for Lieutenant Governor of Minnesota; 1998	Succeeded by Carol Molnau
