= Gerry Sikorski =

American politician and lawyer (born 1948)

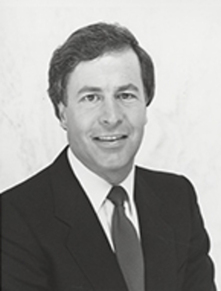

Member of the U.S. House of Representatives from Minnesota's 6th district
- In office January 3, 1983 – January 3, 1993
- Preceded by: Vin Weber
- Succeeded by: Rod Grams

Member of the Minnesota Senate from the 51st district
- In office January 4, 1977 – January 3, 1983
- Preceded by: Robert Brown
- Succeeded by: Donald Frank

Personal details
- Born: Gerald Edward Sikorski; April 26, 1948 (age 78) Breckenridge, Minnesota, U.S.
- Party: Democratic
- Education: University of Minnesota (BA, JD)

Gerald Edward Sikorski (born April 26, 1948) is an American politician, lobbyist, and lawyer from Minnesota. A member of the Democratic-Farmer-Labor Party, he served five terms as the U.S. representative for Minnesota's 6th congressional district, from 1983 to 1993.

== Biography ==
Sikorski graduated with a Bachelor of Arts degree summa cum laude from the University of Minnesota in 1970 and a Juris Doctor from the University of Minnesota Law School in 1973; he was admitted to the Minnesota bar in 1973 and commenced practice in Stillwater. He served in the Minnesota Senate from 1977 to 1982.

=== Congress ===
Sikorski first ran for Congress in 1978, losing to incumbent Arlen Erdahl. When reapportionment after the 1980 census moved Erdahl from Minnesota's 1st congressional district to the 6th district. Sikorski sought a rematch with Erdahl in 1982 and won, 51%–49%. This was Sikorski's closest election for Congress; he was reelected by margins of at least 20 points in 1984, 1986, 1988, and 1990.

During his time in Congress, Sikorski served as Whip-at-Large and as a member of the Committee on Energy and Commerce and the Committee on the Post Office and Civil Service.

Sikorski was defeated by television news anchor Rod Grams in 1992, garnering 33% of the vote in a four-way race. Earlier that year, Sikorski had been implicated in the House banking scandal; he was revealed to have had 697 overdrafts on the House Bank, which he attributed to his and his wife's sloppy bookkeeping.

=== Later career ===
After his departure from Congress, Sikorski became an attorney and lobbyist in Washington, D.C..

He is Polish American.

== Sources ==
- United States Congress. "Gerry Sikorski (id: S000407)". Biographical Directory of the United States Congress.
- Appearances on C-SPAN

U.S. House of Representatives
Preceded by Vin Weber	Member of the U.S. House of Representatives from Minnesota's 6th congressional district 1983–1993	Succeeded by Rod Grams
U.S. order of precedence (ceremonial)
Preceded by Alan Lowenthal as Former U.S. Representative	Order of precedence of the United States as Former U.S. Representative	Succeeded by Erik Paulsen as Former U.S. Representative
