= 1990 Minnesota State Auditor election =

- November 6, 1990

Nominee	Mark Dayton	Bob Heinrich
Party	Democratic (DFL)	Ind.-Republican
Popular vote	1,011,124	743,389
Percentage	57.63%	42.37%
- County results Dayton: 50–60% 60–70% 70–80% Heinrich: 50–60%
State Auditor before election
Arne Carlson
Ind.-Republican
Elected State Auditor
Mark Dayton
Democratic (DFL)

The 1990 Minnesota State Auditor election was held on November 6, 1990, in order to elect the State Auditor of Minnesota. Democratic–Farmer–Labor nominee Mark Dayton defeated Independent Republican nominee Bob Heinrich.

This would be the last election of which a male was elected State Auditor until 2026.

== General election ==
On election day, November 6, 1990, Democratic–Farmer–Labor nominee Mark Dayton won the election by a margin of 267,735 votes against his opponent Independent Republican nominee Bob Heinrich, thereby gaining Democratic–Farmer–Labor control over the office of state auditor. Dayton was sworn in as the 15th state auditor of Minnesota on January 3, 1991.

=== Results ===
Minnesota State Auditor election, 1990
Party	Candidate	Votes	%
Democratic (DFL)	Mark Dayton	1,011,124	57.63
Ind.-Republican	Bob Heinrich	743,389	42.37
Total votes		1,754,513	100.00
Democratic (DFL) gain from Ind.-Republican			
