= Michael V. Ciresi =

American lawyer

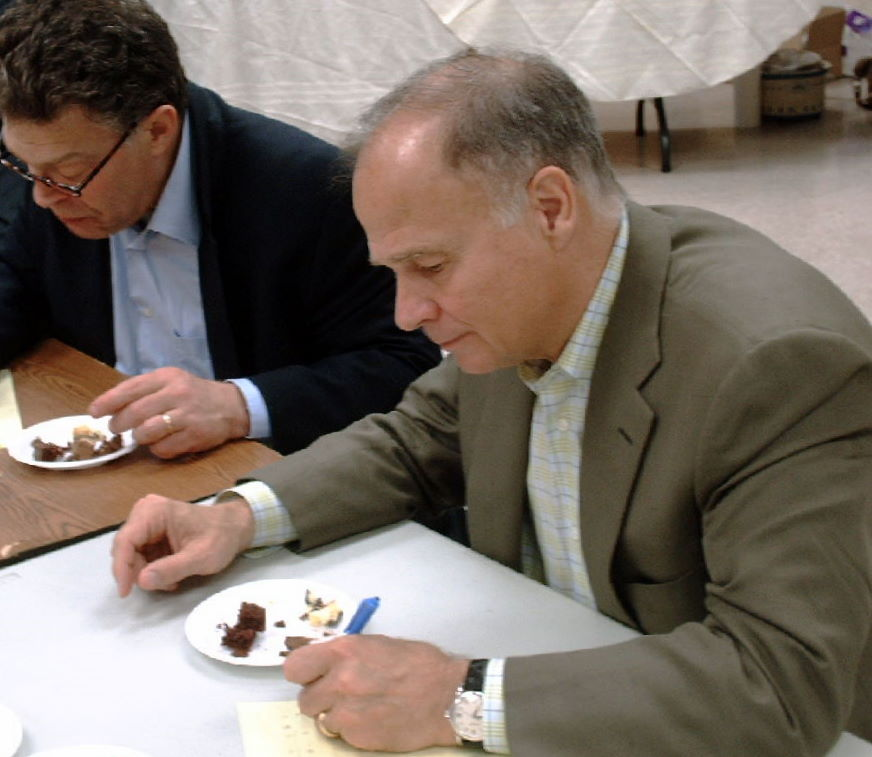
- Mike Ciresi in 2007
- Occupation: Lawyer
- Website: www.ciresiconlin.com/team/michael-ciresi/

Michael "Mike" V. Ciresi (/sərˈiːsi/ sər-EE-see) is a prominent trial attorney and was a Democratic-Farmer-Labor Party candidate for the United States Senate from Minnesota. He dropped out on March 10, 2008. Ciresi gained his public reputation by litigating several high-profile mass tort cases. Ciresi is the former chairman of the executive board of the Minneapolis firm Robins, Kaplan, Miller & Ciresi LLP, a 250-lawyer firm he joined in 1971. He left in 2015 to form his own firm.

== Role in Minnesota lawsuit against Big Tobacco ==
He was counsel to the State of Minnesota and Blue Cross and Blue Shield of Minnesota against the American tobacco industry, suing in 1994 as the second of eventually 46 states to join in the tobacco litigation. Ciresi's Minneapolis law firm, Robins, Kaplan, Miller & Ciresi, of which he was the chair, settled with the tobacco companies in 1998 with an agreement for the tobacco defendants to pay the state of Minnesota $6 billion. The law firm donated $30 million to the Minneapolis Foundation in 1998, a contribution made possible by the settlement fee; at the time, the gift was thought to be the largest contribution from a law firm to a community foundation. Ciresis has been on the board of trustees of his alma mater, the University of St. Thomas, and on the board of governors of the University of St. Thomas School of Law. He has served on the board of Regions Hospital Foundation and Minnesota Early Learning Foundation.

Ciresi's law firm was mentioned in the press for the legal fees collected in the 1998 tobacco settlement, variously reported as between $440 million and $558 million. The fees were to be paid over two years, in contrast to the 25-year annual payment scheme used to pay the plaintiffs of the case, the State of Minnesota. The fees were funded directly by tobacco companies.

As a result of the 1998 Minnesota tobacco settlement, Ciresi came to be known as a wealthy man and philanthropist, appearing regularly in the national and local press. According to Forbes magazine, with Ciresi among the highest-paid lawyers in the USA, "Cigarette money alone put these ten lawyers on the top-earning list—and it's likely to keep them there for the next 25 years." The magazine listed Ciresi's personal annual income at $14.4 million in 2000. Forbes speculated that Ciresi would use his newfound wealth and prominence to run for political office, which soon proved correct.

== Other famous cases ==
Ciresi served as counsel to the Government of India against Union Carbide over the Bhopal catastrophe. He was counsel to women rendered infertile by the Copper 7 IUD and to the families of women killed by the Dalkon Shield IUD.

== U.S. Senate run ==
Ciresi ran in the 2000 Senate primary for the Democratic-Farmer-Labor Party (DFL), spending several million dollars of his own money on the campaign. Ciresi ran as a self-described progressive moderate, and was endorsed by the Sierra Club and the Minnesota Nurses' Association. Ciresi was handily defeated by Mark Dayton, an heir to the founders of Target Corporation, in the four-way DFL primary. Dayton then came from behind in the polls to defeat first-term incumbent Republican Senator Rod Grams in the general election.

Dayton announced in early 2005 that he would not seek a second term. Although Ciresi indicated an interest in the race and registered the domain name ciresiforsenate.com within 48 hours of Dayton's announcement, he announced on February 7 that he would not seek the nomination. He would have faced Hennepin County district attorney Amy Klobuchar and Ford Bell in the DFL primary.

On April 18, 2007, Ciresi announced that he would seek the DFL endorsement] for the Senate seat held by Norm Coleman. Other Democrats in the race included author and satirist Al Franken, professor and author Jack Nelson-Pallmeyer, and Human Rights Activist Jim Cohen. On March 10, 2008, Ciresi announced his withdrawal from the primary.

On June 7, 2008, the Minnesota DFL endorsed Franken. Ciresi was widely reported on June 11 as saying he was "leaving all options on the table" when questioned about a possible primary run against Franken. But Ciresi eventually dropped out of the race without challenging Franken in the primary.
