= 1982 United States Senate election in Minnesota =

- November 2, 1982
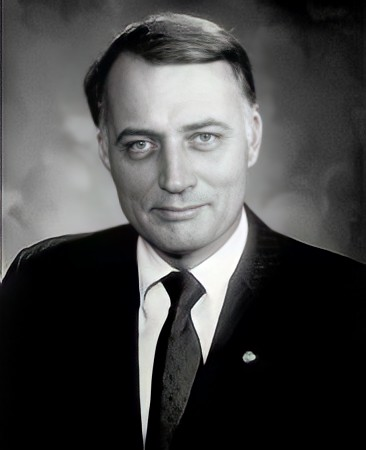

Nominee	David Durenberger	Mark Dayton
Party	Ind.-Republican	Democratic (DFL)
Popular vote	949,207	840,401
Percentage	52.60%	46.57%
- County results Durenberger: 40–50% 50–60% 60–70% Dayton: 50–60% 60–70%
U.S. senator before election
David Durenberger
Ind.-Republican
Elected U.S. Senator
David Durenberger
Ind.-Republican

The 1982 United States Senate election in Minnesota was held on November 2, 1982. Incumbent Republican U.S. Senator David Durenberger was reelected to a second term (his first full term) over DFL nominee Mark Dayton.

== Democratic–Farmer–Labor primary ==
=== Candidates ===
- William A. Branstner
- Mark Dayton, businessman
- Eugene McCarthy, former U.S. Senator
- Charles E. Pearson

=== Results ===
Democratic primary election results
Party	Candidate	Votes	%
Democratic (DFL)	Mark Dayton	359,014	69.06%
Democratic (DFL)	Eugene McCarthy	125,229	24.09%
Democratic (DFL)	Charles E. Pearson	19,855	3.82%
Democratic (DFL)	William A. Branstner	15,754	3.03%
Total votes		519,852	100.00%

== Independent-Republican primary ==
=== Candidate ===
- David Durenberger, incumbent U.S. Senator
- Mary Jane Rachner

=== Results ===
Republican primary election results
Party	Candidate	Votes	%
Ind.-Republican	David Durenberger (Incumbent)	287,651	94.38%
Ind.-Republican	Mary Jane Rachner	20,401	6.62%
Total votes		308,052	100.00%

== General election ==
=== Campaign ===
Dayton, 35, self-financed his campaign. Married to a Rockefeller and heir to a department store, his net worth was an estimated $30 million. Durenberger won the special election to finish the term of the late Hubert Humphrey. He was considered a moderate, but supported Reagan's tax cuts. Dayton ran against Reaganomics. He has also campaigned against tax breaks for the wealthy and even promised "to close tax loopholes for the rich and the corporations—and if you think that includes the Daytons, you're right." Dayton spent over $7 million, Durenberger over $4 million.

=== Results ===
General election results
Party	Candidate	Votes	%
Ind.-Republican	David Durenberger (Incumbent)	949,207	52.60%
Democratic (DFL)	Mark Dayton	840,401	46.57%
Socialist Workers	Bill Onasch	5,897	0.33%
Libertarian	Frederick Hewitt	5,870	0.33%
New Union Party	Jeffrey M. Miller	3,300	0.18%
Total votes		1,804,675	100.00%
Majority		108,806	6.03%
Turnout			67.65
Ind.-Republican hold			

== See also ==
- 1982 United States Senate elections
