= Minnesota Public Television Association =

Organization of public television stations in the state of Minnesota

The Minnesota Public Television Association (MPTA), also commonly known as Minnesota Public Television, is a not-for-profit trade organization of public television stations in the state of Minnesota. It operates an interconnecting statewide educational television network serving residents of Minnesota. The MPTA network is two-way; distributing programming to and from each member station. It also works to keep state funding for public television in the Minnesota budget.

Member stations include KSMQ in Austin, Lakeland PBS, serving Bemidji and Brainerd, Pioneer PBS serving Granite Falls and Worthington, Prairie Public serving Moorhead, East Grand Forks and Crookston, Twin Cities PBS serving Minneapolis-St. Paul, and PBS North serving Duluth and Hibbing.
