= 1994 United States Senate election in Minnesota =

- November 8, 1994
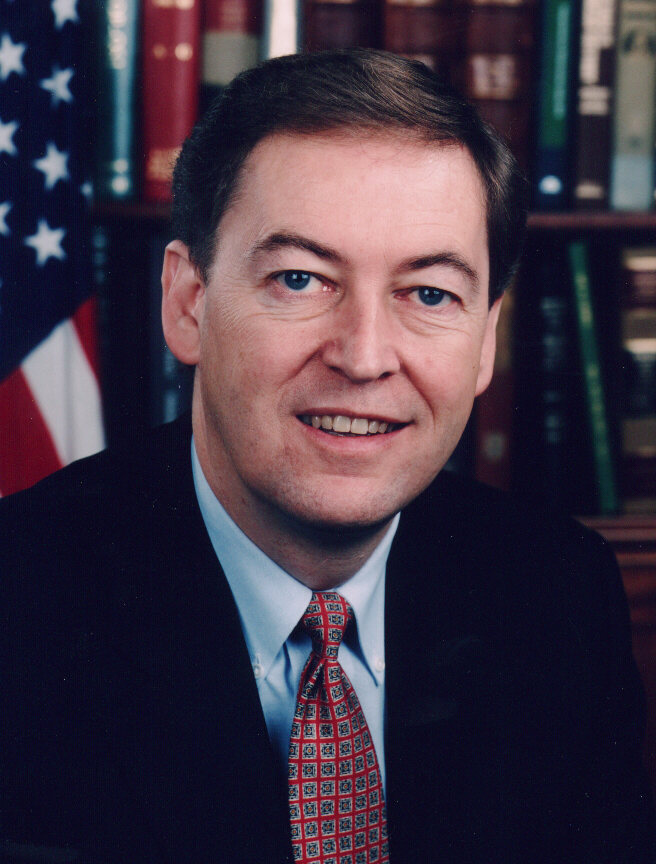

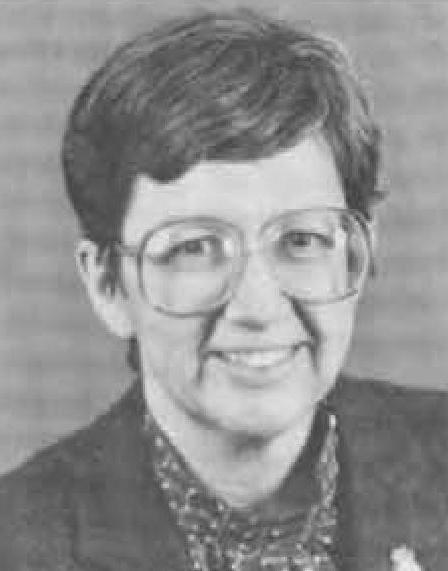

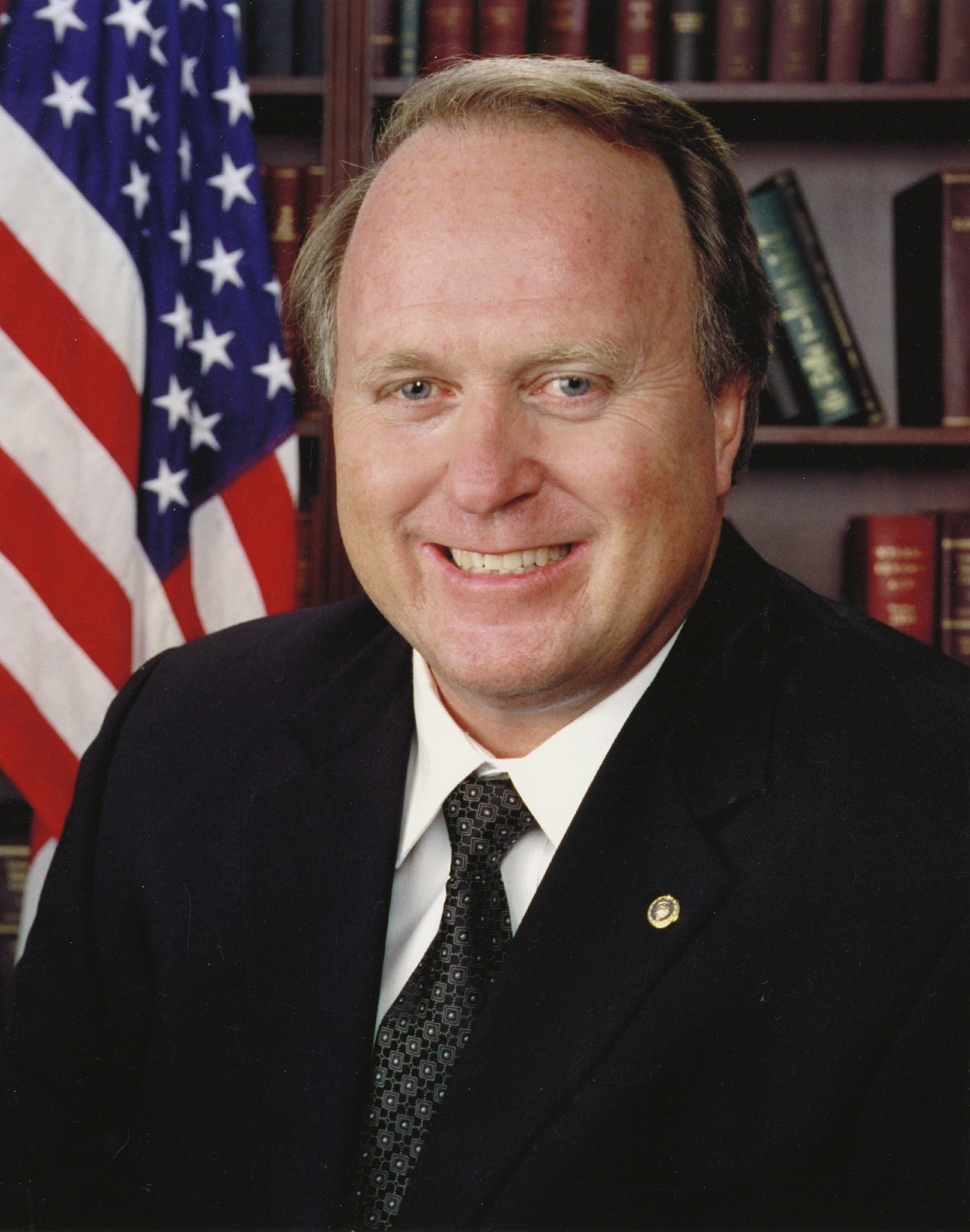
| Nominee | Rod Grams | Ann Wynia | Dean Barkley |
| Party | Ind.-Republican | Democratic (DFL) | Independence |
| Popular vote | 869,653 | 781,860 | 95,400 |
| Percentage | 49.05% | 44.10% | 5.38% |
- Grams: 30–40% 40–50% 50–60% 60–70% 70–80% 80–90% >90% Wynia: 40–50% 50–60% 60–70% 70–80% 80–90% >90% Other: 40–50% Tie: 30–40% 40–50% 50% No votes
U.S. senator before election
David Durenberger
Ind.-Republican
Elected U.S. Senator
Rod Grams
Ind.-Republican

The 1994 United States Senate election in Minnesota was held November 8, 1994. Incumbent Republican U.S. Senator David Durenberger decided to retire instead of seeking a fourth term. Republican Rod Grams won the open seat. As of 2024, this was the last time the Republicans won the Class 1 Senate seat from Minnesota.

== Primary elections ==
Primary elections were held on September 13, 1994.

=== Democratic primary ===
==== Candidates ====
- Ann Wynia, former Minnesota House Majority Leader (1987-1989)
- Tom Foley, Ramsey County Attorney and president of the Foley Law Group
- Buford Johnson, candidate for Minnesota's 6th congressional district in 1968
- Dick Franson, former Minneapolis City Council member (1963-1965) and perennial candidate
- Leonard J. Richards, perennial candidate
- Gary L. LeGare

==== Results ====
Democratic primary results
| Party | Candidate | Votes | % |
|---|---|---|---|
| Democratic | Ann Wynia | 236,476 | 61.64 |
| Democratic | Tom Foley | 126,756 | 33.04 |
| Democratic | Buford Johnson | 6,866 | 1.79 |
| Democratic | Dick Franson | 6,063 | 1.58 |
| Democratic | Leonard J. Richards | 4,146 | 1.08 |
| Democratic | Gary L. LeGare | 3,323 | 0.87 |
| Total votes | | 383,630 | |

=== Republican primary ===
==== Candidates ====
- Rod Grams, U.S. representative from Minnesota's 6th congressional district (1993-1995)
- Joanell M. Dyrstad, Lieutenant Governor of Minnesota (1991-1995)
- Harold Stassen, former Governor of Minnesota (1939-1943) and perennial candidate
- John J. Zeleniak

==== Results ====
Republican primary results
| Party | Candidate | Votes | % |
|---|---|---|---|
| Republican | Rod Grams | 269,931 | 58.17 |
| Republican | Joanell M. Dyrstad | 163,205 | 35.17 |
| Republican | Harold Stassen | 22,430 | 4.83 |
| Republican | John J. Zeleniak | 8,467 | 1.83 |
| Total votes | | 464,033 | |

== General election ==
=== Candidates ===
- Dean Barkley, attorney (Independence)
- Rod Grams, U.S. Representative from Anoka (Republican)
- Ann Wynia, former State Representative from St. Paul (Democratic-Farmer-Labor)

=== Results ===
1994 United States Senate election in Minnesota
| Party | Candidate | Votes | % |
|---|---|---|---|
| Ind.-Republican | Rod Grams | 869,653 | 49.05 |
| Democratic (DFL) | Ann Wynia | 781,860 | 44.10 |
| Independence | Dean Barkley | 95,400 | 5.38 |
| Independent | Candice E. Sjostrom | 15,920 | 0.90 |
| Natural Law | Stephen Johnson | 5,054 | 0.29 |
| Socialist Workers | Marea Himelgrin | 2,428 | 0.14 |
| No party | Write-ins | 2,614 | 0.15 |
| Majority | | 87,793 | 4.95 |
| Total votes | | 1,772,929 | 100.00 |
| Ind.-Republican hold | | | |

== See also ==
- 1994 United States Senate elections
