= Joanne Benson =

American politician

Joanne E. Benson
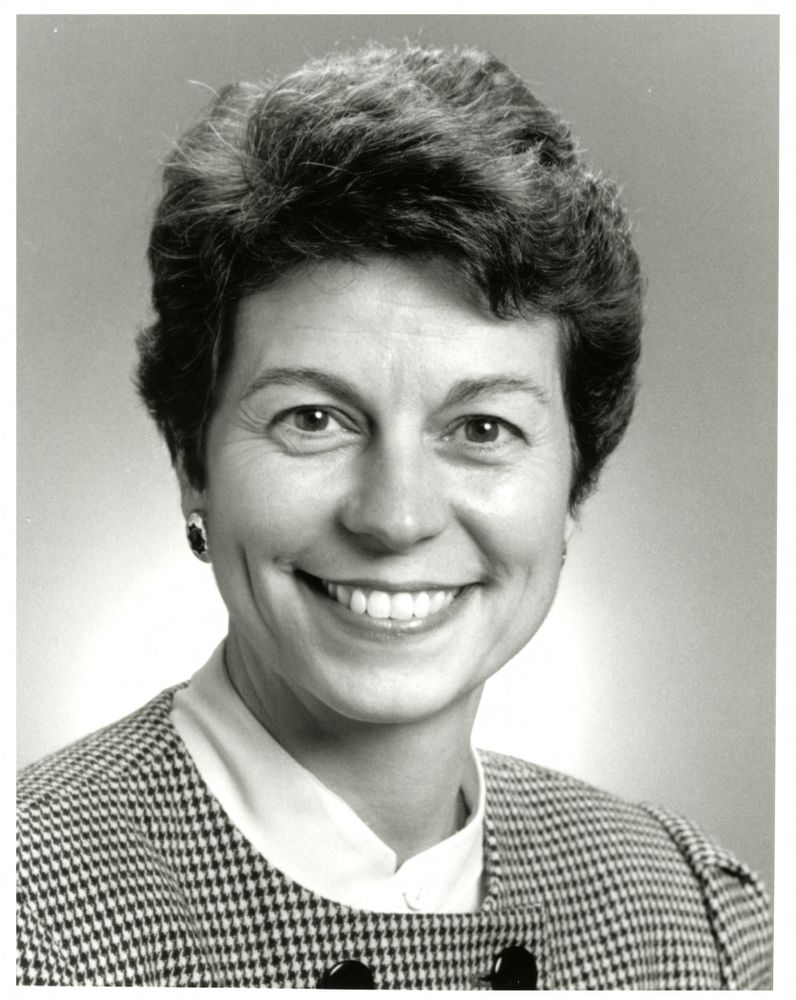
- Benson in 1991

44th Lieutenant Governor of Minnesota
- In office January 3, 1995 – January 4, 1999
- Governor: Arne Carlson
- Preceded by: Joanell Dyrstad
- Succeeded by: Mae Schunk

Member of the Minnesota Senate
- In office January 8, 1991 – January 2, 1995
- Preceded by: Jim Pehler
- Succeeded by: Dave Kleis
- Constituency: 16th district (1993–1995); 17th district (1991–1993)

Personal details
- Born: January 4, 1943 (age 83) Le Sueur, Minnesota, U.S.
- Party: Republican
- Spouse: Robert R. Benson
- Children: 2
- Education: St. Cloud State University (BS)

Joanne E. Benson (born January 4, 1943) is an American politician and educator who served as the 44th lieutenant governor of Minnesota from January 3, 1995, to January 4, 1999. A Republican, she was elected as Arne Carlson's running mate. From 1991 to 1995, Benson served as a member of the Minnesota Senate.

== Early life and education ==
Benson was born in Le Sueur, Minnesota. She earned a Bachelor of Science degree in elementary education from St. Cloud State University.

== Career ==
Benson was a member of the Minnesota Senate from 1991 to 1995. She became lieutenant governor when she and Arne Carlson won the 1994 Minnesota gubernatorial election in a landslide.

Benson later ran in the 1998 Minnesota gubernatorial election in the Republican primary for governor, starting off as the front-runner. Despite her attempt to amass enough support within the GOP establishment to ward off any primary challengers, a late entrant to the race, St. Paul Mayor Norm Coleman, garnered enough delegates to win the Republican endorsement at the state convention. Placing third in the race for delegates behind Coleman and Allen Quist, Benson agreed not to challenge Coleman in the primary. He won the nomination but lost the general election to the Reform Party nominee, Jesse Ventura.

Upon leaving office in 1999, Benson became the first chief education officer of the Minnesota Business Academy. In that capacity, she worked with civic and state leaders to raise money for the school. Benson was a member of the Governor’s State Capitol 2005 Commission, a group of prominent Minnesota citizens who were tasked with advising then-Governor Tim Pawlenty on the 2005 centennial celebration of the Minnesota State Capitol.

== Personal life ==
Benson is married to Robert R. Benson. She has two children, six grandchildren, and five great grandchildren.

== See also ==
- List of female lieutenant governors in the United States

Party political offices
Preceded by Joanell Dyrstad	Republican nominee for Lieutenant Governor of Minnesota; 1994	Succeeded by Gen Olson
