= Joanell Dyrstad =

American politician (born 1942)

43rd Lieutenant Governor of Minnesota
- In office January 7, 1991 – January 3, 1995
- Governor: Arne Carlson
- Preceded by: Marlene Johnson
- Succeeded by: Joanne Benson

4th Chair of the National Lieutenant Governors Association
- In office 1993–1994
- Preceded by: Frank O'Bannon
- Succeeded by: Melinda Schwegmann

Mayor of Red Wing, Minnesota
- In office 1985–1991

Personal details
- Born: October 15, 1942 (age 83) St. James, Minnesota, U.S.
- Party: Republican
- Spouse: Marvin Dyrstad
- Profession: businessperson, politician

Joanell M. Dyrstad (born October 15, 1942) is an American politician from Minnesota was the 43rd lieutenant governor of Minnesota, serving from January 7, 1991, to January 3, 1995. She was elected with Governor Arne Carlson. In 1994, Dyrstad ran for the U.S. Senate but lost the Independent Republican primary to Rod Grams.

== Biography ==
Born and raised in St. James, Minnesota, Dyrstad (née Sletta) spent most of her adult life in Red Wing, where she served as mayor from 1985 to 1991. While mayor, Dyrstad served on the local United Way chapter's board and was a member of the Minnesota League of Cities board. She also operated a local drugstore with her husband, Marvin. She is often credited with leading efforts to revitalize the historic riverfront of downtown Red Wing.

Though not Minnesota's first female lieutenant governor, Dyrstad was the first lieutenant governor in the state, and perhaps the nation, to deliver part of a State of the State address when she spoke for Governor Carlson in 1991.

In 1994, Dyrstad ran an aggressive campaign in the Independent Republican primary for U.S. Senate against Congressman Rod Grams. She compared Grams, a former news reporter, to bumbling fictional TV anchor Ted Baxter from the Minnesota-based TV program The Mary Tyler Moore Show.

In the 2006 gubernatorial election, Dyrstad endorsed Independence Party nominee Peter Hutchinson over the more conservative Republican incumbent, Tim Pawlenty.

Joanell and Marvin Dyrstad have two children and four grandchildren.

== Electoral history ==
- 1994 Race for U.S. Senate (Republican Primary)
  - Rod Grams (R), 58%
  - Joanell Dyrstad (R), 35%
  - Harold Stassen (R), 5%
- 1990 Race for Governor/Lieutenant Governor
  - Carlson/Dyrstad (R), 50%
  - Perpich/Johnson (D), 47%

== See also ==
- List of female lieutenant governors in the United States

Party political offices
Preceded by Dennis W. Schulstad	Republican nominee for Lieutenant Governor of Minnesota; 1990	Succeeded by Joanne Benson
Political offices
Preceded by Marlene Johnson	Lieutenant Governor of Minnesota; 1991–1995	Succeeded by Joanne Benson
