= Mark Dayton =

American politician (born 1947)

- Dayton in 2026

40th Governor of Minnesota
- In office January 3, 2011 – January 7, 2019
- Lieutenant: Yvonne Prettner Solon; Tina Smith; Michelle Fischbach
- Preceded by: Tim Pawlenty
- Succeeded by: Tim Walz

United States Senator from Minnesota
- In office January 3, 2001 – January 3, 2007
- Preceded by: Rod Grams
- Succeeded by: Amy Klobuchar

15th Auditor of Minnesota
- In office January 7, 1991 – January 3, 1995
- Governor: Arne Carlson
- Preceded by: Arne Carlson
- Succeeded by: Judi Dutcher

Personal details
- Born: Mark Brandt Dayton; January 26, 1947 (age 79) Minneapolis, Minnesota, U.S.
- Party: Democratic (DFL)
- Spouses: Alida Rockefeller (m. 1978; div. 1986); Janice Haarstick (m. 1996; div. 1999); Ana Orke (m. 2020)
- Children: 2
- Relatives: Bruce Dayton (father); Douglas Dayton (uncle); George Dayton (great-grandfather)
- Education: Yale University (BA)
- Dayton's voice Dayton criticizing the alleged urgency of a 2002 AUMF Against Iraq. Recorded October 20, 2002

Mark Brandt Dayton (born January 26, 1947) is an American politician who served as the 40th governor of Minnesota from 2011 to 2019. He served as a United States Senator representing Minnesota from 2001 to 2007 and as Minnesota State Auditor from 1991 to 1995. He is a member of the Minnesota Democratic–Farmer–Labor Party (DFL), which affiliates with the national Democratic Party.

Dayton is the great-grandson of businessman George Dayton, the founder of Dayton's, a department store that later became the Target Corporation. Born and raised in Minnesota, he embarked on a career in teaching and social work in New York City and Boston after graduating from Yale University in 1969. During the 1970s, Dayton served as a legislative aide to U.S. Senator Walter Mondale and Minnesota Governor Rudy Perpich. In 1978, Dayton was appointed the Minnesota Economic Development Commissioner and married Alida Rockefeller Messinger, a member of the Rockefeller family.

Dayton ran for the U.S. Senate in 1982 against Republican Party incumbent David Durenberger. He campaigned as a populist in opposition to Reaganomics and famously promised "to close tax loopholes for the rich and the corporations—and if you think that includes the Daytons, you're right." Durenberger won the election, and Dayton returned to the Perpich administration until his election as Minnesota State Auditor in 1990. In 1998, Dayton ran for governor, losing the Democratic nomination to Hubert Humphrey III. In 2000, he was elected to the U.S. Senate, defeating Republican incumbent Rod Grams.

As senator, Dayton voted against the authorization for the Iraq War and introduced legislation creating a cabinet-level United States Department of Peace. In 2006, he chose not to seek reelection, citing his disillusionment with Washington, D.C., and fundraising. In 2010, Dayton defeated Republican Tom Emmer to become governor of Minnesota despite national success for the Republican Party, including in the Minnesota legislature. He won a second term in 2014 over Republican opponent Jeff Johnson and opted not to run for a third term in 2018. His major legislative initiatives during his governorship include the legalization of same-sex marriage and the construction of U.S. Bank Stadium.

== Early life, education, and career ==
Dayton was born on January 26, 1947, in Minneapolis and is the eldest of Gwendolen May (Brandt) and Bruce Bliss Dayton's four children. He is a great-grandson of businessman George Dayton, the founder of the Dayton's department store chain. His father, Bruce Dayton, served as the chairman and CEO of Dayton Hudson Corporation, the company that later became the Target Corporation. Bruce Dayton also founded the B. Dalton bookstore chain in 1966.

Mark Dayton was raised in Long Lake, Minnesota, and graduated from the Blake School in Minneapolis, where he was an all-state ice-hockey goaltender as a senior.

Dayton attended Yale University, where he played varsity hockey until an accident on the ice. During his time at Yale, he joined the Delta Kappa Epsilon fraternity (alongside future President George W. Bush) and received his Bachelor of Arts in psychology in 1969. After college, Dayton worked as teacher on the Lower East Side of Manhattan in New York City from 1969 to 1971, and then as the chief financial officer of a social service agency in Boston from 1971 to 1975. He married his first wife, Alida Rockefeller, in 1978.

== Early political career and U.S. Senate ==
Dayton first became politically active in the 1960s. He protested the Vietnam War in April 1970 at one of Minnesota's major antiwar protests against Honeywell, where he was maced by police. Dayton's father served on the Honeywell board of directors and the two had a strained relationship after the incident.

From 1975 to 1976 he was a legislative aide to Senator Walter Mondale, until Mondale's election as Vice President of the United States. From 1977 to 1978, Dayton served as an aide to Minnesota Governor Rudy Perpich. In 1978, Perpich appointed Dayton to head the Department of Economic Development and then the Department of Energy and Economic Development.

Dayton first ran for the U.S. Senate in 1982, challenging Republican incumbent David Durenberger. After losing the election to Durenberger, Dayton returned to the Perpich administration until his election as Minnesota State Auditor in 1990; he served in that position until 1995.

In 1998, Dayton ran for governor, losing the DFL nomination to Hubert Humphrey III. He received 18% of the vote, finishing fourth in the DFL primary. Humphrey lost the general election to the Reform Party nominee, Jesse Ventura.

In 2000, Dayton was elected to the U.S. Senate, defeating Republican incumbent Rod Grams, 49% to 43%.

== U.S. Senate ==
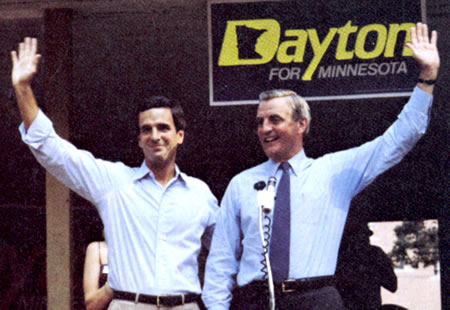
Dayton campaigning with former Vice President Walter Mondale during his first run for the Senate in 1982.

=== Elections ===
Dayton first ran for the U.S. Senate in 1982, challenging Republican incumbent David Durenberger and former U.S. senator Eugene McCarthy in the DFL primary. McCarthy's reputation was harmed by his endorsement of Republican Ronald Reagan in the 1980 presidential election; Dayton defeated him with over 69% of the vote. The general election was one of the most expensive in state history. Dayton campaigned as a populist in opposition to Reaganomics and famously promised "to close tax loopholes for the rich and the corporations—and if you think that includes the Daytons, you're right." Durenberger, who was considered a moderate but had supported Reagan's tax cuts, won the election, 52% to 46%.

Dayton ran for the Senate again in 2000. He won the DFL nomination with 41% of the vote in a six-candidate field and defeated Republican incumbent Rod Grams in the general election, 49% to 43%. Dayton self-financed his campaign with $12 million.

=== Tenure ===
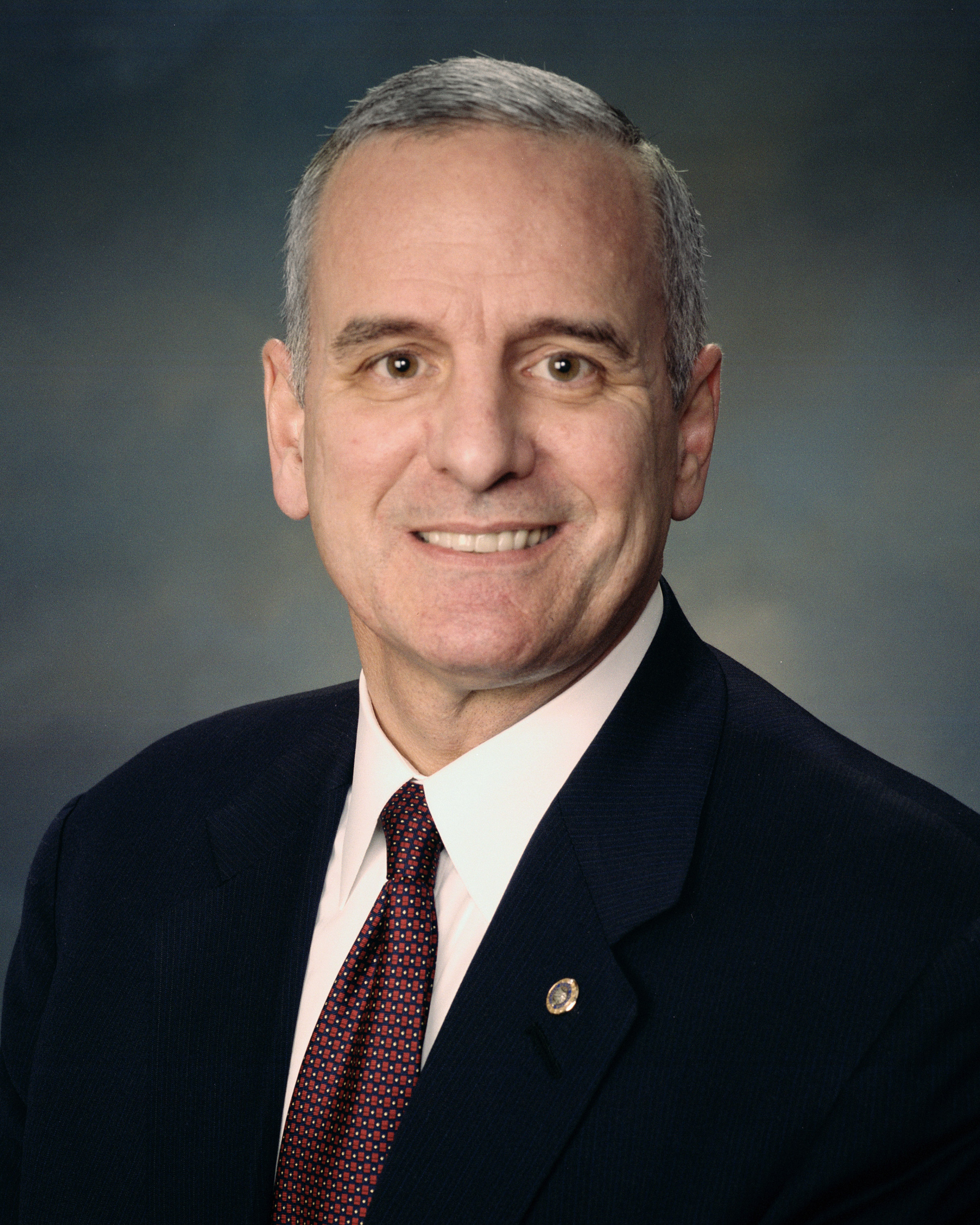
Official photo

As senator, Dayton voted against the authorization for Iraq War, and he was the first senator to introduce legislation creating a cabinet-level United States Department of Peace.

While in the Senate, Dayton donated his salary to fund bus trips for seniors to buy cheaper prescription drugs in Canada. He generally voted with his fellow Democrats.

On February 9, 2005, he announced that he would not run for reelection, saying, "Everything I've worked for, and everything I believe in, depends upon this Senate seat remaining in the Democratic caucus in 2007. I do not believe that I am the best candidate to lead the DFL Party to victory next year." He also cited his dislike of fundraising and political campaigns. Dayton was succeeded in the Senate by Amy Klobuchar, another DFL member.

On September 22, 2005, the 44th anniversary of the day President John F. Kennedy signed the Peace Corps into law, Dayton became the first U.S. senator to introduce legislation creating a cabinet-level Department of Peace. At the same time, Representative Dennis Kucinich introduced similar legislation in the House.

In April 2006, Time magazine rated Dayton one of America's "Five Worst Senators", calling him "The Blunderer" for such "erratic behavior" as his temporary closure of his office in 2004 because of an unspecified terrorist threat, his complaints about "limited power in a chamber where authority derives from seniority", and a February 2005 comment that the Mayo Clinic in Rochester, Minnesota, was "worth a hell of a lot more than the whole state of South Dakota", a remark he later apologized for. News reports of a Dayton question-and-answer session quoted him giving himself an F grade for his time in the Senate. Largely based on his Washington behavior, The New Republic dubbed Dayton's subsequent run for state-level elected office "Eeyore For Governor."

In September 2006, Dayton requested a review of the Rogers, Minnesota, tornado to determine whether the National Weather Service had acted properly and the victims' deaths were unavoidable.

=== Committee assignments ===
- Committee on Armed Services
  - Subcommittee on Airland
  - Subcommittee on Readiness and Management Support
  - Subcommittee on Strategic Forces
- Committee on Agriculture, Nutrition and Forestry
  - Subcommittee on Commodities, Markets, Trade and Risk Management
  - Subcommittee on Conservation, Forestry and Natural Resources
- Committee on Homeland Security and Governmental Affairs
  - Subcommittee on Federal Financial Management, Government Information and International Security
  - Subcommittee on Oversight of Government Management, the Federal Workforce and the District of Columbia
  - Permanent Subcommittee on Investigations
- Committee on Rules and Administration
- Joint Committee on Printing

=== Office of Senator Mark Dayton v. Brad Hanson ===
The 2003 lawsuit Office of Senator Mark Dayton v. Brad Hanson involved an accusation of wrongful termination by Brad Hanson, who worked as State Office Manager for Dayton, and who was fired shortly after taking medical leave for a heart problem. Hanson sued under the Congressional Accountability Act of 1995, claiming that Dayton had discriminated against him because of a perceived disability. Dayton argued that he was immunized from suit by the speech or debate clause of the United States Constitution. Dayton claimed that Hanson's duties were directly related to Dayton's legislative functions and that the decision to fire him could not be challenged. The District Court denied the motion, and the case went all the way to the Supreme Court of the United States, where oral arguments were heard on April 24, 2007. The Supreme Court ruled 8–0 that it lacked jurisdiction to hear the appeal and dismissed the case, declining to grant certiorari. Dayton reached a settlement with Hanson in 2009, shortly after Dayton became a candidate for governor.

== Governor of Minnesota ==
=== Elections ===
On January 16, 2009, Dayton announced his candidacy for Governor of Minnesota. In a crowded Democratic field of challengers, Dayton chose to bypass the state caucuses and convention in favor of the primary election. He stated he made that decision because the primary election is a more democratic method of choosing a candidate. He relied on personal funds for his campaign. On May 24, 2010, he announced State Senator Yvonne Prettner Solon of Duluth as his running mate for lieutenant governor. On August 10, 2010, Dayton defeated the DFL-endorsed Margaret Anderson Kelliher in the primary election by 1,500 votes, 41.33% to 39.75%, in what was called a "remarkable political comeback". He was later endorsed by the Minnesota DFL to earn his party's nomination for governor.

At the close of balloting in the general election on November 2, 2010, Dayton led his Republican opponent, Tom Emmer, by just under 9,000 votes. The margin of victory was small enough to trigger an automatic recount under state law. Analysts generally thought it unlikely that Dayton's lead would be overturned. During the hand recount of ballots, Emmer failed to find enough questionable ballots to overturn Dayton's lead. Emmer conceded the election on December 8, 2010. Minnesota Independence Party candidate Tom Horner received 11.9% of the vote, and it has been suggested that Horner cost Emmer the election by splitting the vote.

Ahead of the 2014 gubernatorial election, Lieutenant Governor Prettner Solon chose to retire. Dayton replaced her with longtime political staffer Tina Smith, who had been Dayton's chief of staff. Dayton defeated Republican nominee Jeff Johnson, 50.1% to 44.5%, the first time since 1994 that the winning Minnesota gubernatorial candidate received a majority of the vote.

=== Tenure ===
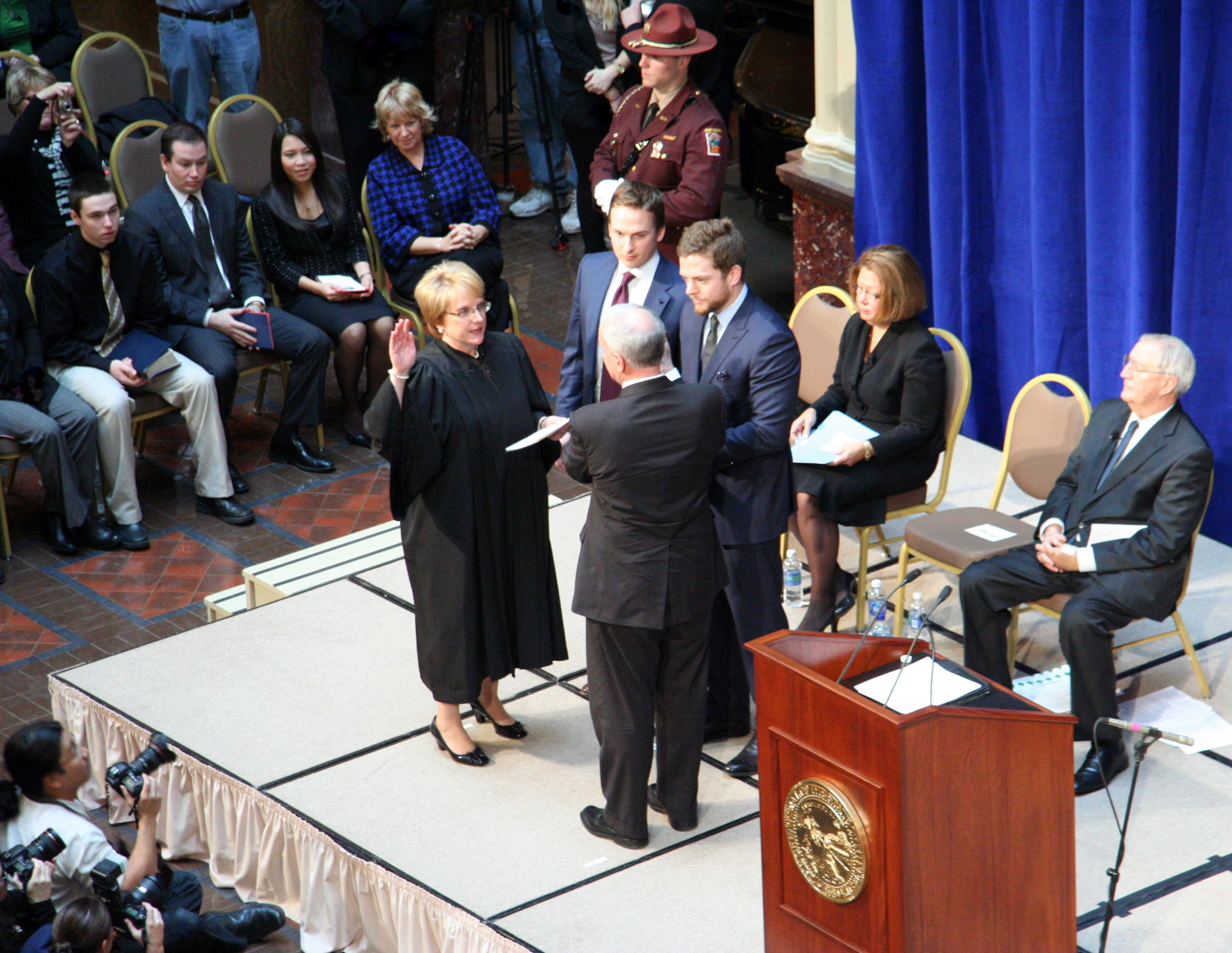
Dayton being sworn in as Governor

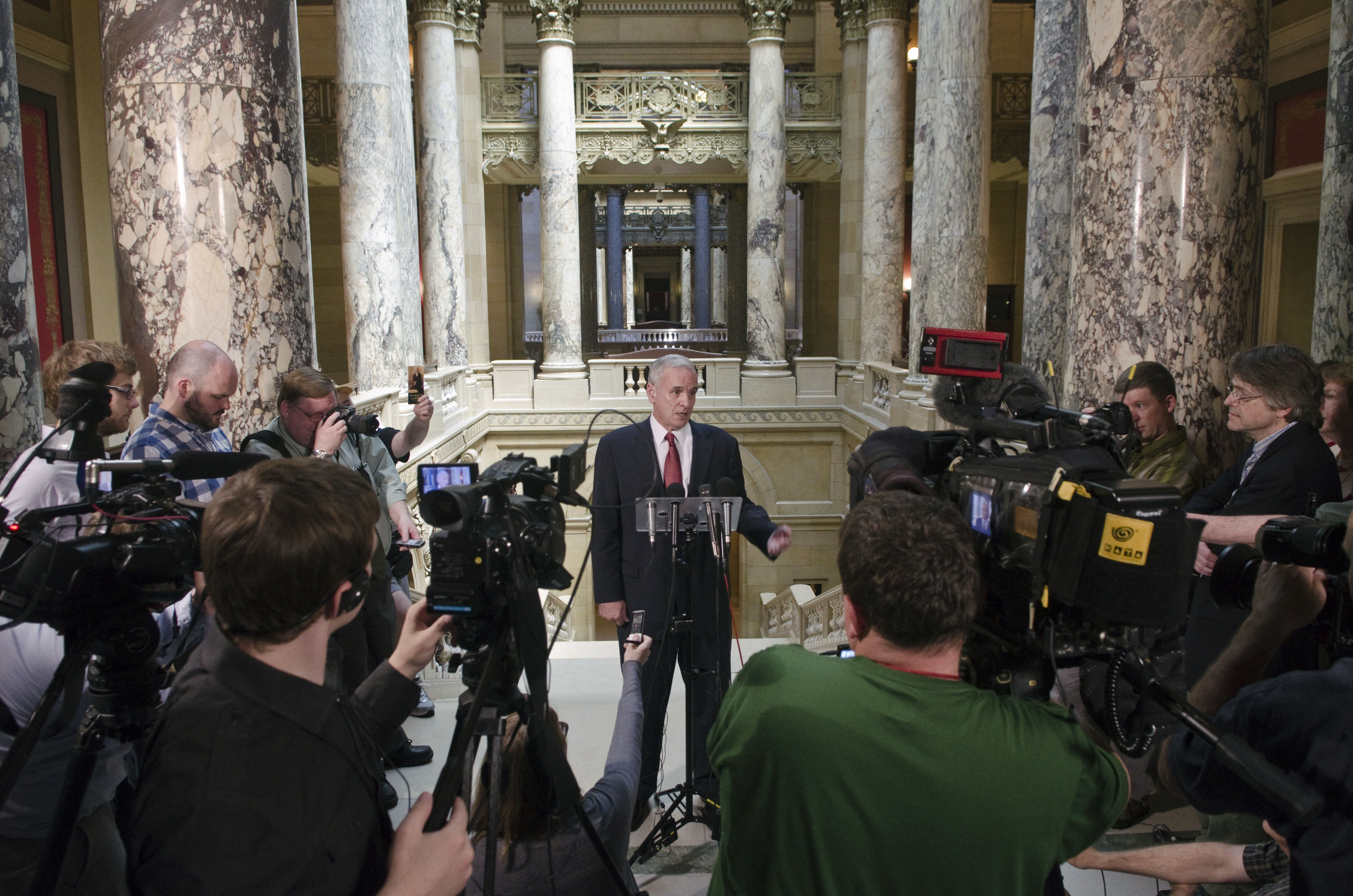
Dayton speaking to the press in the State Capitol on budget negotiations days before the government shutdown

Dayton took the oath of office to become governor on January 3, 2011. Taking office a few weeks before his 64th birthday, he was the oldest person ever inaugurated as governor in Minnesota history. Former Vice President and Senator Walter Mondale served as Master of Ceremonies at the inauguration. The first DFLer to serve as governor in 20 years, Dayton succeeded Republican Governor Tim Pawlenty. On January 5, Dayton signed two executive orders allowing the Minnesota Departments of Commerce and Health to apply for federal health-care grants and providing $1.2 billion in federal funds for an Early Option in a statewide Medicaid Opt-In program. These executive orders reversed the previous administration's ban on federal funding for the state health-care system. In March 2011, Dayton signed a law increasing penalties on those who injure or kill police dogs.

On July 1, 2011, the Minnesota government went into a shutdown as a result of an impasse during budget negotiations between Dayton and the Republican-led legislature. On July 20, Dayton and the legislature reached an agreement, ending the shutdown.

Dayton led an effort to have a new stadium constructed for the Minnesota Vikings. In May 2011, after efforts to have the stadium financed by Hennepin County failed, Ramsey County officials announced they had reached an agreement with the Vikings to be the team's local partner for a new stadium, subject to approval by the Minnesota Legislature and to approval of a sales tax by the Ramsey County Board. Dayton was reluctant to go along with the team's Arden Hills proposal because it would cost $1.1 billion, including an additional $131 million for road improvements, and later tried to have the stadium built on the site of the farmers' market near Linden Avenue in downtown Minneapolis. On March 1, 2012, plans to build the stadium in either Arden Hills or at the Linden Avenue site were abandoned after Dayton announced an agreement for a new stadium to be built on the site of the Metrodome, pending approval by the state legislature and the Minneapolis City Council. In May 2012, the proposal to build the stadium on the Metrodome site was passed by the Minnesota Legislature and was signed into law by Dayton. On May 25, the proposal was officially finalized after receiving the Minneapolis City Council's approval.

In 2012, Dayton commemorated the 150th anniversary of the Dakota War of 1862 with a call for reconciliation and repudiation of former governor Alexander Ramsey's position. Flags were flown at half mast for a "Day of Remembrance and Reconciliation in Minnesota".

In the legislative session that ended in May 2013, Dayton pushed for and won a $2.1 billion tax increase, mostly on the wealthy and cigarettes. He also signed a bill legalizing gay marriage in Minnesota, created free, statewide, all-day kindergarten, and financed expansions of the Mayo Clinic, 3M, and the Mall of America. In the spring 2014 session, Dayton came under fire from supporters and foes alike for opposing the legalization of medical marijuana, which polls showed 65% of Minnesotans supported. One supporter, the mother of a child with severe epilepsy, alleged Dayton told her in a meeting that he would not legalize the drug but she could buy it illegally instead. Dayton denied saying that. On April 2, Marijuana Policy Project began airing an ad across the state attacking Dayton's opposition to medical marijuana legalization, featuring a St. Paul mother and her child whose severe seizures could be cured by medical marijuana.

In May 2017, Dayton signed an executive order requiring firms that have state contracts not to boycott Israel.

On December 6, 2017, Politico reported that Dayton was expected to appoint Lieutenant Governor Tina Smith to Al Franken's Senate seat if Franken resigned amid multiple sexual misconduct allegations against him. Franken resigned on January 2, 2018, and Dayton then appointed Smith to the seat.

== Political positions ==
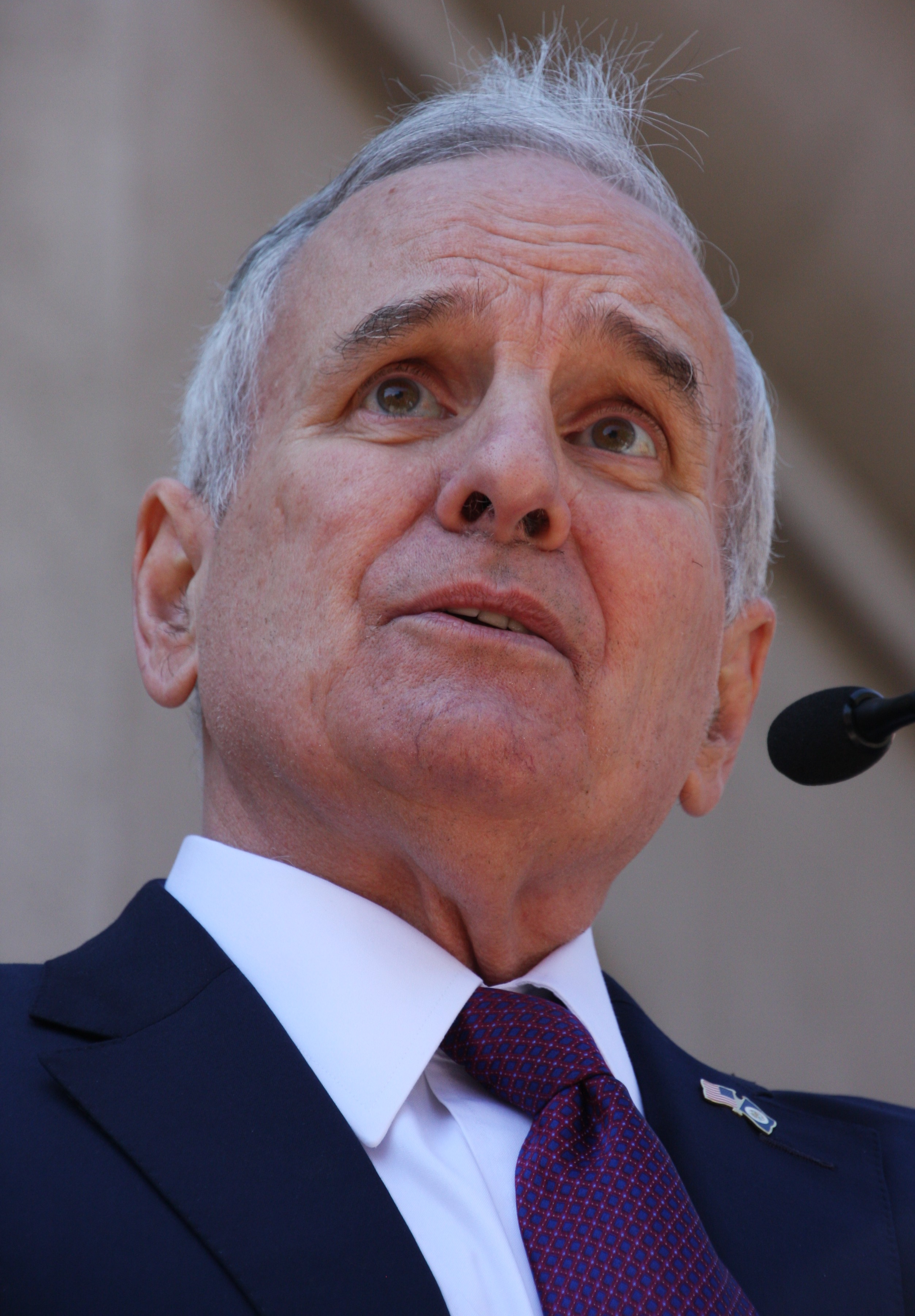
Dayton speaking in 2017

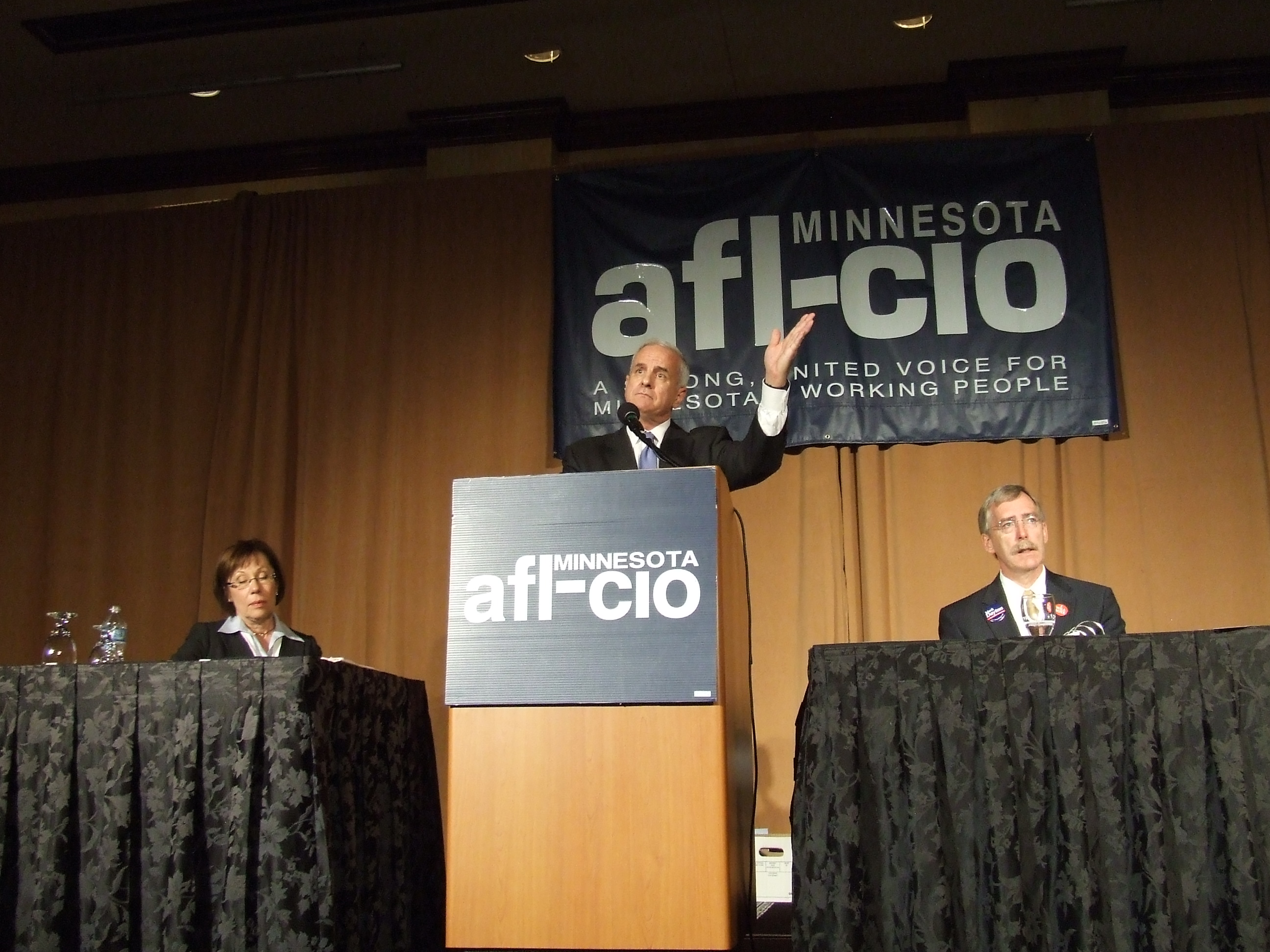
Dayton speaking in 2010

As of 2010, Dayton received 100% ratings from the AFL–CIO, the National Association for the Advancement of Colored People, the National Abortion and Reproductive Rights Action League, and Americans for Democratic Action. He received a 79% rating from the League of Conservation Voters for his support of green energy as of 2010. In 2005, Dayton scored a 9% rating from the Small Business & Entrepreneurship Council.

=== Healthcare ===
Dayton supports health-care coverage for all Americans, with increased state and federal spending on health care. He supports a progressive tax to decrease state and federal deficits. To create jobs, he proposed a state stimulus package as part of his gubernatorial platform. Dayton supports increased funding for K–12 schools, with increased teachers' salaries and decreased class size.

In July 2000, Dayton answered an election questionnaire saying he would expand Medicare prescription-drug coverage. He favors keeping Social Security intact, opposing its privatization. He received a 90% rating from the Alliance for Retired Americans.

=== Medical marijuana ===
Until 2013, Dayton opposed the legalization of medical cannabis and drug policy reform, adopting the same position as his Republican predecessor Tim Pawlenty. The Marijuana Policy Project called Dayton "no more favorable" to drug policy reform than the last Republican governor. When Dayton posed a $2 million study on medical marijuana with the Mayo Clinic instead of signing a bill to legalize medical marijuana, advocates "bashed" Dayton for not allowing suffering patients to have access to the drug. City Pages reported that the Governor could lose the vote of the many supporters of medical marijuana, 65% of Minnesotans, to the 3/5 of Republican candidates for governor in 2014 who "strike a more liberal tone on marijuana reform" than the Democratic incumbent.

=== Same-sex marriage ===
With Senator Joe Lieberman and Representative Barney Frank, Dayton introduced legislation to the Governmental Affairs Committee to extend domestic partners of federal employees all benefits available and obligations imposed upon a spouse of an employee. Dayton voted against a constitutional ban of same-sex marriage in June 2006, and he supported civil marriage equality in his gubernatorial platform. On May 14, 2013, Governor Dayton signed into law a bill passed by the Minnesota House and Senate to legalize same-sex marriage in the state.

=== Iraq War ===
In October 2002, Dayton voted against the Authorization for Use of Military Force Against Iraq. He followed up three years later by introducing Senate Bill 1756 to create a cabinet-level Department of Peace a week after Dennis Kucinich introduced a similar bill in the House. The bill never emerged from the Committee on Homeland Security and Governmental Affairs.

== Personal life ==
Dayton was born into one of Minnesota's most famous families. His father built the family business into a retail empire.

Dayton found his political calling while studying pre-med at Yale University, after his political hero, Robert F. Kennedy, was assassinated. Dayton soon began his career in public service. In the 1970s, his political activism earned him a spot as the only Minnesotan on Richard Nixon's "enemies list", a fact he cited in future campaign speeches. In a 1982 race, Dayton called his wealth his "original sin" and promised to close tax loopholes for corporations and the rich.

Dayton has been married three times. In 1978, he married Alida Ferry Rockefeller, at the Rockefeller home in Tarrytown, New York. Alida is the youngest sister of former U.S. Senator Jay Rockefeller. Together they had two sons, Eric and Andrew. They divorced in 1986.

Despite his wealth, Dayton lives modestly. He is a recovering alcoholic and has been treated for mild depression. He revealed this information on his own initiative, saying he felt "people have the right to know."

In December 2012, Dayton underwent vertebral fusion surgery at the Mayo Clinic to treat his spinal stenosis. On June 25, 2013, he had to cancel an appearance due to a muscle tear. In January 2016, Dayton fainted while speaking at a campaign event in Woodbury, Minnesota. He was hospitalized overnight. A year later, he collapsed while giving the State of the State address to the Minnesota legislature. After a check by emergency medical services, he was reported to be in fine condition and was sent home that evening. The next day he announced that he had been diagnosed with prostate cancer a week earlier.

On October 8, 2019, the University of Minnesota's Center for Integrative Leadership announced that Dayton had joined the center as an Executive Leadership Fellow for the 2019–2020 academic year.

In December 2020, Dayton married former congressional intern and campaign staffer Ana Orke. He first met her at a 2005 political fundraiser when he was in the U.S. Senate.

In 2026, the Minnesota Historical Society published Dayton's Perseverance: a Memoir, with a foreword by Hillary Clinton.

== Electoral history ==
=== 1982: U.S. Senator ===
1982 United States Senate election in Minnesota (General election)
Party	Candidate	Votes	%
Republican	David Durenberger (Incumbent)	949,207	52.60
Democratic (DFL)	Mark Dayton	840,401	46.57

=== 1998: Governor of Minnesota ===
1998 Minnesota gubernatorial election (Democratic primary)
Party	Candidate	Votes	%
Democratic (DFL)	Skip Humphrey	154,037	37
Democratic (DFL)	Mike Freeman	78,895	19
Democratic (DFL)	Doug Johnson	78,041	19
Democratic (DFL)	Mark Dayton	74,706	18
Democratic (DFL)	Ted Mondale	29,749	7

=== 2000: U.S. Senator ===
2000 United States Senate Democratic primary election in Minnesota (Primary election)
Party	Candidate	Votes	%
DFL	Mark Dayton	178,972	41.29
DFL	Mike Ciresi	96,874	22.35
DFL	Jerry Janezich	90,074	20.78
DFL	Rebecca Yanisch	63,289	14.60
DFL	"Dick" Franson	1,336	0.31
DFL	Ole Savior	1,206	0.28
DFL	Gregg Iverson	1,038	0.24
DFL	Hal Dorland	610	0.14

2000 United States Senate election in Minnesota (General election)
Party	Candidate	Votes	%
Democratic (DFL)	Mark Dayton	1,181,533	48.83
Republican	Rod Grams (incumbent)	1,047,474	43.29
Independence	James Gibson	140,583	5.81

=== 2010: Governor of Minnesota ===
2010 Minnesota gubernatorial election (Democratic primary)
Party	Candidate	Votes	%
Democratic (DFL)	Mark Dayton	182,738	41.3
Democratic (DFL)	Margaret Anderson Kelliher	175,767	39.8
Democratic (DFL)	Matt Entenza	80,509	18.2
Democratic (DFL)	Peter Idusogie	3,123	0.7

2010 Minnesota gubernatorial election (General election)
Party	Candidate	Votes	%
Democratic (DFL)	Mark Dayton	919,232	43.63
Republican	Tom Emmer	910,462	43.21
Independence	Tom Horner	251,487	11.94

=== 2014: Governor of Minnesota ===
2014 Minnesota gubernatorial Democratic primary election
Democratic (DFL)	Mark Dayton/Tina Smith (Incumbent)	177,849	92.99
Democratic (DFL)	Leslie Davis/Gregory Soderberg	8,530	4.46
Democratic (DFL)	Bill Davis/James Vigliotti	4,880	2.55
Party	Candidate	Votes	%

2014 Minnesota gubernatorial election
Party	Candidate	Votes	%
Democratic (DFL)	Mark Dayton/Tina Smith (Incumbent)	989,113	50.07
Republican	Jeff Johnson/Bill Kuisle	879,257	44.51
Independence	Hannah Nicollet/Tim Gieseke	56,900	2.88

Party political offices
Preceded by Bob Short	Democratic nominee for U.S. Senator from Minnesota (Class 1); 1982	Succeeded by Skip Humphrey
Preceded by John Dooley	Democratic nominee for Auditor of Minnesota; 1990	Succeeded by Donald Moe
Preceded by Ann Wynia	Democratic nominee for U.S. Senator from Minnesota (Class 1); 2000	Succeeded by Amy Klobuchar
Preceded by Mike Hatch	Democratic nominee for Governor of Minnesota; 2010, 2014	Succeeded by Tim Walz
Political offices
Preceded by Arne Carlson	Auditor of Minnesota; 1991–1995	Succeeded by Judi Dutcher
Preceded by Tim Pawlenty	Governor of Minnesota; 2011–2019	Succeeded by Tim Walz
U.S. Senate
Preceded by Rod Grams	U.S. Senator (Class 3) from Minnesota; 2001–2007; Served alongside: Paul Wellstone, Dean Barkley, Norm Coleman	Succeeded by Amy Klobuchar
U.S. order of precedence (ceremonial)
Preceded by Tim Hutchinson as Former U.S. Senator	Order of precedence of the United States	Succeeded by Norm Coleman as Former U.S. Senator
