= David Durenberger =

American politician (1934–2023)

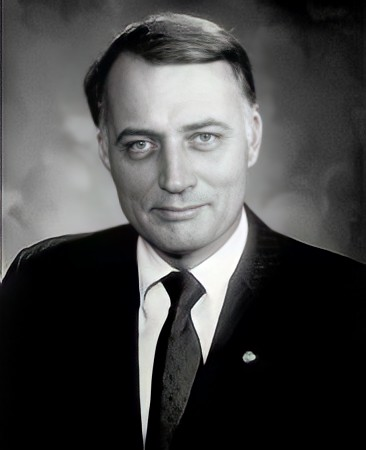

United States Senator from Minnesota
- In office November 8, 1978 – January 3, 1995
- Preceded by: Muriel Humphrey
- Succeeded by: Rod Grams

Personal details
- Born: David Ferdinand Durenberger; August 19, 1934 St. Cloud, Minnesota, U.S.
- Died: January 31, 2023 (aged 88) Saint Paul, Minnesota, U.S.
- Party: Republican (before 1975, 1995–2005); Independent-Republicans of Minnesota (1975–1995); Independent (2005–2023)
- Spouse(s): Judith McGlumphy (m. 1962; died 1970) Penny Baran Tuohy (m. 1971; div. 1993) Susan Bartlett Foote (m. 1995)
- Children: 4
- Education: Saint John's University, Minnesota (BA); University of Minnesota (JD)

Military service
- Branch/service: United States Army
- Years of service: 1956–1963
- David Durenberger's voice Durenberger on former Senator Lowell Weicker and the Senate's work on the Americans with Disabilities Act; Recorded July 11, 1990

David Ferdinand Durenberger (August 19, 1934 – January 31, 2023) was an American politician and attorney from Minnesota who served as a Republican member of the United States Senate from 1978 to 1995. He left the Republican Party in 2005 and became a critic of it, endorsing Democratic presidential nominees Hillary Clinton and Joe Biden in 2016 and 2020, respectively.

== Early life ==
Durenberger was born in St. Cloud, Minnesota, the son of Isabelle Marie (née Cebulla) and George Gephard Durenberger. He was a Roman Catholic of German and Polish descent. His father was the athletic director and a coach at College of Saint Benedict and Saint John's University in Collegeville, Minnesota, and the family lived on campus.

Durenberger graduated from St. John's Preparatory School there in 1951, and from the university in 1955. He attended the University of Minnesota Law School and earned his Juris Doctor in 1959. At St. John's he was the top-rated cadet in his Reserve Officers' Training Corps class, and after college was a lieutenant in the U.S. Army Counter-Intelligence Corps in 1956 and a captain in the United States Army Reserve from 1957 to 1963.

== Professional career ==
After law school, Durenberger was employed by a South St. Paul, Minnesota law firm with strong political connections. It had been founded in 1929 by Republican Harold Stassen, later the Governor of Minnesota from 1939 to 1943, and Elmer Ryan, a Democrat who was member of the United States House of Representatives from 1935 to 1941. When Durenberger joined it was headed by Harold LeVander. The firm took the name LeVander, Gillen, Miller and Durenberger.

LeVander, a Republican, was elected governor of Minnesota in 1966 and took office in January 1967, and Durenberger became his executive secretary from then until the end of LeVander's term in 1971. He then joined the H.B. Fuller as in-house counsel, corporate secretary, and manager of international licensing until 1978. He also served as chair of the Metropolitan Open Space Advisory Board from 1972 to 1974 and was on the Minnesota State Ethical Practices Board from 1974 to 1978.

== United States Senate ==
On November 7, 1978, Durenberger was elected to the United States Senate in a special election to complete the unexpired term of Senator Hubert Humphrey, who died earlier in the year; Humphrey's wife Muriel Humphrey held the seat until Durenberger's election. Durenberger was reelected in 1982 and again in 1988, defeating Mark Dayton and Minnesota Attorney General Skip Humphrey, respectively.

In the 99th Congress, Durenberger chaired the United States Senate Select Committee on Intelligence and the Health Subcommittee of the United States Senate Committee on Finance, giving him a leadership role in national health reform. He also chaired the Intergovernmental Relations Subcommittee, led President Ronald Reagan's New Federalism effort in 1982, and was a 14-year member of the Advisory Committee on Intergovernmental Relations. He was a member of the Senate Environment Committee, the Government Affairs Committee, and the committee now known as the United States Senate Committee on Health, Education, Labor and Pensions, and served as vice chair of the Pepper Commission in 1989–90.

Durenberger was Senate sponsor of the Medicare Catastrophic act, the AHCPR (now AHRQ) on voting rights for the disabled, the Americans with Disabilities Act of 1990, President George H. W. Bush's Thousand points of light, President Bill Clinton's National and Community Service Act, National Service Learning, the Consumer Choice Education Act, the Safe Drinking Water Act, the Direct Lending Act, and the Women's Economic Equity Act. Durenberger voted for the bill establishing Martin Luther King Jr. Day as a federal holiday and the Civil Rights Restoration Act of 1987 (as well as to override Ronald Reagan's veto). He voted to confirm Robert Bork and Clarence Thomas to the Supreme Court of the United States.

=== Misuse of public funds ===
In 1990, the senate voted 96–0 to censure Durenberger for ethics violations related to evading limits on $100,000 in speaking fees and using his condominium in Minneapolis to collect $40,000 in travel reimbursements. The Minnesota Supreme Court indefinitely suspended Durenberger's Minnesota law license on January 11, 1991, pursuant to a stipulation. It reinstated his license on March 22, 2000.

Durenberger did not run for reelection in 1994 and was succeeded by Rod Grams. In 1995, he pleaded guilty to charges of misuse of public funds while in office and was sentenced to one year of probation.

== Post-Senate life ==
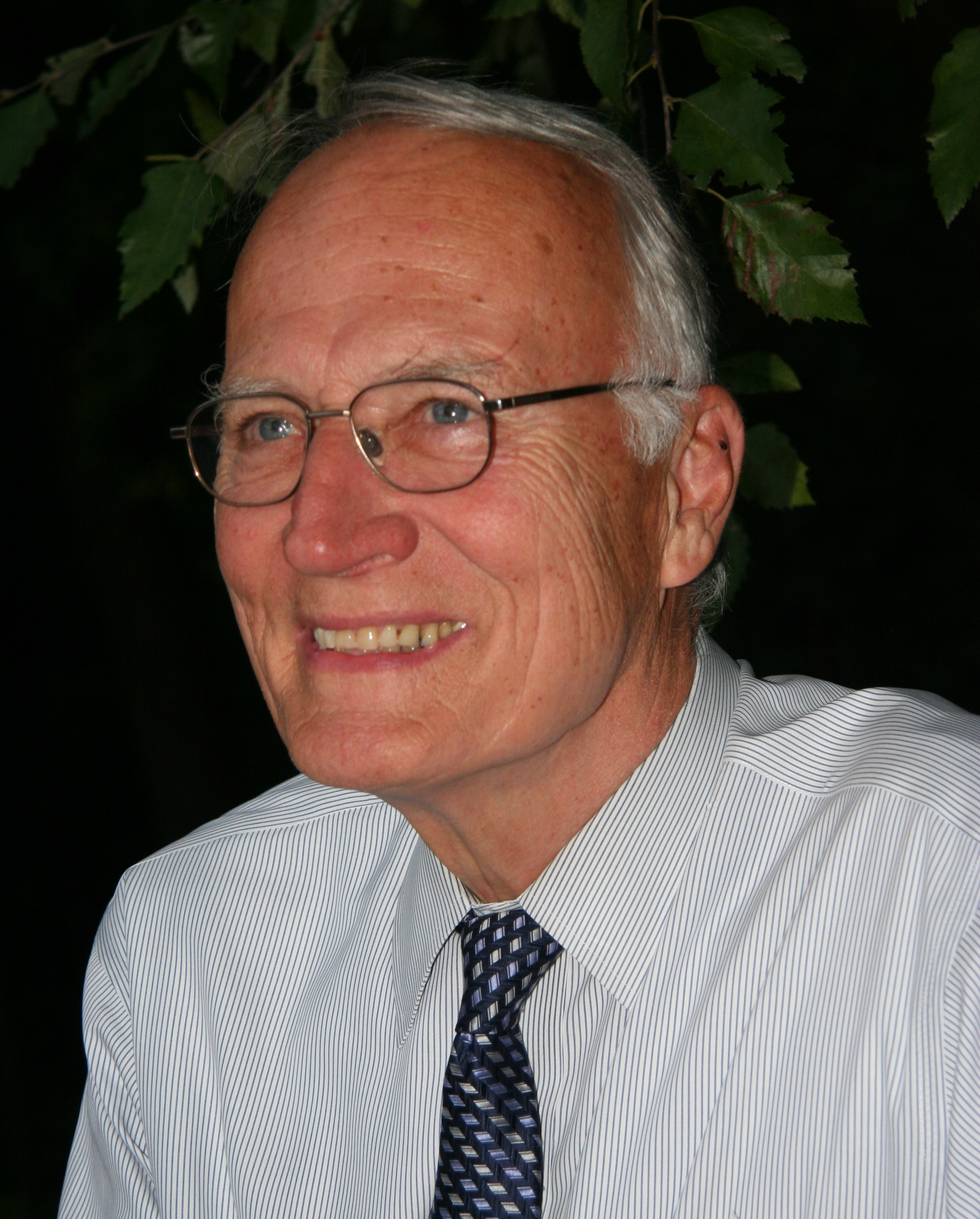
Durenberger in 2010

In a 2005 interview, Durenberger said he no longer supported the Republican Party but did not support the Democratic Party either. He also said that Democrats are better equipped to handle health care and that President George W. Bush was wrong about the Iraq War. In 2010, Durenberger endorsed his former chief of staff, Independence-Alliance Party member Tom Horner, for governor.

Durenberger chaired the National Institute of Health Policy (NIHP) and was a Senior Health Policy Fellow at the University of St. Thomas in Saint Paul, Minnesota. He served on the board of National Coalition on HealthCare. He has also served on national health commissions and boards, including the Medicare Payment Advisory Commission and Board of the National Commission on Quality Assurance (NCQA), and the Kaiser Commission on Medicaid and the Uninsured.

Durenberger endorsed former Secretary of State Hillary Clinton for president in 2016 and endorsed former Vice President Joe Biden for president in 2020. He was a member of the ReFormers Caucus of Issue One.

== Personal life ==
Durenberger's first wife, Judith, whom he married in 1962, died of cancer in 1970. He married his second wife, Penny, in 1971; they separated in 1985 and divorced in 1993. Durenberger married his third wife, Susan, in 1995. He had four sons and two stepchildren.

Durenberger died of heart failure at home in St. Paul on January 31, 2023, at age 88.

== Writings ==
A collection of Durenberger's senatorial files is held by the Minnesota Historical Society. It documents his three terms in the United States Senate and is strongest in its documentation of the third (1989–95). The papers are perhaps most significant for the information they contain about his interest in, and legislative activities regarding, health policy and health care reform issues.

Durenberger's books include When Republicans were Progressive, which traces the history of Minnesota's Republican party from the era of Stassen, a moderate Republican governor who took office in 1939, to the ascent of a more conservative strain within the party in the late 1980s (Durenberger lamented the polarization of more recent politics); Neither Madmen nor Messiahs: A Policy of National Security for America (1984), on defense policy; and Prescription for Change (1986), on health care reform.

== See also ==
- List of American federal politicians convicted of crimes
- List of federal political scandals in the United States
- List of United States senators expelled or censured

Party political offices
Preceded by Gerald Brekke	Republican nominee for U.S. Senator from Minnesota (Class 1); 1978, 1982, 1988	Succeeded by Rod Grams
U.S. Senate
Preceded by Muriel Humphrey	United States Senator (Class 1) from Minnesota; 1978–1995; Served alongside: Wendell R. Anderson, Rudy Boschwitz, Paul Wellstone	Succeeded by Rod Grams
Preceded by Barry Goldwater	Chair of the Senate Intelligence Committee; 1985–1987	Succeeded by David Boren
