= Bert McKasy =

American lawyer and politician (1942–2019)

Member of the Minnesota House of Representatives from the 39A district
- In office January 4, 1983 – January 2, 1989

Personal details
- Born: January 10, 1942
- Died: February 8, 2019 (aged 77)
- Party: Republican Party of Minnesota
- Spouse: Carolyn Dieveney
- Children: Kristi, Mark, Liz, and Shannon
- Education: University of St. Thomas

Bert J. McKasy (January 10, 1942 – February 8, 2019) was an American lawyer and politician.

== Background ==
McKasy was born in Saint Paul, Minnesota. He graduated from Saint Thomas Academy in Mendota Heights, Minnesota. He received his bachelor's and law degrees from University of St. Thomas and University of Minnesota Law School. McKasy practiced law in Mendota Heights, Minnesota. McKasy served in the Minnesota House of Representatives from 1983 until 1988 and was a Republican. He served as commissioner of the Minnesota Department of Commerce from 1991 to 1993. McKasy and his wife also owned the McKasy Travel Agency. McKasy died at his home in Mendota Heights, Minnesota.
