= Tina Smith =

American politician (born 1958)

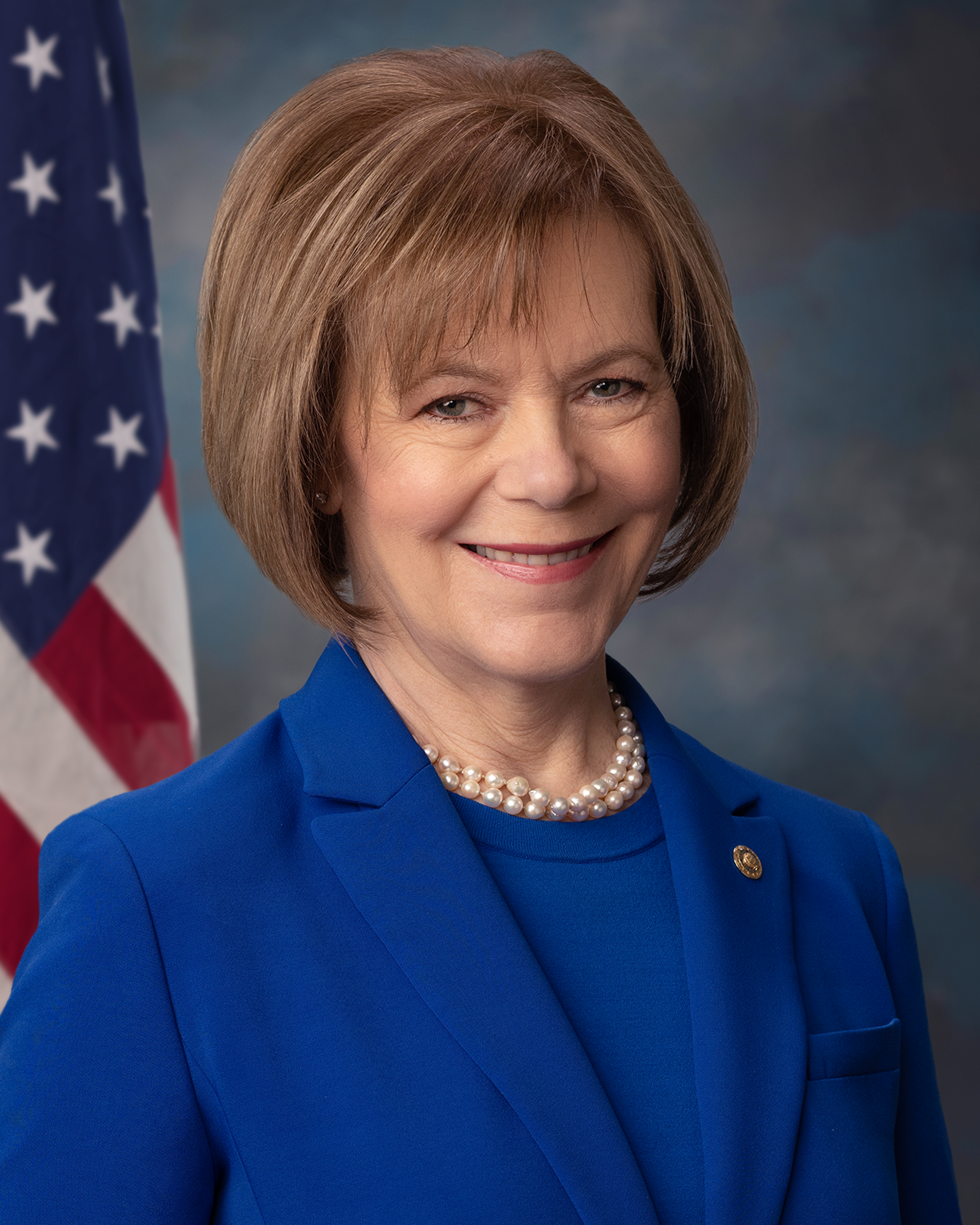
- Official portrait, 2019

United States Senator from Minnesota
- Incumbent
- Assumed office January 3, 2018 Serving with Amy Klobuchar
- Preceded by: Al Franken

48th Lieutenant Governor of Minnesota
- In office January 5, 2015 – January 2, 2018
- Governor: Mark Dayton
- Preceded by: Yvonne Prettner Solon
- Succeeded by: Michelle Fischbach

Personal details
- Born: Christine Elizabeth Flint; March 4, 1958 (age 68) Albuquerque, New Mexico, U.S.
- Party: Democratic (DFL)
- Spouse: Archie Smith (m. 1984)
- Children: 2
- Education: Stanford University (BA); Dartmouth College (MBA)
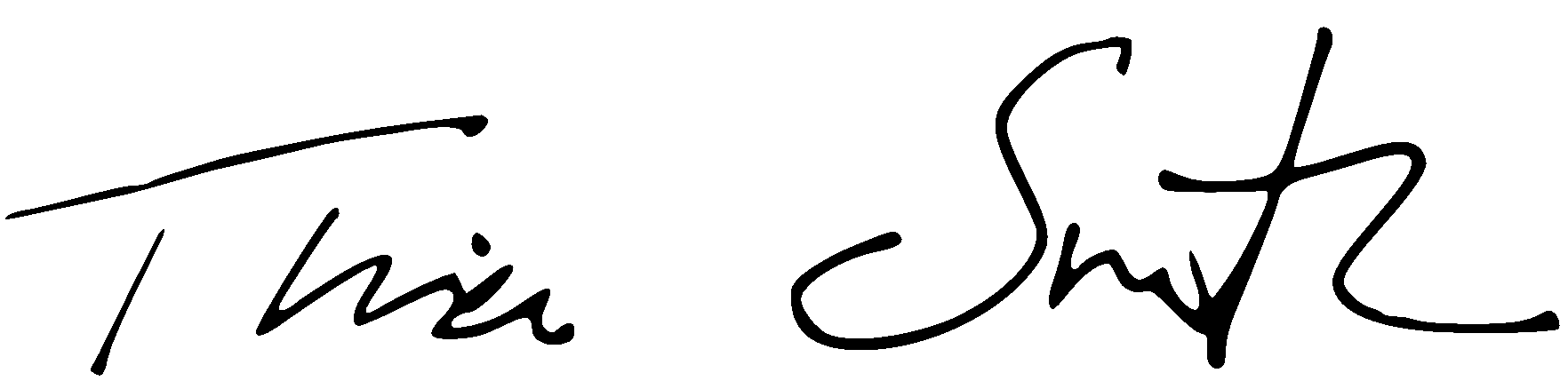
- Signature
- Website: Senate website Campaign website
- Smith's voice Smith supporting the Women's Health Protection Act. Recorded February 28, 2022

Christine Elizabeth "Tina" Smith (née Flint, born March 4, 1958) is an American politician, retired Democratic political consultant, and former businesswoman serving as the junior United States senator from Minnesota, a seat she has held since 2018. A member of the Minnesota Democratic–Farmer–Labor Party (DFL), Minnesota's affiliate of the national Democratic Party, she served from 2015 to 2018 as the 48th Lieutenant Governor of Minnesota under Governor Mark Dayton.

Born in Albuquerque, New Mexico, Smith moved to Minnesota in the 1980s to work for General Mills and later became the vice president of Planned Parenthood of Minnesota. She then began a career as a political consultant and organizer for local Democratic candidates. Smith managed Walter Mondale's unsuccessful last-minute campaign in the 2002 United States Senate election in Minnesota after incumbent senator Paul Wellstone died in a plane crash 11 days before the election.

After Mondale lost the Senate election, Smith served as chief of staff to Mayor of Minneapolis R. T. Rybak. She then helped run Dayton's successful campaign for Governor of Minnesota in 2010. After his victory, Dayton named Smith his chief of staff. Later, for Dayton's reelection campaign in the 2014 election, Smith was named as Dayton's pick for lieutenant governor. After winning her first election to public office, Smith served from 2015 to 2018 as Minnesota's 48th lieutenant governor. Dayton then appointed her to fill the U.S. Senate seat vacated by Al Franken's resignation in 2018. She won the 2018 special election and was elected to a full term in 2020.

On February 13, 2025, Smith announced that she would not run for reelection in 2026. She will be succeeded by fellow Democrat Peggy Flanagan, who won the election.

== Early life and education ==
Smith was born on March 4, 1958, in Albuquerque, New Mexico, the daughter of Christine, a teacher, and F. Harlan Flint, a lawyer. She mostly grew up in Santa Fe, New Mexico, attending Manderfield and Acequia Madre Elementary. She finished high school at Redwood High School in Larkspur, California.

Before going to college, Smith worked on the Trans-Alaska Pipeline in Prudhoe Bay, Alaska. She graduated from Stanford University with a Bachelor of Arts degree in political science, and later earned a Master of Business Administration from the Tuck School of Business at Dartmouth College.

== Early career ==
In 1984, Smith moved to Minnesota for a marketing job at General Mills. She later started her own marketing firm, where she consulted with businesses and nonprofits.

In the early 1990s, Smith became involved in local politics, volunteering for DFL campaigns in Minneapolis. She managed Ted Mondale's unsuccessful 1998 campaign for governor. After Minnesota's U.S. Senator Paul Wellstone died in a plane crash weeks before the 2002 election, Smith managed former U.S. Vice President Walter Mondale's campaign for the seat. After Mondale lost a narrow election to Norm Coleman, Smith began working as the vice president of external affairs at Planned Parenthood of Minnesota, North Dakota, and South Dakota.

In 2006, Smith left her job at Planned Parenthood to serve as chief of staff to Minneapolis Mayor R.T. Rybak. In 2010, she was picked to manage Rybak's gubernatorial campaign, which ended after Margaret Anderson Kelliher won the DFL endorsement. Smith then joined the campaign of Mark Dayton, who skipped the endorsing convention and eventually won the DFL primary. After Dayton defeated Republican Tom Emmer in the general election, Smith was named a co-chair of the transition. When Dayton took office in January 2011, he appointed Smith as his chief of staff.

== Lieutenant Governor of Minnesota ==
=== 2014 election ===
When Lieutenant Governor Yvonne Prettner Solon announced she would not seek reelection, Dayton selected Smith as his running mate in the 2014 gubernatorial election. He cited Smith's work on passing legislation for the new Minnesota Vikings Stadium, as well as her support for the Destination Medical Center project with the Mayo Clinic in Rochester.

Smith stepped down as Dayton's chief of staff to campaign for lieutenant governor. After being nominated by acclamation at the DFL state convention, and facing only token opposition in the DFL gubernatorial primary, Dayton and Smith defeated Republicans Jeff Johnson and Bill Kuisle in the general election.

=== Tenure ===
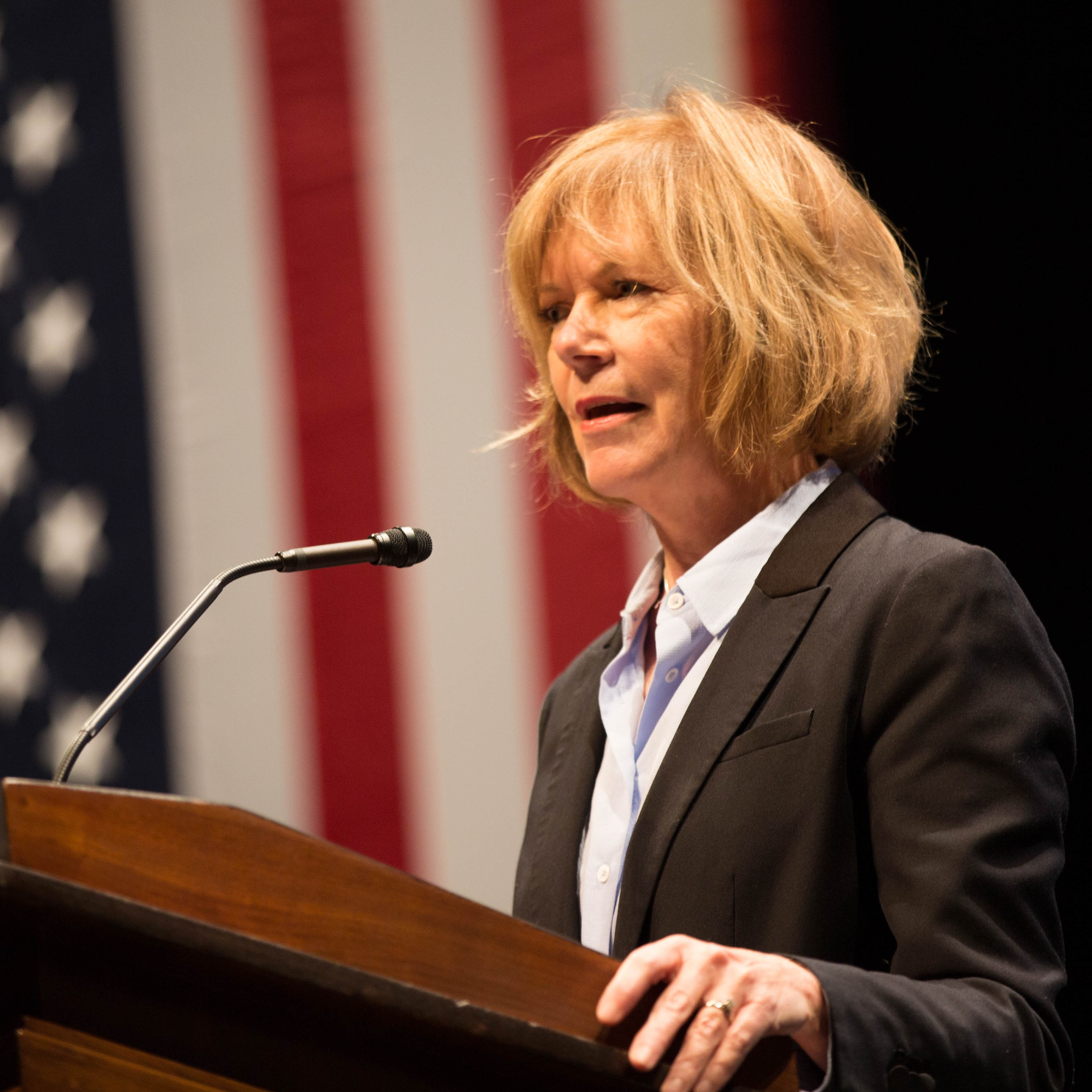
Smith in 2016

Smith took office as lieutenant governor on January 5, 2015, and served until she was appointed to represent Minnesota in the U.S. Senate on January 2, 2018. During her tenure, Smith was described by many political observers as having a much higher profile and playing a much more significant role in legislative negotiations than her predecessors. She spent a significant amount of time traveling the state in support of the priorities of Dayton's administration, including funding for optional preschool for all four-year-olds, transportation infrastructure, and rural broadband internet access. She also served as chair of the Destination Medical Center board until her resignation in December 2017.

In 2016, Roll Call named Smith to its "America's Top 25 Most Influential Women in State Politics" list, citing her high-profile role in the Dayton administration.

Despite widespread speculation to the contrary, Smith announced in March 2017 that she would not run for governor in the 2018 election.

== U.S. Senate ==
=== Appointment ===
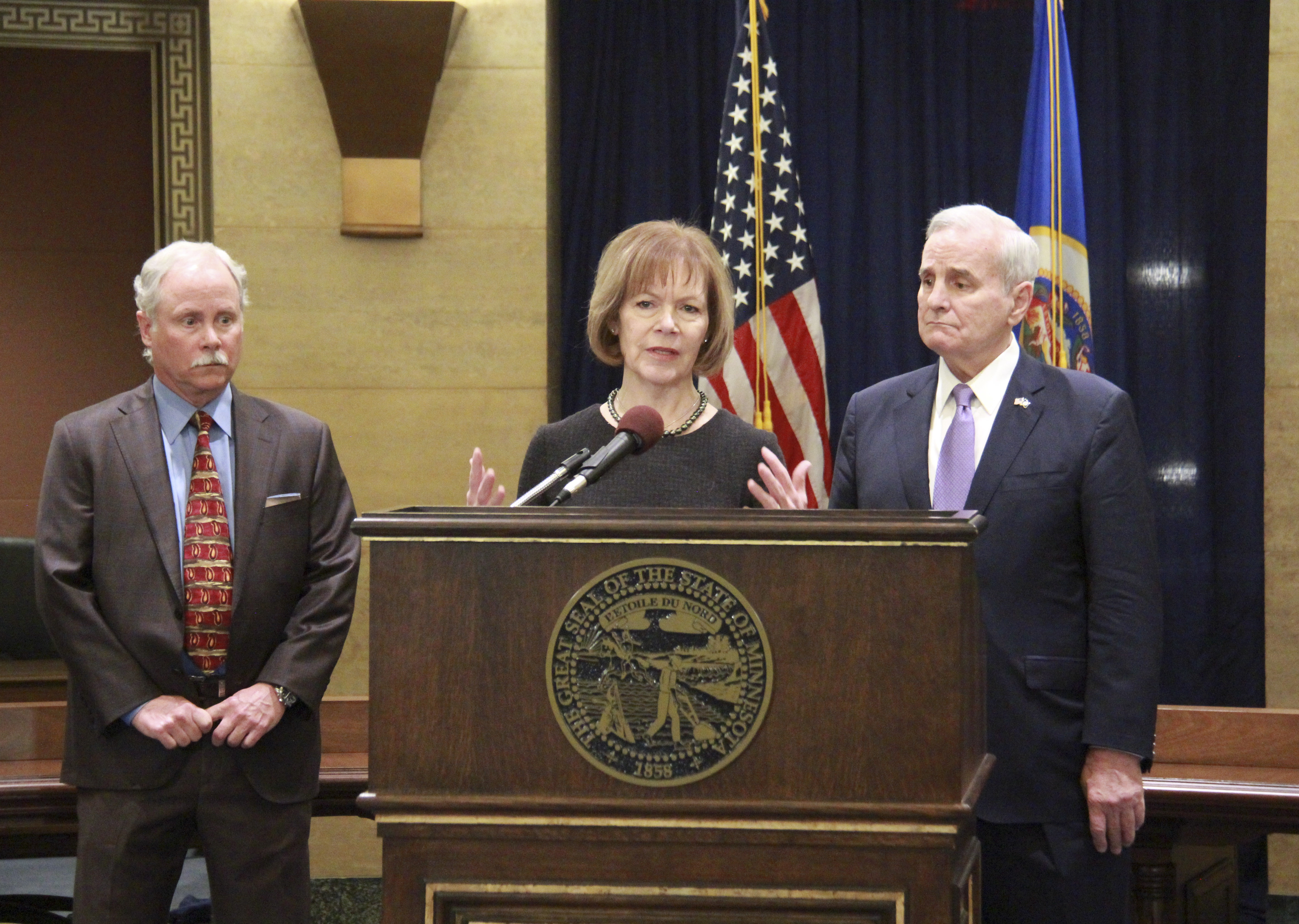
Dayton appointing Smith to the Senate

On December 13, 2017, Governor Dayton announced Smith as his pick to fill the United States Senate seat held by Al Franken, who had announced he would resign amid allegations of sexual misconduct. Democrats in the state immediately united around Smith as the party's candidate in the November 2018 special election to fill Franken's term. Franken resigned on January 2, 2018.

=== Elections ===
==== 2018 special ====
In August 2018, Smith won the Minnesota Democratic–Farmer–Labor Party primary with 76% of the vote. Richard Painter, a White House ethics lawyer during the George W. Bush administration, finished second with 14%.

In the November general election, Smith defeated Republican nominee Karin Housley, a state senator from St. Marys Point, with 53% of the vote to Housley's 42%.

==== 2020 ====
Minnesota was seen as a swing state in the 2020 presidential election, which made Smith a swing-state Democrat up for reelection. Her campaign focused on delivering results for Minnesotans on local issues, such as farming in southern Minnesota, police brutality in wake of the George Floyd protests, and North Shore drilling in the Duluth area, and took strong positions on national issues such as the Amy Coney Barrett Supreme Court nomination. Smith defeated Republican nominee Jason Lewis with 48.8% of the vote to Lewis's 43.5%, thus winning her first full six-year Senate term.

=== Tenure ===
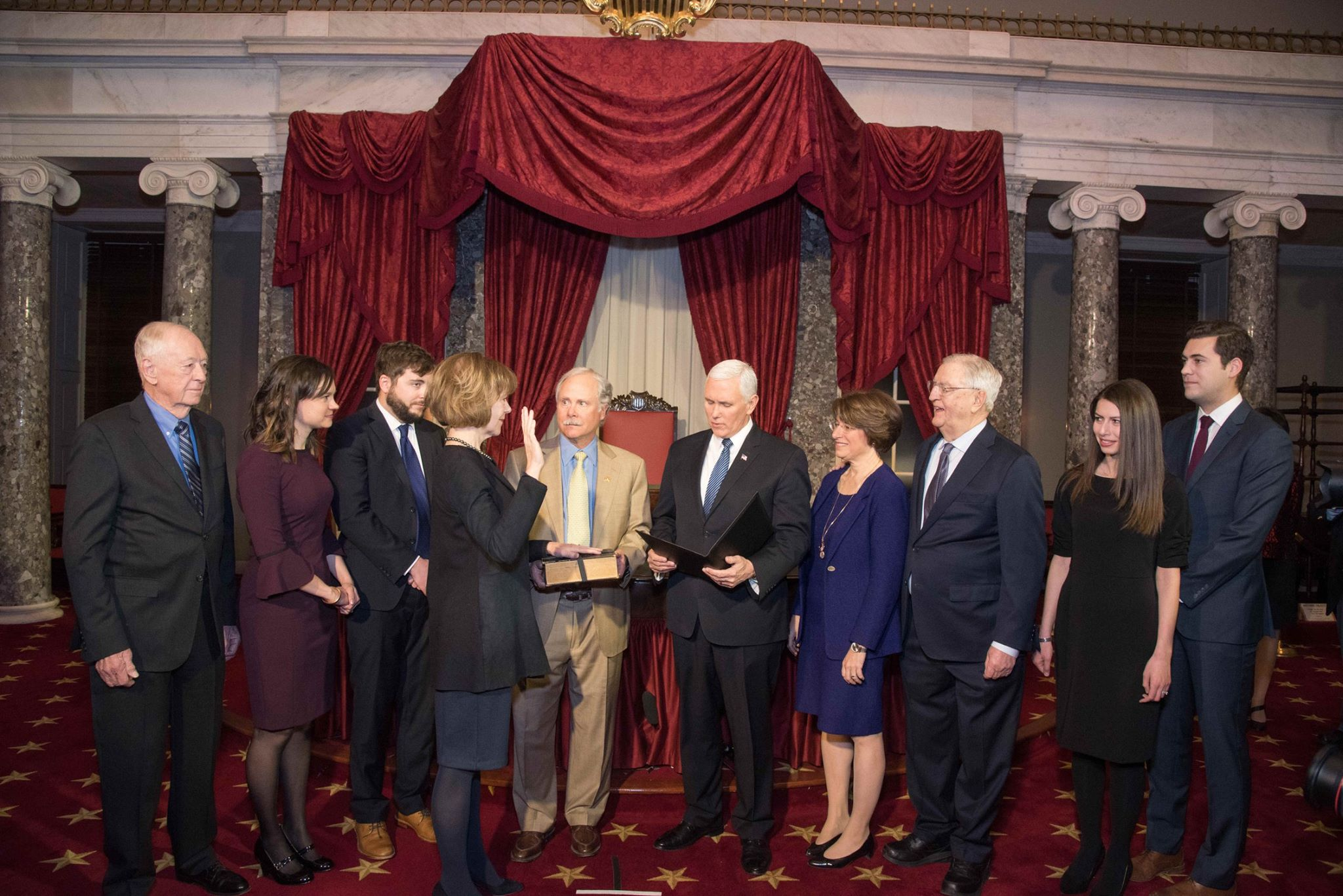
Smith being sworn into the Senate by Vice President Mike Pence on January 3, 2018

With Vice President Mike Pence administering the oath of office, Smith was officially sworn in as a U.S. Senator on January 3, 2018, alongside Doug Jones of Alabama. She was accompanied by fellow Minnesota Senator Amy Klobuchar and former Vice President and former Minnesota Senator Walter Mondale.

Smith was participating in the certification of the 2021 United States Electoral College vote count on January 6, 2021, when Trump supporters stormed the United States Capitol. She called the participants in the attack "seditionists" and blamed Trump for inciting the attack. When the Capitol was secure and the Congress returned to session, Smith supported the certification of the count. In response to the insurrection, she called for Trump's immediate removal from office through the invocation of the Twenty-fifth Amendment to the United States Constitution and impeachment, saying that the president needed to be held accountable for the attack and that "he is dangerous to our democracy and to public safety." She said that Representatives Michelle Fischbach and Jim Hagedorn, who objected to certifying the election, "were complicit in pushing for the president's big lie", and also called on Senators Ted Cruz and Josh Hawley to resign for objecting to the certification of the election and spreading falsehoods about election integrity.

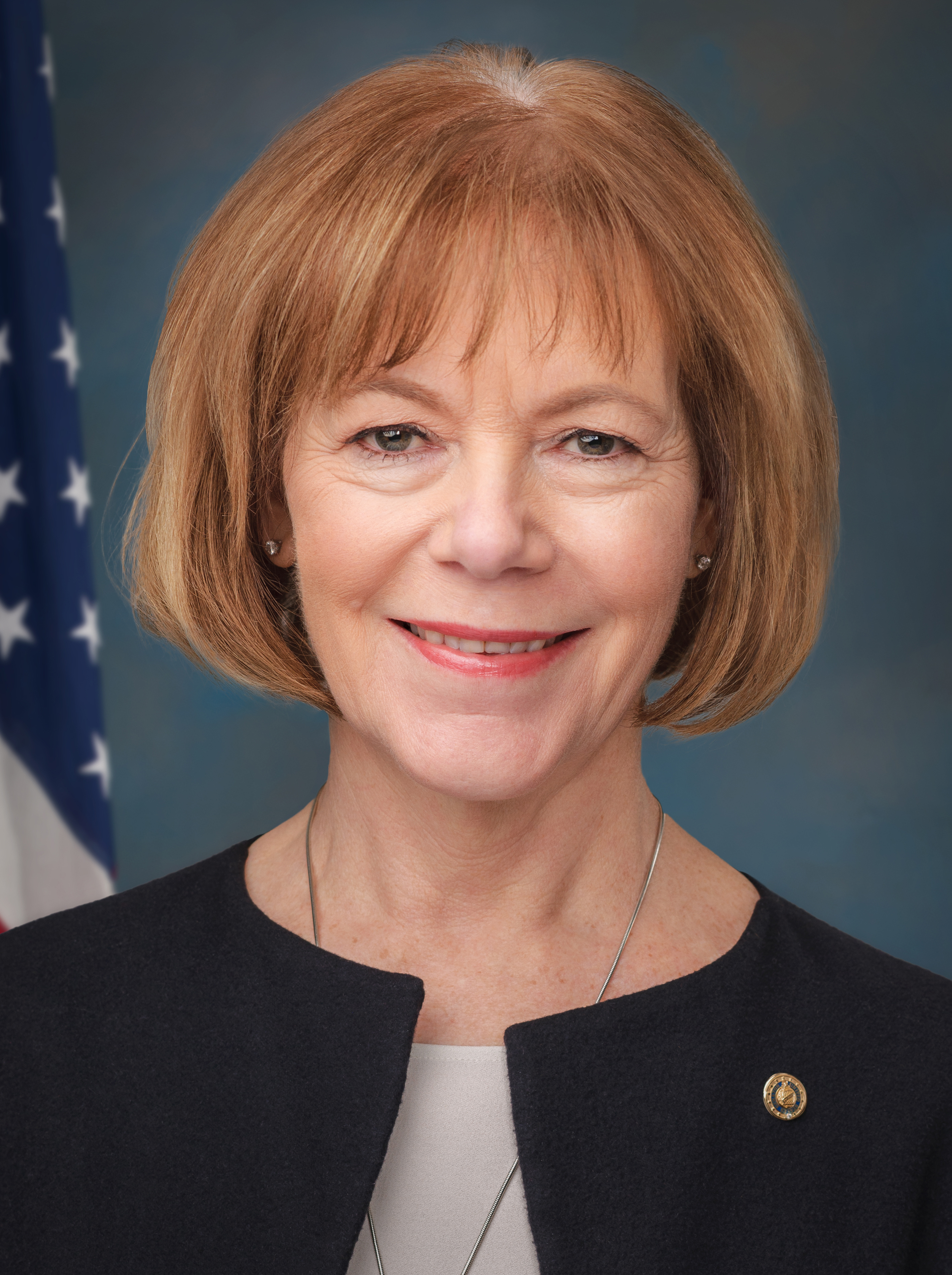
Official portait, 115th Congress

On January 31, 2024, Smith sent a one-minute video to the Washington Press Club Foundation's annual congressional dinner, "roasting" U.S. Representative Dean Phillips over his campaign in the 2024 Democratic Party presidential primaries to challenge President Joe Biden for the Democratic Party's nomination for president.

Smith is a member of the Fight Club in the U.S. Senate.

=== Committee assignments ===
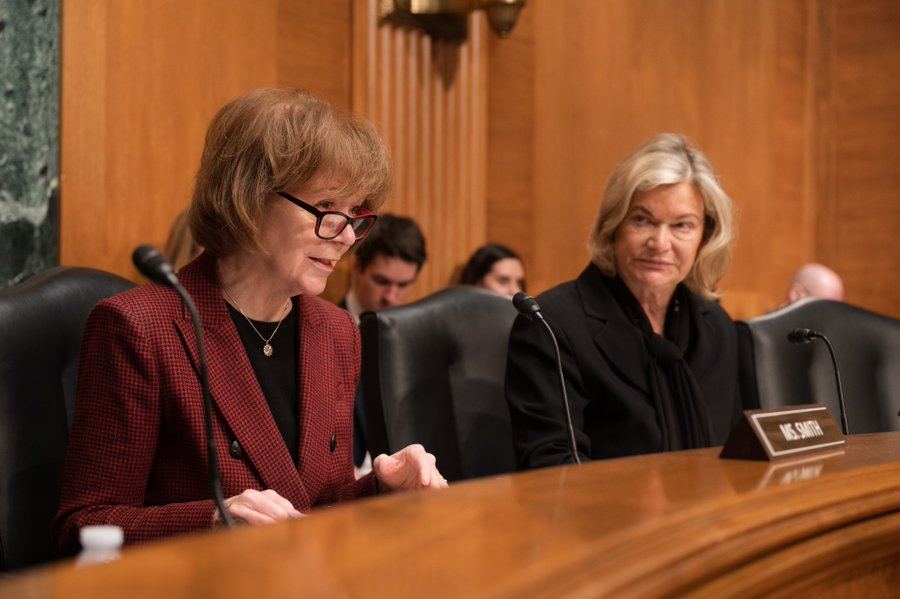
Smith chairs the Housing, Transportation, and Community Development Subcommittee

- Committee on Agriculture, Nutrition and Forestry
  - Subcommittee on Commodities, Risk Management and Trade
  - Subcommittee on Livestock, Dairy, Poultry, Local Food Systems, and Food Safety and Security
  - Subcommittee on Rural Development and Energy (chair)
- Committee on Banking, Housing, and Urban Affairs
  - Subcommittee on Economic Policy
  - Subcommittee on Housing, Transportation, and Community Development (chair)
  - Subcommittee on Securities, Insurance, and Investment
- Committee on Health, Education, Labor and Pensions
  - Subcommittee on Children and Families
  - Subcommittee on Employment and Workplace Safety
- Committee on Indian Affairs

Smith previously served on the Committee on Energy and Natural Resources from January 10, 2018, to January 3, 2019, during the first session of the 116th Congress.

=== Caucus memberships ===
- Rare Disease Caucus

== Political positions ==
=== Abortion ===
Smith supports abortion rights. She was a vice president at Planned Parenthood from 2003 to 2006, where she lobbied against efforts to restrict abortion.

In February 2019, Smith voted against the Born-Alive Abortion Survivors Protection Act, saying that the bill "would override physicians' professional judgment about what is best for their patients" and "put physicians in the position of facing criminal penalties if their judgment about what is best for their patient is contrary to what is described in this bill."

On May 2, 2022, just after Politico obtained and released a 98-page U.S. Supreme Court draft opinion striking down Roe v. Wade, Smith responded in a tweet, "This is bullshit." After the Supreme Court overturned Roe v. Wade on June 24, Senators Smith and Elizabeth Warren wrote a New York Times op-ed calling on President Joe Biden to unblock "critical resources and authority that states and the federal government can use to meet the surge in demand for reproductive health services." On April 2, 2024, Smith published an essay, "I Hope to Repeal an Arcane Law That Could Be Misused to Ban Abortion Nationwide", in The New York Times.

=== Agriculture ===
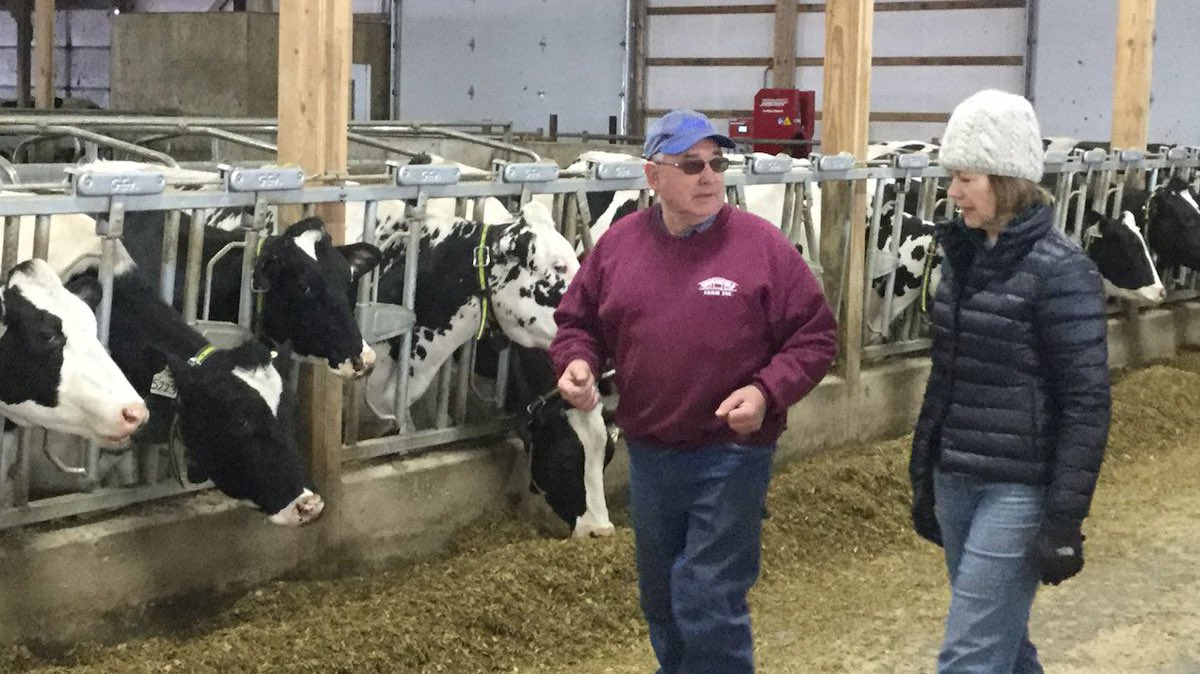
Smith visits the Haubenschild farm in Princeton, Minnesota

In March 2019, Smith was one of 38 senators to sign a letter to Secretary of Agriculture Sonny Perdue warning that dairy farmers "have continued to face market instability and are struggling to survive the fourth year of sustained low prices" and urging his department to "strongly encourage these farmers to consider the Dairy Margin Coverage program."

=== Climate change ===
In November 2018, Smith was one of 25 Democratic senators to have cosponsored a resolution in response to findings of the Intergovernmental Panel on Climate Change (IPCC) report and National Climate Assessment. The resolution affirmed the senators' acceptance of the findings and their support for bold action to address climate change.

Smith was a member of the Senate Democrats' Special Committee on the Climate Crisis, which published a report of its findings in August 2020.

=== Digital assets ===
In a 2021 letter, Smith and four colleagues wrote to Meta CEO Mark Zuckerberg to criticize the company's Diem digital currency project. In the letter, they argued that "stablecoins in general" are "incompatible with the actual financial regulatory landscape." In 2022, Smith and Elizabeth Warren wrote to Fidelity Investments CEO Abigail Johnson to object to a plan to allow for the inclusion of Bitcoin in their 401(k)s.

=== Drug policy ===
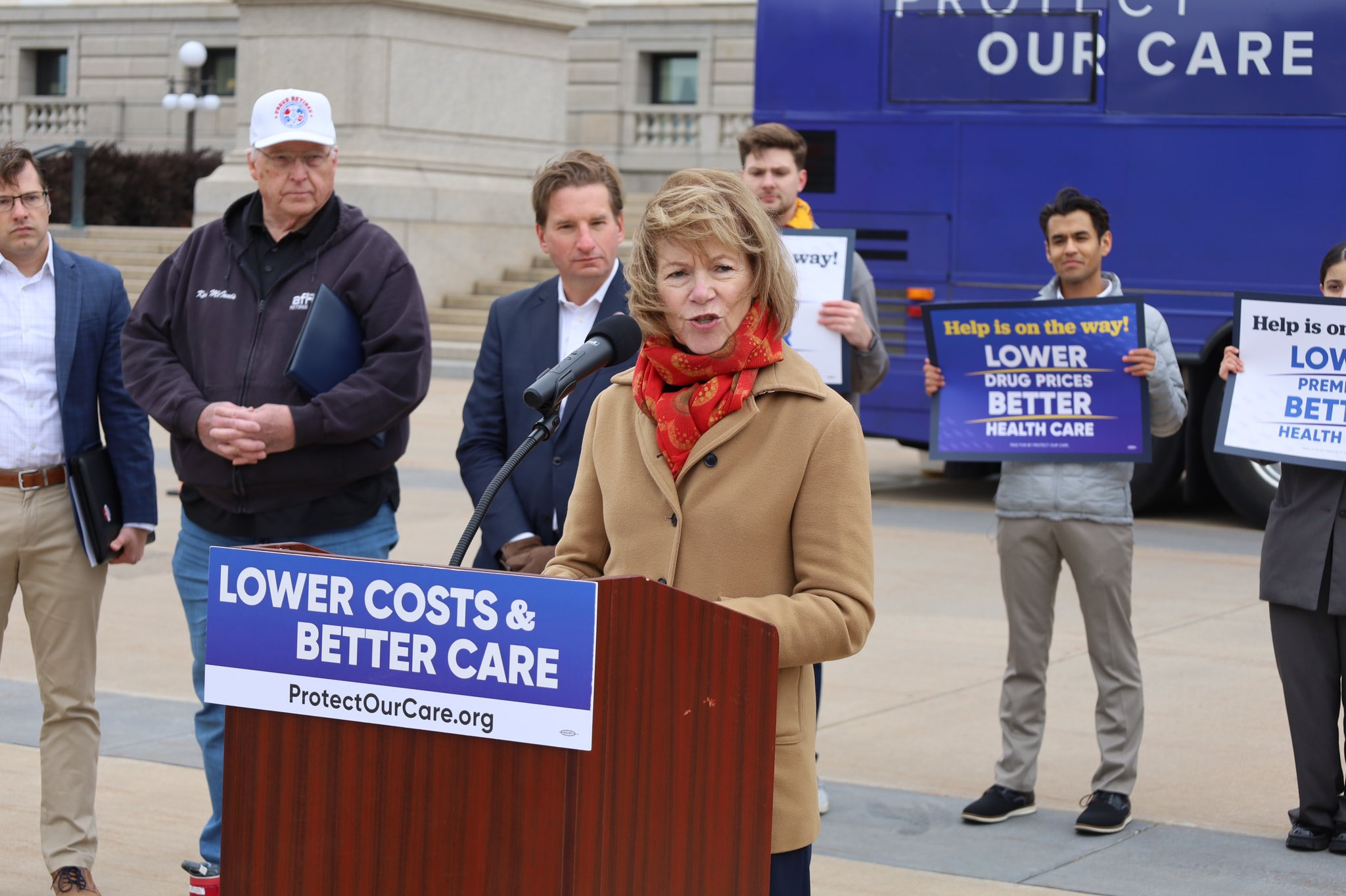
Smith discusses measures to lower the cost of prescription drugs and medical care

In December 2018, Smith was one of 21 senators to sign a letter to Food and Drugs Commissioner Scott Gottlieb stating their approval of the Food and Drug Administration's actions to hinder youth access to e-cigarettes and urging the FDA "to take additional, stronger steps to prevent and reduce e-cigarette use among youth."

In July 2020, Smith introduced the Substance Regulation and Safety Act to legalize cannabis at the federal level and direct federal agencies to develop various regulations regarding cannabis. During a floor speech on racial justice, she called for passage of the bill along with the Marijuana Opportunity Reinvestment and Expungement (MORE) Act to end the "failed policy" of cannabis prohibition that "contributes to mass incarceration and over-policing of communities of color".

=== Foreign policy ===
In April 2019, Smith and 33 other senators signed a letter to President Donald Trump asserting that Trump had "consistently expressed a flawed understanding of U.S. foreign assistance" since becoming president and that by preventing the use of Fiscal Year 2018 national security funding he was "personally undermining efforts to promote U.S. national security and economic prosperity". The senators argued that foreign assistance to Central American countries decreased migration to the U.S. by helping to improve conditions in those countries.

In March 2024, Smith urged the Biden administration to recognize a "nonmilitarized" Palestinian state after the end of the Gaza war. In November 2024, Smith was one of 19 senators to vote to halt the United States' arms sales to Israel. In April 2025, Smith voted for a pair of resolutions proposed by Senator Bernie Sanders to cancel the Trump's administration's sales of $8.8 billion in bombs and other munitions to Israel. The proposals were defeated, 82 to 15.

=== Gun control ===
In March 2018, Smith and nine other senators signed a letter to Senate Health, Education, Labor, and Pensions Committee chairman Lamar Alexander and ranking Democrat Patty Murray requesting they schedule a hearing on the causes and remedies of mass shootings in the wake of the Stoneman Douglas High School shooting.

=== Health care ===
In the lead-up to the 2018 elections, Smith said her record in the Senate showed she would fight pharmaceutical companies to improve people's lives, and that she would continue to fight to lower the cost of healthcare and prescription drugs in Minnesota, for example by making generic drugs more available, preventing people with preexisting conditions from being charged more, and allowing Minnesotans to buy in to Medicare if they are dissatisfied with their options on the insurance market. Smith has endorsed single-payer healthcare.

In December 2018, Smith and 41 other senators signed a letter to Trump administration officials Alex Azar, Seema Verma, and Steve Mnuchin arguing that the administration was improperly using Section 1332 of the Affordable Care Act to authorize states to "increase health care costs for millions of consumers while weakening protections for individuals with preexisting conditions." The senators requested the administration withdraw the policy and "re-engage with stakeholders, states, and Congress."

In January 2019, during the 2018–19 United States federal government shutdown, Smith and 33 other senators signed a letter to Commissioner of Food and Drugs Scott Gottlieb recognizing the efforts of the FDA to address the shutdown's effect on public health and employees while remaining alarmed "that the continued shutdown will result in increasingly harmful effects on the agency's employees and the safety and security of the nation's food and medical products."

In February 2019, Smith and ten other senators signed a letter to insulin manufacturers Eli Lilly and Company, Novo Nordisk, and Sanofi about their increased insulin prices, which had deprived patients of "access to the life-saving medications they need."

=== Housing and infrastructure ===
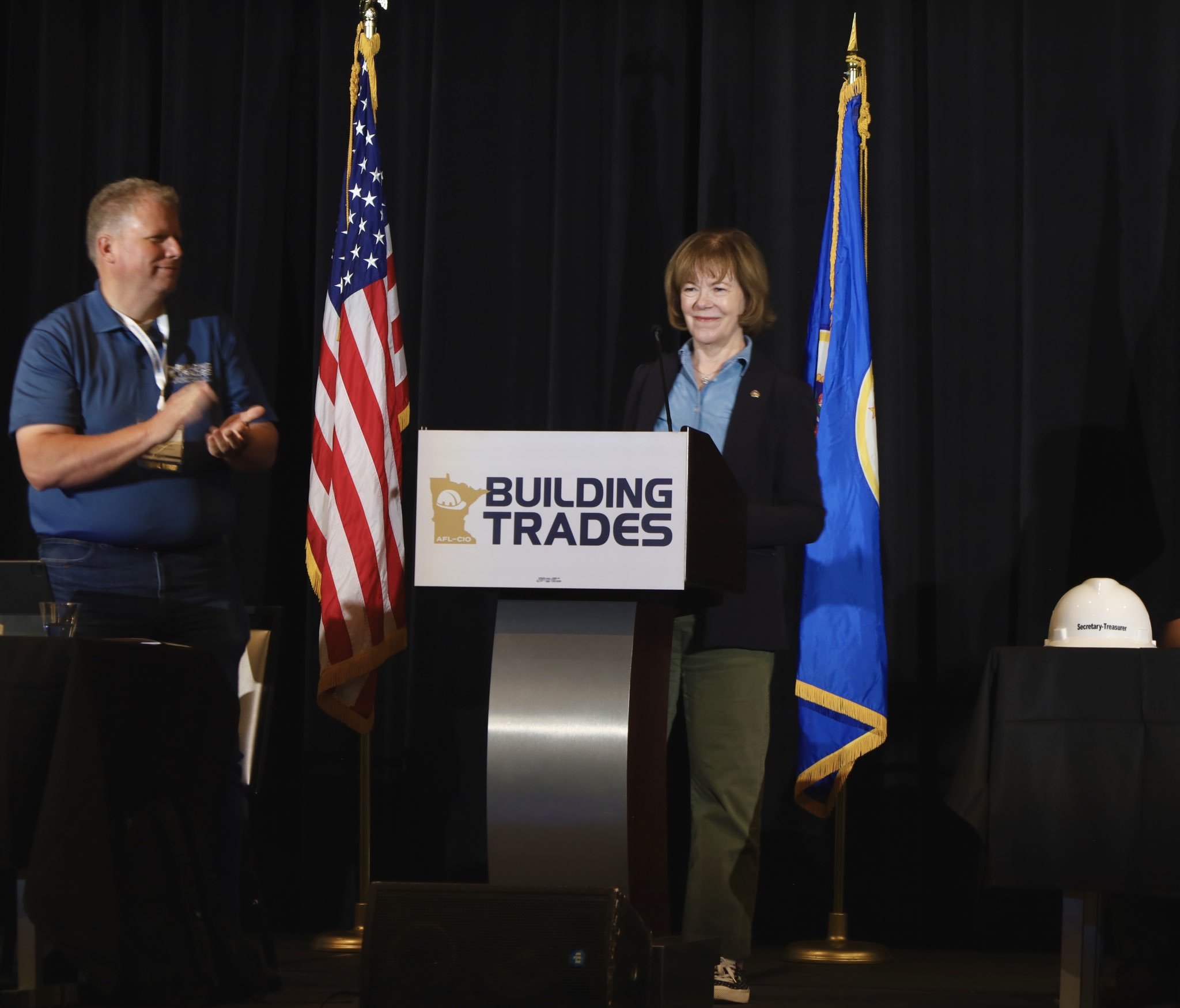
Smith speaks at the Building Trades Council meeting of unionized construction workers in Minnesota, 2024

In April 2019, Smith and 40 other senators signed a bipartisan letter to the housing subcommittee praising the Housing and Urban Development Department's Section 4 Capacity Building program as authorizing "HUD to partner with national nonprofit community development organizations to provide education, training, and financial support to local community development corporations (CDCs) across the country" and expressing disappointment that President Trump's budget "has slated this program for elimination after decades of successful economic and community development." The senators wrote of their hope that the subcommittee would support continued funding for Section 4 in Fiscal Year 2020.

In June 2019, Smith was one of eight senators to sponsor the Made in America Act, legislation that would designate federal programs that had funded infrastructure projects not currently subject to Buy America standards and mandate that the materials used in these programs be domestically produced. Bill cosponsor Tammy Baldwin said the bill would strengthen Buy America requirements and that she was hopeful both Democrats and Republicans would support "this effort to make sure our government is buying American products and supporting American workers."

=== Immigration ===
In August 2018, Smith was one of 17 senators to sign a letter spearheaded by Kamala Harris to Secretary of Homeland Security Kirstjen Nielsen demanding that the Trump administration take immediate action in attempting to reunite 539 migrant children with their families, citing each passing day of inaction as intensifying "trauma that this administration has needlessly caused for children and their families seeking humanitarian protection."

In July 2019, following reports that the Trump administration intended to cease protecting spouses, parents and children of active-duty service members from deportation, Smith was one of 22 senators led by Tammy Duckworth to sign a letter arguing that the protection gave service members the ability "to fight for the United States overseas and not worry that their spouse, children, or parents will be deported while they are away" and that its termination would both cause service members personal hardship and negatively affect their combat performance.

=== LGBTQ rights ===
In October 2018, Smith and 19 other senators signed a letter to Secretary of State Mike Pompeo urging him to reverse the rolling back of a policy that granted visas to same-sex partners of LGBTQ diplomats who had unions that were not recognized by their home countries, writing that too many places around the world have seen LGBTQ individuals "subjected to discrimination and unspeakable violence, and receive little or no protection from the law or local authorities" and that refusing to let LGBTQ diplomats bring their partners to the US would be equivalent of upholding "the discriminatory policies of many countries around the world."

=== Railroad safety ===
In June 2019, Smith and nine other senators cosponsored the Safe Freight Act, a bill that would require freight trains to have one or more certified conductors and a certified engineer on board who can collaborate on how to protect the train and people living near the tracks. The legislation was meant to correct a Federal Railroad Administration rollback of a proposed rule intended to establish safety standards.

== Personal life ==
Smith's husband, Archie Smith, is an independent investor, focusing largely on health care and medical companies. The couple have two sons.

In May 2019, during a speech on the Senate floor, Smith described her experiences with getting help in college and in her early 30s for depression.

On July 16, 2025, feeling ill, Smith was hospitalized and kept overnight for observation.

=== Awards ===
Smith received the Joan and Walter Mondale Award for Public Service at the 2026 Humphrey-Mondale Awards.

== Electoral history ==
2014 Democratic gubernatorial primary election results
Party	Candidate	Votes	%
Democratic (DFL)	Mark Dayton/Tina Smith	177,849	92.99
Democratic (DFL)	Leslie Davis/Gregor Soderberg	8,530	4.46
Democratic (DFL)	Bill Dahn/James Vigliotti	4,880	2.55
Total votes		191,259	100

Minnesota gubernatorial election, 2014
Party	Candidate	Votes	%	±%
Democratic (DFL)	Mark Dayton/Tina Smith (incumbent)	989,113	50.07%	+6.44%
Republican	Jeff Johnson/Bill Kuisle	879,257	44.51%	+1.30%
Independence	Hannah Nicollet/Tim Gieseke	56,900	2.88%	−9.06%
Grassroots	Chris Wright/David Daniels	31,259	1.58%	+1.22%
Libertarian	Chris Holbrook/Chris Dock	18,082	0.92%	N/A
Write-in		795	0.04%	-0.05%
Total votes		1,975,406	100.0%	N/A
Democratic (DFL) hold				

Democratic–Farmer–Labor Party primary results, Minnesota 2018
Party	Candidate	Votes	%
Democratic (DFL)	Tina Smith (incumbent)	433,705	76.06%
Democratic (DFL)	Richard Painter	78,193	13.71%
Democratic (DFL)	Ali Chehem Ali	18,897	3.31%
Democratic (DFL)	Gregg Iverson	17,825	3.13%
Democratic (DFL)	Nick Leonard	16,529	2.90%
Democratic (DFL)	Christopher Seymore	5,041	0.88%
Total votes		570,190	100%

United States Senate special election in Minnesota, 2018
Party	Candidate	Votes	%	±%
Democratic (DFL)	Tina Smith (incumbent)	1,370,540	52.97%	−0.18%
Republican	Karin Housley	1,095,777	42.35%	−0.56%
Legal Marijuana Now	Sarah Wellington	95,614	3.70%	N/A
Independent	Jerry Trooien	24,324	0.94%	N/A
Write-in		1,101	0.04%	N/A
Total votes		2,587,356	100.0%	N/A
Democratic (DFL) hold				

Democratic–Farmer–Labor Party primary results, Minnesota, 2020
Party	Candidate	Votes	%
Democratic (DFL)	Tina Smith (incumbent)	497,498	87.1%
Democratic (DFL)	Paula Overby	30,497	5.3%
Democratic (DFL)	Ahmad Hassan	20,037	3.5%
Democratic (DFL)	Steve Carlson	16,429	2.9%
Democratic (DFL)	Christopher Seymore	6,480	1.1%
Total votes		570,941	100.0%

United States Senate election in Minnesota, 2020
Party	Candidate	Votes	%	±%
Democratic (DFL)	Tina Smith (incumbent)	1,566,522	48.74%	−4.23%
Republican	Jason Lewis	1,398,145	43.50%	+1.15%
Legal Marijuana Now	Kevin O'Connor	190,154	5.91%	+2.21%
Grassroots	Oliver Steinberg	57,174	1.78%	N/A
Write-in		2,261	0.07%	+0.03%
Total votes		3,214,256	100.0%	N/A
Democratic (DFL) hold				

== See also ==
- List of female lieutenant governors in the United States
- Women in the United States Senate

== Notes ==
Party political offices
Preceded by Yvonne Prettner Solon	Democratic nominee for Lieutenant Governor of Minnesota; 2014	Succeeded by Peggy Flanagan
Preceded by Al Franken	Democratic nominee for U.S. Senator from Minnesota (Class 2); 2018, 2020	Succeeded by Peggy Flanagan
Political offices
Preceded by Yvonne Prettner Solon	Lieutenant Governor of Minnesota; 2015–2018	Succeeded by Michelle Fischbach
U.S. Senate
Preceded by Al Franken	U.S. Senator (Class 2) from Minnesota; 2018–present Served alongside: Amy Klobuchar	Incumbent
U.S. order of precedence (ceremonial)
Preceded by Catherine Cortez Masto	Order of precedence of the United States as United States Senator	Succeeded by Cindy Hyde-Smith
Preceded by Catherine Cortez Masto	United States senators by seniority 62nd	Succeeded by Cindy Hyde-Smith
