= Karin Housley =

American politician

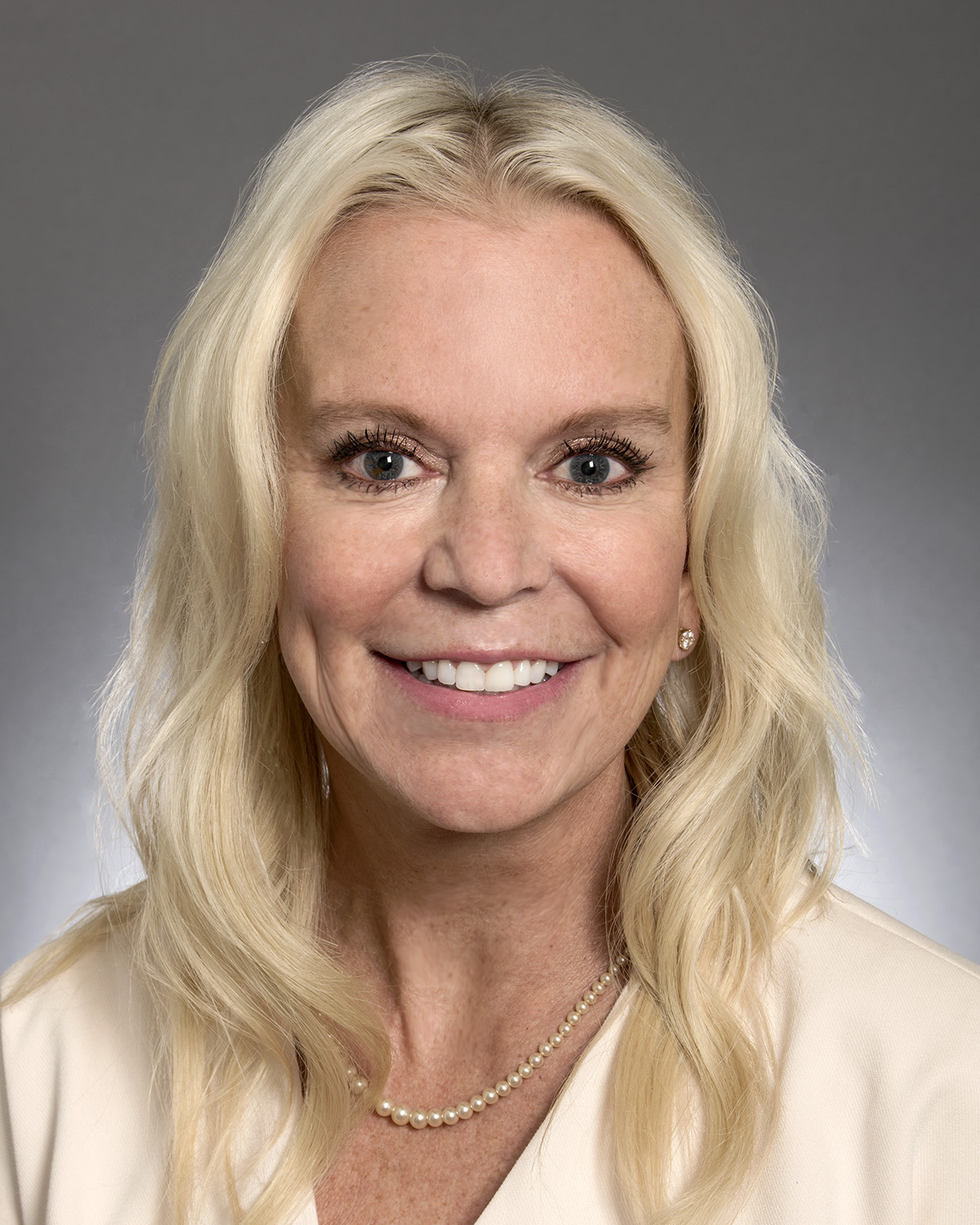

Member of the Minnesota Senate from the 33rd district
- Incumbent
- Assumed office January 8, 2013
- Preceded by: Constituency established

Personal details
- Born: Karin Locke; January 20, 1964 (age 62) South St. Paul, Minnesota, U.S.
- Party: Republican
- Spouse: Phil Housley (m. 1985)
- Children: 4
- Education: Augsburg University (attended); State University of New York, Buffalo (BA)

Karin Housley (/ˈkɑːrɪn ˈhaʊzli/ KAR-in HOWZ-lee; née Locke; born January 20, 1964) is an American politician serving since 2013 as a member of the Minnesota Senate, representing District 33. A Republican, she represents Forest Lake, Stillwater, and the surrounding St. Croix Valley. Housley was the party's nominee in Minnesota's 2018 United States Senate special election, which she lost to Tina Smith.

== Early life, education, and career ==
Housley was born and raised in South St. Paul, Minnesota. She graduated from South St. Paul High School in 1982 and briefly attended Augsburg College before moving to Buffalo, New York, after her high school sweetheart, Phil Housley, was drafted by the Buffalo Sabres. She enrolled at the State University of New York at Buffalo, graduating in 1987 with a B.A. in communication studies. Housley then worked as a news producer for WGRZ and WKBW in Buffalo until 1991.

== Minnesota Senate ==
Housley has represented Forest Lake, Stillwater, and communities along the St. Croix Valley in the Minnesota Senate since 2013. As a state senator, she is best known for her work on issues related to aging and long-term care and veterans. Housley was instrumental in creating the first Minnesota Senate committee on aging, which she chaired. In 2019, Housley authored "landmark" legislation to provide enhanced protections for elderly and vulnerable adults in senior care facilities and licensed assisted living facilities in Minnesota for the first time.

Housley was selected by her colleagues to serve as an assistant majority leader in both the 91st and 92nd sessions of the Minnesota Legislature.

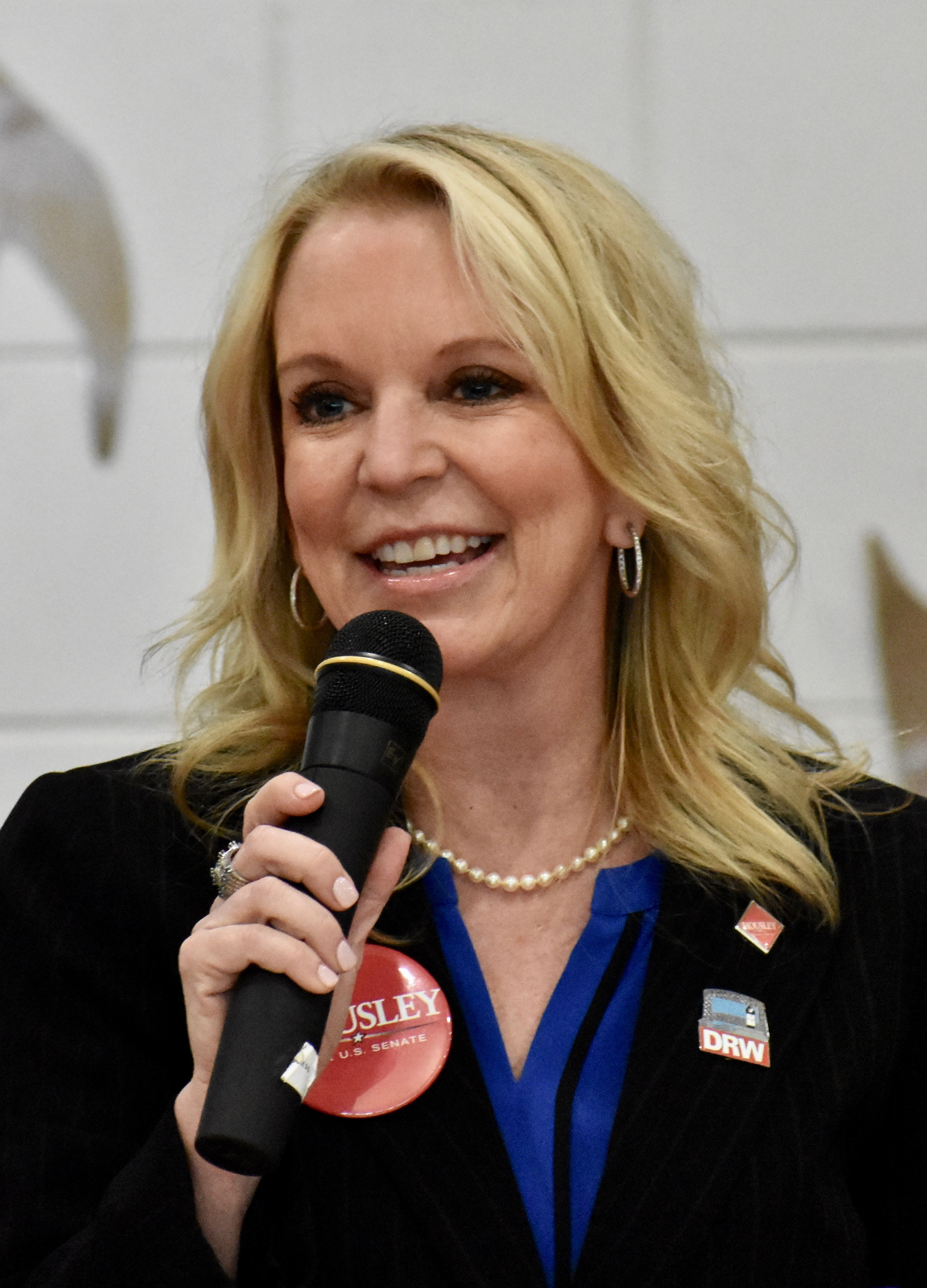
Housley speaking at Minnesota's 8th Congressional District nomination convention in Park Rapids in 2018

== Political campaigns ==
In her first campaign for public office, Housley ran for the Minnesota Senate in 2010 and narrowly lost to DFL incumbent Katie Sieben. After redistricting placed Housley's residence in a new district, she was elected to the Senate in 2012, defeating her opponent by 1% of the vote. She was reelected in 2016 by more than 20 points. Housley was reelected again in 2020 and 2022.

In 2014, Housley was selected by Republican gubernatorial candidate Scott Honour, a businessman from Orono, to be his candidate for lieutenant governor of Minnesota. They lost the 2014 Republican primary to Jeff Johnson.

In December 2017, Housley announced her candidacy for the Republican nomination in the 2018 special election for United States Senate. The seat was vacated by Al Franken, who resigned amid allegations of sexual misconduct. Governor Mark Dayton appointed Lieutenant Governor Tina Smith to fill the vacancy, and Smith announced her candidacy for election to the seat. Housley comfortably won the Republican primary but lost to Smith in the general election. Housley was criticized during the campaign for a 2009 Facebook post in which she made a comparison between then-First Lady Michelle Obama's posture and the chimpanzee in Bedtime for Bonzo.

In March 2019, Housley registered a political action committee to assist conservative candidates running for office in Minnesota, fueling speculation that she would run for the same U.S. Senate seat again in 2020. She ultimately decided against it, instead announcing she would run for reelection to the Minnesota Senate.

== Personal life ==
After living in Buffalo, Winnipeg, St. Louis, Calgary, New Jersey, Washington, D.C., Chicago, Toronto, and Phoenix during Phil's National Hockey League career, the Housleys moved back to Minnesota in 2003. Karin and Phil have four children, all graduates of Stillwater Area High School, and four grandchildren. They reside in Stillwater, where Housley also owns a real estate business. She is Lutheran.

== Electoral history ==
2010 Election for Minnesota's 57th Senate District
| Party | Candidate | Votes | % | ±% |
|---|---|---|---|---|
| Democratic (DFL) | Katie Sieben | 15,812 | 50.94% | −14.03% |
| Republican | Karin Housley | 15,206 | 48.98% | +14.03% |
| n/a | Write-ins | 25 | 0.08% | — |
| Majority | | 606 | 1.96% | −30.02% |
| Democratic (DFL) hold |

2012 Election for Minnesota's 39th Senate District
| Party | Candidate | Votes | % |
|---|---|---|---|
| Democratic (DFL) | Julie Bunn | 22,754 | 49.25% |
| Republican | Karin Housley | 23,385 | 50.62% |
| n/a | Write-ins | 62 | 0.13% |
| Majority | | 631 | 1.37% |
| Republican gain from Democratic (DFL) |

2016 Election for Minnesota's 39th Senate District
| Party | Candidate | Votes | % | ±% |
|---|---|---|---|---|
| Democratic (DFL) | Sten Hakanson | 18,237 | 38.60% | −10.65% |
| Republican | Karin Housley | 28,960 | 61.29% | +10.67% |
| n/a | Write-ins | 25 | 0.11% | —0.02% |
| Majority | | 10,723 | 22.69% | 21.32% |
| Republican hold |

2018 Special election for United States Senate in Minnesota
| Party | Candidate | Votes | % |
|---|---|---|---|
| Democratic (DFL) | Tina Smith | 1,370,540 | 52.97% |
| Republican | Karin Housley | 1,095,777 | 42.35% |
| Legal Marijuana Now | Sarah Wellington | 95,614 | 3.70% |
| Independent | Jerry Trooien | 24,324 | 0.94% |
| n/a | Write-ins | 1,101 | 0.04% |
| Majority | | 274,763 | 10.62% |
| Democratic (DFL) hold |

2020 Election for Minnesota's 39th Senate District
| Party | Candidate | Votes | % | ±% |
|---|---|---|---|---|
| Democratic (DFL) | Josiah Hill | 25,918 | 46.95% | +8.35% |
| Republican | Karin Housley | 29,241 | 52.97% | −8.32% |
| n/a | Write-ins | 45 | 0.08% | —0.03% |
| Majority | | 3,323 | 6.02% | 16.67% |
| Republican hold |

2014 Republican primary election for governor and lieutenant governor in Minnesota
| Party | Candidate | Votes | % |
|---|---|---|---|
| Republican | Marty Seifert and Pam Myhra | 38,851 | 21.10% |
| Republican | Kurt Zellers and Dean Simpson | 44,046 | 23.92% |
| Republican | Merrill Anderson and Mark Anderson | 7,000 | 3.80% |
| Republican | Jeff Johnson and Bill Kuisle | 55,836 | 30.33% |
| Republican | Scott Honour and Karin Housley | 38,377 | 20.84% |
| Majority | | 11,790 | 6.41% |

2018 Republican special primary election for United States Senate in Minnesota
| Party | Candidate | Votes | % |
|---|---|---|---|
| Republican | Karin Housley | 186,384 | 61.95% |
| Republican | Bob Anderson | 107,102 | 35.60% |
| Republican | Nikolay Nikolayevich Bey | 7,355 | 2.45% |
| Majority | | 79,282 | 26.35% |

Party political offices
| Preceded by Mike McFadden | Republican nominee for U.S. Senator from Minnesota (Class 2); 2018 | Succeeded by Jason Lewis |
