= 2018 United States Senate special election in Minnesota =

- November 6, 2018
- Turnout: 63.66%
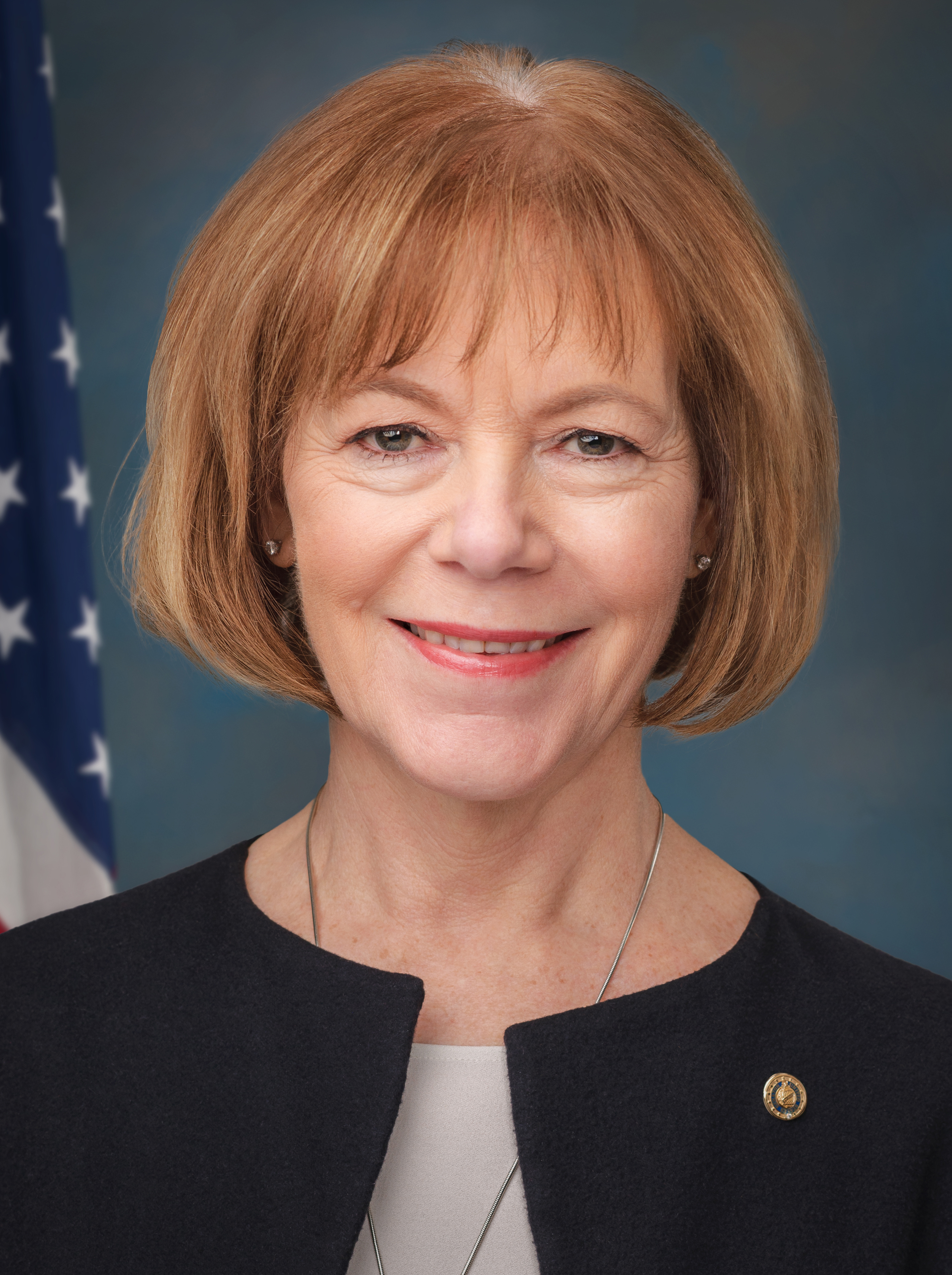

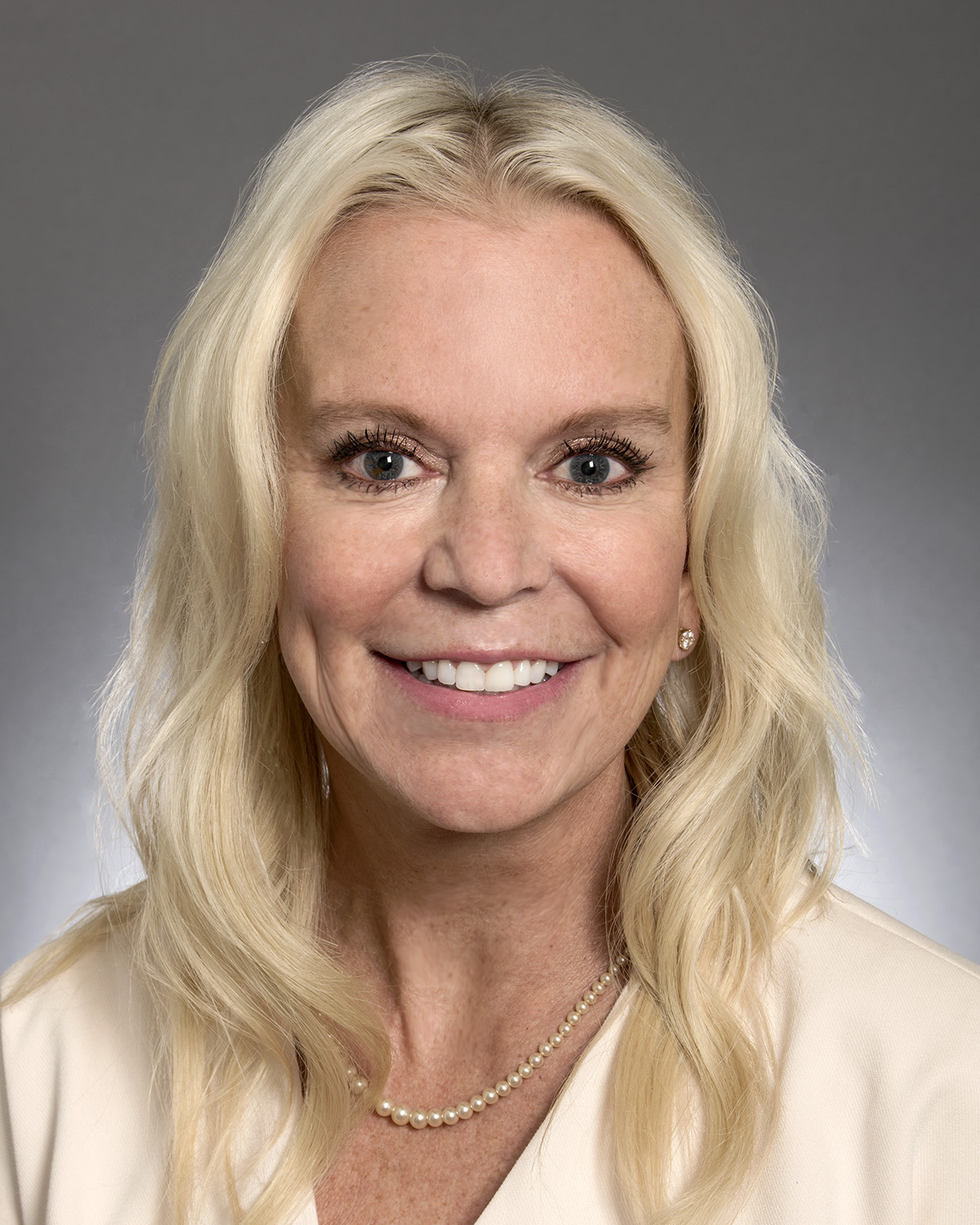
Nominee	Tina Smith	Karin Housley
Party	Democratic (DFL)	Republican
Popular vote	1,370,540	1,095,777
Percentage	52.97%	42.35%
- Smith: 30–40% 40–50% 50–60% 60–70% 70–80% 80–90% >90% Housley: 40–50% 50–60% 60–70% 70–80% 80–90% >90% Tie: 40–50%
U.S. senator before election
Tina Smith (Note: In December 2017, Smith was appointed by Governor Mark Dayton to fill the vacancy caused by the resignation of Senator Al Franken.)
Democratic (DFL)
Elected U.S. Senator
Tina Smith
Democratic (DFL)

The 2018 United States Senate special election in Minnesota took place on November 6, 2018, to elect a United States senator from Minnesota to replace incumbent Democratic senator Al Franken until the regular expiration of the term on January 3, 2021. Facing multiple accusations of sexual misconduct, Franken announced on December 7, 2017, that he would resign effective January 2, 2018. Governor Mark Dayton appointed Franken's successor, Tina Smith, on December 13, 2017, and she ran in the special election. This election coincided with a regularly scheduled U.S. Senate election for the Class 1 Senate seat, U.S. House elections, a gubernatorial election, State House elections, and other elections.

The candidate filing deadline was June 5, 2018, and the primary election was held on August 14, 2018. Smith won the Democratic primary and defeated Republican nominee Karin Housley in the general election.

== DFL primary ==
=== Candidates ===
==== Nominated ====
- Tina Smith, incumbent U.S. senator

==== Eliminated in primary ====
- Ali Chehem
- Gregg A. Iverson, perennial candidate
- Nick Leonard, attorney and activist
- Richard Painter, University of Minnesota Law School professor and former White House ethics lawyer under President George W. Bush
- Christopher Lovell Seymore Sr.

==== Declined ====
- Scott Dibble, state senator
- Keith Ellison, U.S. representative from Minnesota's 5th congressional district (ran for attorney general)
- Melisa Franzen, state senator
- Betty McCollum, U.S. representative from Minnesota's 4th congressional district (ran for re-election)
- Rick Nolan, U.S. representative from Minnesota's 8th congressional district (ran for lieutenant governor)
- Collin Peterson, U.S. representative from Minnesota's 7th congressional district (ran for re-election)
- Jake Sullivan, former National Security Adviser to Vice President Joe Biden
- Lori Swanson, attorney general of Minnesota (ran for governor)
- Patricia Torres Ray, state senator (ran for U.S. House)
- Tim Walz, U.S. representative from Minnesota's 1st congressional district (ran for governor)

=== Endorsements ===
Richard Painter

Local and state politicians

- Arne Carlson, former governor of Minnesota (Republican)

Individuals

- Rosie O'Donnell, comedian and actress

=== Results ===
Results by county Smith: 50–60%; 60–70%; 70–80%; 80–90%

Results by congressional district Smith: 70–80%

Democratic–Farmer–Labor Party primary results
Party	Candidate	Votes	%
Democratic (DFL)	Tina Smith (incumbent)	433,705	76.06%
Democratic (DFL)	Richard Painter	78,193	13.71%
Democratic (DFL)	Ali Chehem Ali	18,897	3.31%
Democratic (DFL)	Gregg Iverson	17,825	3.13%
Democratic (DFL)	Nick Leonard	16,529	2.90%
Democratic (DFL)	Christopher L. Seymore Sr.	5,041	0.88%
Total votes		570,190	100%

== Republican primary ==
=== Candidates ===
==== Nominated ====
- Karin Housley, state senator

==== Eliminated in primary ====
- Bob Anderson, businessman
- Nikolay Nikolayevich Bey

==== Declined ====
- Sarah Anderson, Minnesota state representative
- Michele Bachmann, former U.S. representative
- Michelle Benson, state senator
- Christopher Chamberlin (ran for U.S. House)
- Norm Coleman, former U.S. senator from this seat (endorsed Housley)
- Kurt Daudt, speaker of the Minnesota House of Representatives
- Tom Emmer, U.S. representative from Minnesota's 6th congressional district (endorsed Housley, ran for re-election)
- Paul Gazelka, majority leader of the Minnesota Senate
- Pete Hegseth, veteran, Fox News contributor and candidate for the U.S. Senate in 2012
- Amy Koch, former Minnesota state senator
- Jason Lewis, U.S. representative from Minnesota's 2nd congressional district (ran for re-election)
- Mike Lindell, CEO of My Pillow
- Jenifer Loon, state representative (endorsed Housley)
- Stewart Mills III, businessman and nominee for MN-08 in 2014 and 2016
- Erik Paulsen, U.S. representative from Minnesota's 3rd congressional district (ran for re-election)
- Tim Pawlenty, former governor of Minnesota (ran for governor)
- Joyce Peppin, majority leader of the Minnesota House of Representatives
- Julie Rosen, Minnesota state senator

=== Results ===
Results by county Map legend: Housley—70–80%; Housley—60–70%; Housley—50–60%; Housley—40–50%; Housley/Anderson tie—40–50%; Anderson—40–50%; Anderson—50–60%

Results by congressional district Map legend: Housley—70–80%; Housley—60–70%; Housley—50–60%

Republican Party primary results
Party	Candidate	Votes	%
Republican	Karin Housley	186,384	61.95%
Republican	Bob Anderson	107,102	35.60%
Republican	Nikolay Nikolayevich Bey	7,355	2.45%
Total votes		300,861	100%

== Minor parties and independents ==
=== Candidates ===
- Jerry Trooien (independent), real estate developer
- Sarah Wellington (Legal Marijuana Now Party)

== General election ==
=== Predictions ===
Source	Ranking	As of
The Cook Political Report	Lean D	October 26, 2018
Inside Elections	Likely D	November 1, 2018
Sabato's Crystal Ball	Likely D	November 5, 2018
Fox News	Likely D	July 9, 2018
CNN	Likely D	July 12, 2018
RealClearPolitics	Lean D	November 5, 2018

^Highest rating given

=== Endorsements ===
Karin Housley (R)

U.S. executive branch officials

- Mike Pence, vice president of the United States
- Condoleezza Rice, former secretary of state
- Donald Trump, president of the United States

U.S. senators

- Rudy Boschwitz, former U.S. senator (R-MN)
- Norm Coleman, former U.S. senator (R-MN)
- Joni Ernst, U.S. senator (R-IA)
- David Perdue, U.S. senator (R-GA)
- Marco Rubio, U.S. senator (R-FL)

U.S. representatives

- Tom Emmer, U.S. representative (R-MN-6)
- Newt Gingrich, former U.S. representative (R-GA) and speaker of the House of Representatives

State legislators

- Jim Abeler, state senator
- Tony Albright, state representative
- Bruce Anderson, state senator
- Dario Anselmo, state representative
- Michelle Benson, state senator
- Roger Chamberlain, state senator
- Drew Christensen, state representative
- Gary Dahms, state senator
- Bob Dettmer, state representative
- Rich Draheim, state senator
- Justin Eichorn, state senator
- Sondra Erickson, state representative
- Kelly Fenton, state representative
- Keith Franke, state representative
- Mary Franson, state representative
- Pat Garofalo, state representative
- Mike Goggin, state senator
- Bob Gunther, state representative
- Dan Hall, state senator
- Joe Hoppe, state representative
- Jeff Howe, state representative
- Bill Ingebrigtsen, state senator
- Scott Jensen, state senator
- Brian Johnson, state representative
- Mark Johnson, state senator
- Tony Jurgens, state representative
- Deb Kiel, state representative
- Mary Kiffmeyer, state senator
- Mark Koran, state senator
- Ron Kresha, state representative
- Andrew Lang, state senator
- Sandy Layman, state representative
- Kathy Lohmer, state representative
- Jenifer Loon, state representative
- Bob Loonan, state representative
- Eric Lucero, state representative
- Dale Lueck, state representative
- Andrew Mathews, state senator
- Joe McDonald, state representative
- Jeremy Miller, state senator
- Carla Nelson, state senator
- Scott Newman, state senator
- Marion O'Neill, state representative
- Joyce Peppin, state representative
- Roz Peterson, state representative
- Eric Pratt, state senator
- Jason Rarick, state representative
- Jerry Relph, state senator
- Julie Rosen, state senator
- Carrie Ruud, state senator
- David Senjem, state senator
- Tama Theis, state representative
- Dean Urdahl, state representative
- Paul Utke, state senator
- Bill Weber, state senator
- Nolan West, state representative
- Torrey Westrom, state senator
- Nick Zerwas, state representative

Individuals

- Phil Housley, professional ice hockey coach and former player

Organizations

- Maggie's List
- Minnesota Citizens Concerned for Life
- Minnesota Fraternal Order of Police
- Minnesota State Cattlemen's Association
- National Cattlemen's Beef Association
- National Federation of Independent Business
- National Right to Life Committee
- Police Officers Federation of Minneapolis
- Republican Party of Minnesota
- Susan B. Anthony List
- U.S. Chamber of Commerce

Newspapers

- Duluth News Tribune
- Fairmont Sentinel
Tina Smith (D)

Former U.S. executive branch officials

- Joe Biden, 47th vice president of the United States
- Hillary Clinton, former U.S. secretary of state
- Walter Mondale, 42nd vice president of the United States and former U.S. senator (D-MN)
- Barack Obama, 44th president of the United States

U.S. senators

- Tammy Baldwin, U.S. senator (D-WI)
- Catherine Cortez Masto, U.S. senator (D-NV)
- Dick Durbin, U.S senator (D-IL) and Senate Minority Whip
- Kamala Harris, U.S. senator (D-CA)
- Maggie Hassan, U.S. senator (D-NH)
- Doug Jones, U.S senator (D-AL)
- Amy Klobuchar, U.S. senator (D-MN)
- Jeff Merkley, U.S. senator (D-OR)
- Gary Peters, U.S. senator (D-MI)
- Brian Schatz, U.S. senator (D-HI)
- Elizabeth Warren, U.S. senator (D-MA)

U.S. representatives

- Keith Ellison, U.S. representative (D-MN 5)
- Betty McCollum, U.S. representative (D-MN 4)
- Rick Nolan, U.S. representative (D-MN 8)
- Collin Peterson, U.S. representative (D-MN 7)
- Tim Walz, U.S. representative (D-MN 1)

State and local politicians

- Melvin Carter, mayor of St. Paul
- Mark Dayton, governor of Minnesota
- Peggy Flanagan, state representative
- Eric Garcetti, mayor of Los Angeles

Individuals

- Cecile Richards, activist

Labor unions

- American Federation of State, County and Municipal Employees Council 5
- Communications Workers of America
- Education Minnesota
- Minnesota State AFL–CIO
- Service Employees International Union Minnesota State Council
- United Automobile Workers
- United Steelworkers District 11

Organizations

- Council for a Livable World
- Emily's List
- Feminist Majority Political Action Committee
- Human Rights Campaign
- League of Conservation Voters Action Fund
- Minnesota Democratic–Farmer–Labor Party
- NARAL Pro-Choice America
- National Committee to Preserve Social Security and Medicare
- Natural Resources Defense Council Action Fund
- Population Connection

Newspapers and news websites

- Duluth News Tribune

=== Fundraising ===
Campaign finance reports as of October 17, 2018
Candidate (party)	Total receipts	Total disbursements	Cash on hand
Tina Smith (D)	$8,237,522	$7,308,790	$928,730
Karin Housley (R)	$4,049,032	$3,689,562	$359,470
Source: Federal Election Commission

=== Polling ===
Poll source	Date(s) administered	Sample size	Margin of error	Tina Smith (DFL)	Karin Housley (R)	Sarah Wellington (LMN)	Other	Undecided
Change Research	November 2–4, 2018	953	–	51%	42%	3%	2%	–
Research Co.	November 1–3, 2018	450	± 4.6%	49%	39%	–	2%	10%
SurveyUSA	October 29–31, 2018	600	± 5.3%	48%	40%	–	5%	7%
St. Cloud State University	October 15–30, 2018	420	–	44%	29%	–	–	–
Mason-Dixon	October 15–17, 2018	800	± 3.5%	47%	41%	1%	1%	10%
Change Research	October 12–13, 2018	1,413	–	46%	43%	5%	2%	2%
Marist College	September 30 – October 4, 2018	637 LV	± 4.9%	54%	38%	–	<1%	7%
Marist College	September 30 – October 4, 2018	860 RV	± 4.2%	52%	39%	–	<1%	9%
Mason-Dixon	September 10–12, 2018	800	± 3.5%	44%	37%	2%	2%	15%
SurveyUSA	September 6–8, 2018	574	± 4.9%	48%	39%	–	2%	11%
Suffolk University	August 17–20, 2018	500	± 4.4%	44%	37%	2%	0%	18%
Emerson College	August 8–11, 2018	500	± 4.6%	32%	28%	–	–	41%
Marist College	July 15–19, 2018	876	± 4.0%	49%	35%	–	1%	15%
BK Strategies (R)	June 24–25, 2018	1,574	± 2.5%	48%	39%	–	–	13%

Hypothetical polling

Poll source	Date(s) administered	Sample size	Margin of error	Al Franken (DFL)	Karin Housley (R)	Undecided
Emerson College	August 8–11, 2018	500	± 4.6%	41%	40%	19%

Poll source	Date(s) administered	Sample size	Margin of error	Generic Democrat	Generic Republican	Undecided
BK Strategies (R)	June 24–25, 2018	1,574	± 2.5%	49%	42%	9%

=== Results ===
Smith won the election by 10.62 percentage points. Her margin was similar to that of Democratic gubernatorial nominee Tim Walz, who defeated his Republican opponent by 11.41%. Both of those margins of victory were much smaller than that of senior Senator Amy Klobuchar, who on the same day defeated her Republican opponent by 24.1 points. Smith won by huge margins in the Democratic strongholds of Hennepin County and Ramsey County, home of Minneapolis and St. Paul, respectively. She also managed a 10% margin of victory in suburban Dakota County, just outside Minneapolis, and won St. Louis County, home of Duluth. Housley won most of the state's rural areas. Turnout was high for a midterm election, with over 63% of registered voters in Minnesota casting ballots.

United States Senate special election in Minnesota, 2018
Party	Candidate	Votes	%	±%
Democratic (DFL)	Tina Smith (incumbent)	1,370,540	52.97%	−0.18%
Republican	Karin Housley	1,095,777	42.35%	−0.56%
Legal Marijuana Now	Sarah Wellington	95,614	3.70%	N/A
Independent	Jerry Trooien	24,324	0.94%	N/A
Write-in		1,101	0.04%	N/A
Total votes		2,587,356	100.0%	N/A
Democratic (DFL) hold				

==== Counties that flipped from Democratic to Republican ====
- Aitkin (largest municipality: Aitkin)
- Lincoln (largest municipality: Tyler)
- Pine (largest city: Pine City)
- Fillmore (largest city: Spring Valley)
- Freeborn (largest city: Albert Lea)
- Itasca (largest city: Grand Rapids)
- Chippewa (largest city: Montevideo)
- Grant (largest city: Elbow Lake)
- Houston (largest city: La Crescent)
- Kanabec (largest city: Mora)
- Kandiyohi (largest city: Willmar)
- Le Sueur (largest city: Le Sueur)
- Marshall (largest city: Warren)
- Mille Lacs (largest city: Princeton)
- Pennington (largest city: Thief River Falls)
- Polk (largest city: East Grand Forks)
- Pope (largest city: Glenwood)
- Red Lake (largest city: Red Lake Falls)
- Renville (largest city: Olivia)
- Lac qui Parle (largest city: Madison)
- Big Stone (largest city: Ortonville)
- Swift (largest city: Benson)
- Stevens (largest city: Morris)
- Traverse (largest city: Wheaton)
- Wabasha (largest city: Lake City)
- Waseca (largest city: Waseca)
- Watonwan (largest city: St. James)
- Yellow Medicine (largest city: Granite Falls)

==== By congressional district ====
Smith won four of Minnesota's eight congressional districts. Housley won the other four, including one that elected a Democrat.

District	Smith	Housley	Representative
1st	46%	49%	Tim Walz (115th Congress)
1st	46%	49%	Jim Hagedorn (116th Congress)
2nd	50%	45%	Jason Lewis (115th Congress)
2nd	50%	45%	Angie Craig (116th Congress)
3rd	54%	42%	Erik Paulsen (115th Congress)
3rd	54%	42%	Dean Phillips (116th Congress)
4th	64%	31%	Betty McCollum
5th	77%	18%	Keith Ellison (115th Congress)
5th	77%	18%	Ilhan Omar (116th Congress)
6th	40%	55%	Tom Emmer
7th	40%	55%	Collin Peterson
8th	47%	48%	Rick Nolan (115th Congress)
8th	47%	48%	Pete Stauber (116th Congress)

==== Voter demographics ====
Edison Research exit poll
Demographic subgroup	Smith	Housley	No answer	% of voters
Gender
Men	49	49	2	46
Women	61	37	2	54
Age
18–24 years old	70	28	2	6
25–29 years old	55	42	3	5
30–39 years old	60	38	2	12
40–49 years old	51	45	4	13
50–64 years old	53	45	2	29
65 and older	55	44	1	35
Race
White	53	45	2	89
Black	85	12	3	5
Latino	N/A	N/A	N/A	3
Asian	N/A	N/A	N/A	2
Other	N/A	N/A	N/A	2
Race by gender
White men	46	52	2	41
White women	59	40	1	48
Black men	N/A	N/A	N/A	3
Black women	N/A	N/A	N/A	2
Latino men	N/A	N/A	N/A	1
Latino women	N/A	N/A	N/A	1
Others	N/A	N/A	N/A	4
Education
High school or less	56	43	1	17
Some college education	48	48	4	24
Associate degree	47	51	2	17
Bachelor's degree	59	40	1	26
Advanced degree	69	29	2	16
Education and race
White college graduates	62	37	1	38
White no college degree	46	52	2	51
Non-white college graduates	72	28	N/A	4
Non-white no college degree	77	18	5	7
Whites by education and gender
White women with college degrees	68	30	2	21
White women without college degrees	51	46	3	28
White men with college degrees	55	44	1	17
White men without college degrees	40	58	2	23
Non-whites	75	21	4	11
Income
Under $30,000	63	33	4	14
$30,000–49,999	54	43	3	20
$50,000–99,999	49	48	3	36
$100,000–199,999	54	43	3	23
Over $200,000	N/A	N/A	N/A	7
Party ID
Democrats	96	4	N/A	39
Republicans	9	90	1	32
Independents	53	43	4	29
Party by gender
Democratic men	96	4	N/A	14
Democratic women	95	4	1	25
Republican men	7	91	2	15
Republican women	10	89	1	17
Independent men	47	49	4	16
Independent women	60	36	4	13
Ideology
Liberals	93	4	3	27
Moderates	67	31	2	39
Conservatives	11	87	2	33
Marital status
Married	50	48	2	67
Unmarried	65	33	2	33
Gender by marital status
Married men	47	52	1	31
Married women	52	45	3	36
Unmarried men	55	40	5	15
Unmarried women	74	26	N/A	17
First-time midterm election voter
Yes	53	46	1	12
No	58	40	2	88
Most important issue facing the country
Health care	75	23	2	49
Immigration	23	75	2	22
Economy	32	65	3	19
Gun policy	N/A	N/A	N/A	8
Area type
Urban	66	31	3	40
Suburban	52	45	3	32
Rural	42	56	2	28
Source: CNN

== See also ==
- 2018 Minnesota elections
