= 2014 Minnesota gubernatorial election =

- November 4, 2014
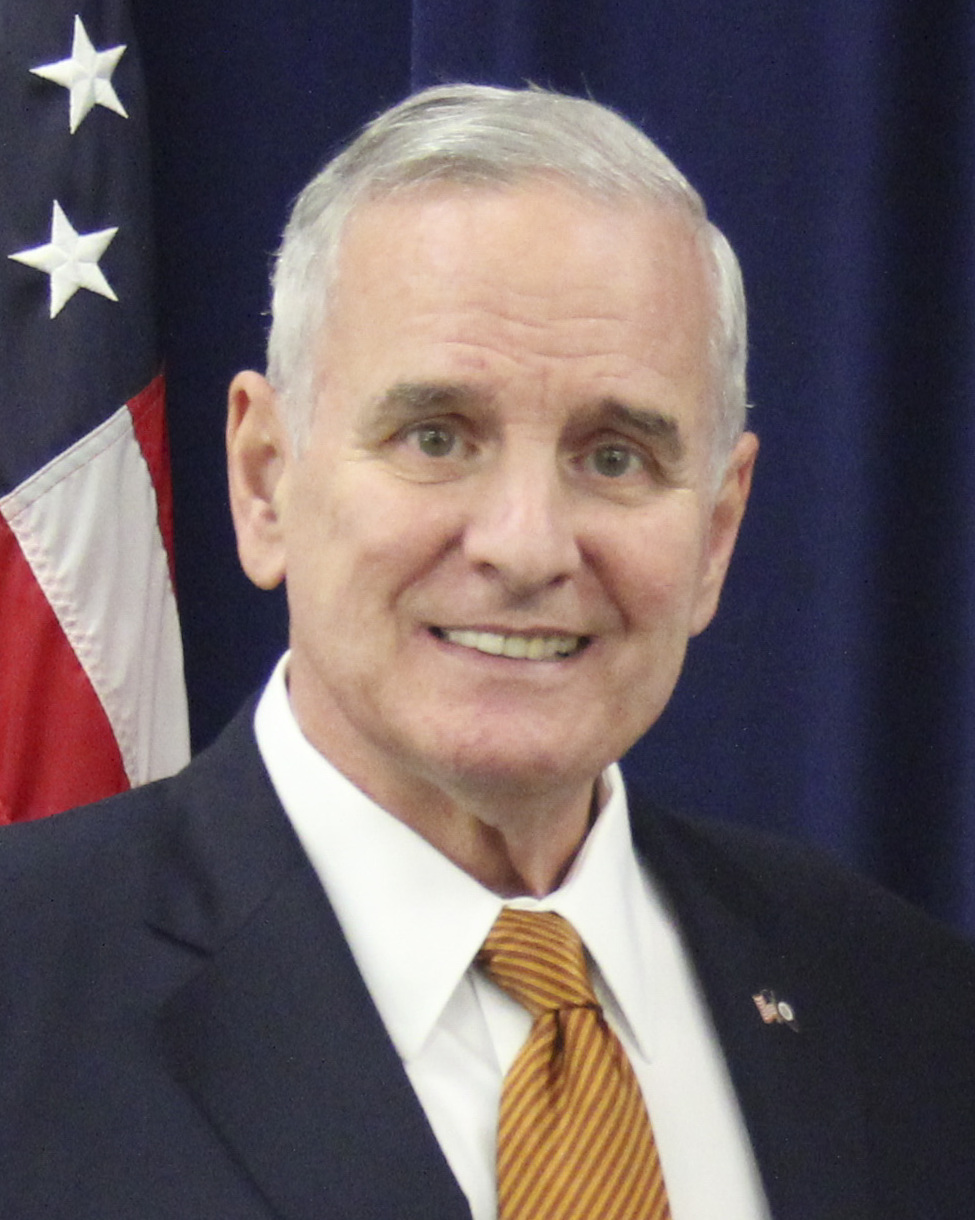

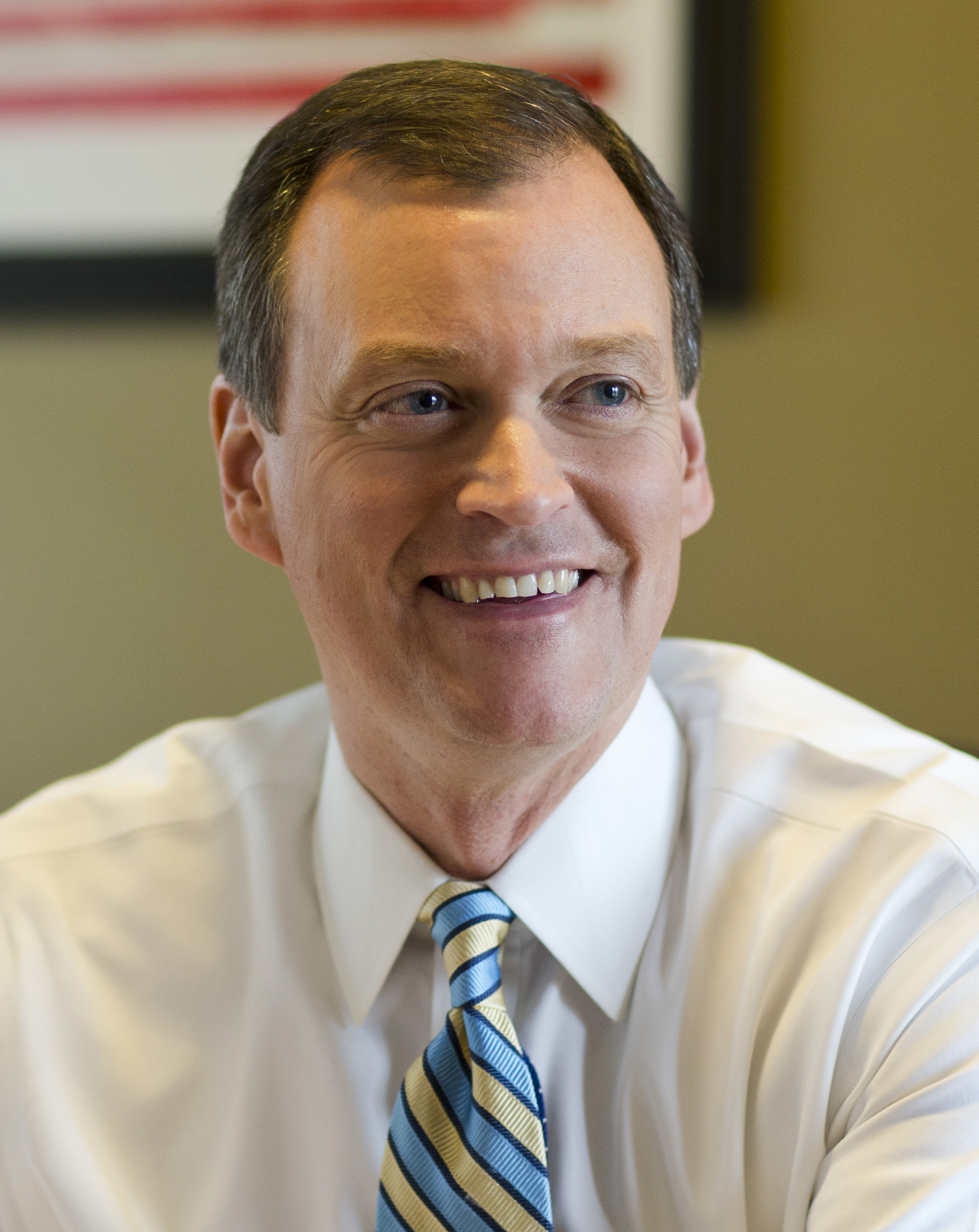
Nominee	Mark Dayton	Jeff Johnson
Party	Democratic (DFL)	Republican
Running mate	Tina Smith	Bill Kuisle
Popular vote	989,113	879,257
Percentage	50.07%	44.51%
- Dayton: 40–50% 50–60% 60–70% 70–80% 80–90% >90% Johnson: 30–40% 40–50% 50–60% 60–70% 70–80% 80–90% >90% Tie: 40–50% 50% No votes
Governor before election
Mark Dayton
Democratic (DFL)
Elected Governor
Mark Dayton
Democratic (DFL)

The 2014 Minnesota gubernatorial election took place on November 4, 2014, to elect the governor of Minnesota. It was held concurrently with the election to Minnesota's Class II U.S. Senate seat, as well as other elections to the United States Senate in other states, elections to the United States House of Representatives, and various state and local elections.

Incumbent Democratic–Farmer–Labor governor Mark Dayton ran for re-election to a second term in office. Incumbent Democratic lieutenant governor Yvonne Prettner Solon retired, and Tina Smith was selected as his new running mate.

Primary elections were held on August 12, 2014. Dayton and Smith won the Democratic primary and the Republicans nominated Hennepin County Commissioner Jeff Johnson and his running mate former state representative Bill Kuisle. In the general election, Dayton and Smith defeated them and several other minor party candidates with just over 50% of the vote. Dayton's victory broke his own record, set in 2010, as the oldest Minnesota gubernatorial candidate to win an election; he was 67. It was also the first gubernatorial race since 1994 in which the winner received a majority of the votes cast.

The election was the first time since 1994 that a third party did not gain more than 6% of the total vote.

== Background ==
Incumbent Republican governor Tim Pawlenty declined to run for a third term in 2010, instead running for the Republican presidential nomination in the 2012 election. State Representative Tom Emmer easily won the Republican nomination, and former U.S. senator Mark Dayton won the DFL nomination with a plurality over State House Speaker Margaret Anderson Kelliher. After a very close race, Dayton defeated Emmer by just 8,770 votes, 0.42% of all votes cast.

Dayton's victory was one of just four that Minnesota Democrats have achieved out of 28 gubernatorial elections during a Democratic presidency. Despite this, and despite his narrow margin of victory in 2010, Dayton was not seen as a top Republican target. The Cook Political Report and The Rothenberg Political Report both rated the race as "safe Democratic", and Daily Kos Elections, Governing and Sabato's Crystal Ball all rated the race as "likely Democratic".

== Democratic–Farmer–Labor primary ==
=== Candidates ===
==== Declared ====
- Bill Dahn
  - Running mate: James Vigliotti
- Leslie Davis, activist
  - Running mate: Gregor Soderberg
- Mark Dayton, incumbent governor
  - Running mate: Tina Smith, Dayton's former chief of staff

=== Results ===
Democratic primary election results
Party	Candidate	Votes	%
Democratic (DFL)	Mark Dayton/Tina Smith (incumbent)	177,849	92.99
Democratic (DFL)	Leslie Davis/Gregor Soderberg	8,530	4.46
Democratic (DFL)	Bill Dahn/James Vigliotti	4,880	2.55
Total votes		191,259	100

== Republican primary ==
Until 2014, Minnesota Republicans had not had a competitive gubernatorial primary since 1924, when Theodore Christianson beat Ole Jacobson by 2.8%, taking 22.8% of the vote in a six-candidate race that saw five candidates finish in double digits. In every election since then, the nominee had won the primary by at least 17.8% and on average by 62.2%.

At the Republican State Convention on May 30–31, 2014, Jeff Johnson received the party's endorsement. Dave A. Thompson withdrew from the race and endorsed Johnson. Scott Honour, Marty Seifert and Kurt Zellers all ran in the August primary, but Johnson prevailed with 30% of the vote.

=== Candidates ===
==== Declared ====
- Merrill Anderson, former director of Reachout Today Inc and candidate for mayor of Minneapolis in 2013
  - Running mate: Mark D. Anderson, former realtor and housing counselor
- Scott Honour, investment banker
  - Running mate: Karin Housley, state senator
- Jeff Johnson, Hennepin County commissioner and former state representative
  - Running mate: Bill Kuisle, former state representative and farmer
- Marty Seifert, former minority leader of the Minnesota House of Representatives and candidate for governor in 2010
  - Running mate: Pam Myhra, state representative
- Kurt Zellers, state representative and former speaker of the Minnesota House of Representatives
  - Running mate: Dean Simpson, former state representative

==== Withdrawn ====
- Rob Farnsworth, teacher and candidate for Minnesota's 8th congressional district in 2010
- Ole Savior, perennial candidate (ran for the U.S. Senate)
- Dave A. Thompson, state senator and former radio host
  - Running mate: Michelle Benson, state senator

==== Declined ====
- Kurt Bills, former state representative and nominee for the U.S. Senate in 2012
- Norm Coleman, former U.S. senator and nominee for governor in 1998
- Matt Dean, state representative and former majority leader of the Minnesota House of Representatives
- Keith Downey, chairman of the Republican Party of Minnesota and former state representative
- Tom Emmer, former state representative and nominee for governor in 2010 (running for Congress)
- Bill Guidera, finance chair of the Republican Party of Minnesota
- David Hann, minority leader of the Minnesota Senate and candidate for governor in 2010
- Karin Housley, state senator (running for lieutenant governor on Scott Honour's ticket)
- Bill Ingebrigtsen, state senator
- John Kline, U.S. representative
- John Kriesel, former state representative
- Susan Marvin, businesswoman
- Erik Paulsen, U.S. representative
- Tim Pawlenty, former governor
- Julie Rosen, state senator
- Ron Schutz, attorney
- Rich Stanek, Hennepin County sheriff

=== Polling ===
Poll source	Date(s) administered	Sample size	Margin of error	Rob Farnsworth	Scott Honour	Jeff Johnson	Julie Rosen	Ole Savior	Marty Seifert	Dave A. Thompson	Kurt Zellers	Other/ Undecided
SurveyUSA	June 5–9, 2014	404	± 5%	—	9%	23%	—	—	14%	—	23%	33% (Note: Other 11%, Undecided 22%.)
Suffolk	April 24–28, 2014	73	± ?	1%	2%	7%	—	1%	10%	5%	8%	68%
Public Policy Polling	October 27–29, 2013	305	± 5.7%	—	6%	8%	10%	—	9%	11%	12%	44%

Hypothetical polling

Poll source	Date(s) administered	Sample size	Margin of error	Norm Coleman	Keith Downey	David Hann	Jeff Johnson	Julie Rosen	Marty Seifert	Kurt Zellers	Other/ Undecided
Public Policy Polling	January 18–20, 2013	275	± 5.9%	57%	4%	4%	4%	5%	4%	5%	17%

=== Debate ===
2014 Minnesota gubernatorial election Republican primary debate
No.	Date	Host	Moderator	Link	Republican	Republican	Republican	Republican	Republican
Key: P Participant A Absent N Not invited I Invited W Withdrawn									
Key: P Participant A Absent N Not invited I Invited W Withdrawn					Merrill Anderson	Scott Honour	Jeff Johnson	Marty Seifert	Kurt Zellers
1	Jul. 30, 2014	Minnesota Public Radio	Mike Mulcahy	YouTube	N	P	P	P	P

=== Results ===
Results by county: Johnson: 20–30%; 30–40%; 40–50%; 50–60%; Zellers: 20–30%; 30–40%; 40–50%; Seifert: 20–30%; 30–40%; 40–50%; 50–60%; 60–70%; 70–80%; 80–90%; 90–100%; Honour: 20–30%; 30–40%

Republican primary election results
Party	Candidate	Votes	%
Republican	Jeff Johnson/Bill Kuisle	55,836	30.33
Republican	Kurt Zellers/Dean Simpson	44,046	23.92
Republican	Marty Seifert/Pam Myhra	38,851	21.10
Republican	Scott Honour/Karin Housley	38,377	20.84
Republican	Merrill Anderson/Mark Anderson	7,000	3.80
Total votes		184,110	100.00

== Independence primary ==
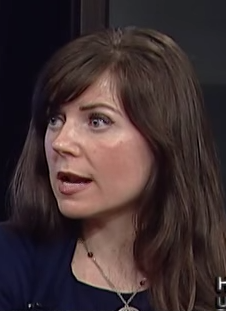
Nicollet in 2014

The Independence Party of Minnesota state convention was held on May 17, 2014, at Minnesota State University, Mankato.

=== Candidates ===
==== Nominee ====
- Hannah Nicollet, software developer
  - Running mate: Tim Gieseke, businessman and candidate for the state house in 2013

==== Declined ====
- Tom Horner, public affairs consultant and nominee for governor in 2010 (endorsed Jeff Johnson)

=== Results ===
Independence primary election results
Party	Candidate	Votes	%
Independence	Hannah Nicollet/Tim Gieseke	5,822	100
Total votes		5,822	100

== Libertarian Party ==
The Libertarian Party of Minnesota state convention was held on April 26, 2014, in Maple Grove.

=== Candidates ===
==== Nominee ====
- Chris Holbrook
  - Running mate: Chris Dock

== Grassroots–Legalize Cannabis Party ==
=== Candidates ===
==== Declared ====
- Chris Wright, computer repair shop owner and nominee for governor in 1998 and 2010
  - Running mate: David Daniels, playwright and performance artist

== General election ==
=== Debates ===
- Complete video of debate, October 1, 2014 - C-SPAN
- Complete video of debate, October 8, 2014 - YouTube
- Complete video of debate, October 9, 2014 - YouTube
- Complete video of debate, October 14, 2014 - YouTube
- Complete video of debate, October 19, 2014 - YouTube

=== Predictions ===
Source	Ranking	As of
The Cook Political Report	Likely D	November 3, 2014
Sabato's Crystal Ball	Likely D	November 3, 2014
Rothenberg Political Report	Safe D	November 3, 2014
Real Clear Politics	Lean D	November 3, 2014

=== Polling ===
Poll source	Date(s) administered	Sample size	Margin of error	Mark Dayton (DFL)	Jeff Johnson (R)	Hannah Nicollet (IP)	Other	Undecided
SurveyUSA/KSTP-TV	October 27–30, 2014	596	± 4.1%	47%	42%	2%	4% (Note: Chris Holbrook (L) 2%, Chris Wright (G) 1%, Other 1%.)	4%
CBS News/NYT/YouGov	October 16–23, 2014	2,430	± 3%	50%	41%	—	1%	9%
Mason-Dixon/Star Tribune	October 20–22, 2014	800	± 3.5%	45%	38%	5%	2%	10%
SurveyUSA/KSTP-TV	October 14–16, 2014	597	± 4.1%	50%	40%	3%	3% (Note: Chris Holbrook (L) 1%, Chris Wright (G) 1%, Other 1%.)	4%
SurveyUSA/KSTP-TV	September 30 – October 2, 2014	577	± 4.2%	51%	39%	4%	2% (Note: Chris Holbrook (L) 0%, Chris Wright (G) 1%, Other 1%.)	4%
CBS News/NYT/YouGov	September 20 – October 1, 2014	2,562	± 2%	49%	42%	0%	1%	8%
Rasmussen Reports	September 29–30, 2014	750	± 4%	50%	40%	—	—	10%
Mason-Dixon/Star Tribune	September 8–10, 2014	800	± 3.5%	45%	33%	1%	1%	20%
CBS News/NYT/YouGov	August 18 – September 2, 2014	3,607	± 2%	48%	41%	—	2%	10%
SurveyUSA/KSTP-TV	August 19–21, 2014	600	± 4.1%	49%	40%	3%	3%	5%
Rasmussen Reports	August 13–14, 2014	750	± 4%	49%	41%	—	—	10%
Gravis Marketing	July 2–3, 2014	879	± 3%	52%	37%	11%	—	—
Public Policy Polling	June 12–15, 2014	633	± 3.9%	47%	36%	—	—	16%
SurveyUSA/KSTP-TV	June 5–9, 2014	1,017	± 3.1%	46%	40%	5%	2%	6%
Suffolk University	April 24–28, 2014	800	± ?	44%	30%	—	—	26%
SurveyUSA/KSTP-TV	February 25–27, 2014	545	± 4.3%	52%	34%	—	—	14%
Public Policy Polling	October 27–29, 2013	895	± 3.3%	48%	37%	—	—	15%
Public Policy Polling	May 17–19, 2013	712	± 3.7%	52%	34%	—	—	14%
Public Policy Polling	January 18–20, 2013	1,065	± 3%	53%	29%	—	—	18%

Hypothetical polling

Poll source	Date(s) administered	Sample size	Margin of error	Mark Dayton (DFL)	Merrill Anderson (R)	Other	Undecided
Public Policy Polling	June 12–15, 2014	633	± 3.9%	47%	35%	—	18%

Poll source	Date(s) administered	Sample size	Margin of error	Mark Dayton (DFL)	Norm Coleman (R)	Other	Undecided
Public Policy Polling	January 18–20, 2013	1,065	± 3%	52%	39%	—	9%

Poll source	Date(s) administered	Sample size	Margin of error	Mark Dayton (DFL)	Kurt Daudt (R)	Other	Undecided
Public Policy Polling	May 17–19, 2013	712	± 3.7%	51%	39%	—	10%

Poll source	Date(s) administered	Sample size	Margin of error	Mark Dayton (DFL)	Keith Downey (R)	Other	Undecided
Public Policy Polling	January 18–20, 2013	1,065	± 3%	53%	30%	—	18%

Poll source	Date(s) administered	Sample size	Margin of error	Mark Dayton (DFL)	Tom Emmer (R)	Other	Undecided
Public Policy Polling	May 17–19, 2013	712	± 3.7%	52%	39%	—	9%

Poll source	Date(s) administered	Sample size	Margin of error	Mark Dayton (DFL)	Rob Farnsworth (R)	Other	Undecided
Suffolk	April 24–28, 2014	800	± ?	45%	28%	—	27%
SurveyUSA	February 25–27, 2014	545	± 4.3%	52%	31%	—	17%

Poll source	Date(s) administered	Sample size	Margin of error	Mark Dayton (DFL)	David Hann (R)	Other	Undecided
Public Policy Polling	May 17–19, 2013	712	± 3.7%	51%	36%	—	13%

Poll source	Date(s) administered	Sample size	Margin of error	Mark Dayton (DFL)	Scott Honour (R)	Other	Undecided
Public Policy Polling	June 12–15, 2014	633	± 3.9%	47%	35%	—	19%
SurveyUSA	June 5–9, 2014	1,017	± 3.1%	47%	37%	10% (Note: Hannah Nicollet (IP) 7%, Other 3%.)	6%
Suffolk	April 24–28, 2014	800	± ?	45%	28%	—	27%
SurveyUSA	February 25–27, 2014	545	± 4.3%	53%	33%	—	14%
Public Policy Polling	October 27–29, 2013	895	± 3.3%	48%	38%	—	15%
Public Policy Polling	May 17–19, 2013	712	± 3.7%	52%	34%	—	15%

Poll source	Date(s) administered	Sample size	Margin of error	Mark Dayton (DFL)	Tim Pawlenty (R)	Other	Undecided
Public Policy Polling	January 18–20, 2013	1,065	± 3%	50%	42%	—	7%

Poll source	Date(s) administered	Sample size	Margin of error	Mark Dayton (DFL)	Julie Rosen (R)	Other	Undecided
Public Policy Polling	October 27–29, 2013	895	± 3.3%	48%	36%	—	16%
Public Policy Polling	May 17–19, 2013	712	± 3.7%	51%	34%	—	15%
Public Policy Polling	January 18–20, 2013	1,065	± 3%	52%	27%	—	21%

Poll source	Date(s) administered	Sample size	Margin of error	Mark Dayton (DFL)	Marty Seifert (R)	Other	Undecided
CBS News/NYT/YouGov	July 5–24, 2014	3,170	± 2%	53%	37%	6%	4%
Public Policy Polling	June 12–15, 2014	633	± 3.9%	47%	36%	—	17%
SurveyUSA	June 5–9, 2014	1,017	± 3.1%	46%	38%	10%	6%
Suffolk	April 24–28, 2014	800	± ?	43%	32%	—	25%
SurveyUSA	February 25–27, 2014	545	± 4.3%	51%	34%	—	15%
Public Policy Polling	October 27–29, 2013	895	± 3.3%	48%	37%	—	16%

Poll source	Date(s) administered	Sample size	Margin of error	Mark Dayton (DFL)	Dave A. Thompson (R)	Other	Undecided
Suffolk	April 24–28, 2014	800	± ?	43%	31%	—	26%
SurveyUSA	February 25–27, 2014	545 RV	± 4.3%	53%	32%	—	15%
Public Policy Polling	October 27–29, 2013	895	± 3.3%	48%	37%	—	15%
Public Policy Polling	May 17–19, 2013	712	± 3.7%	51%	35%	—	13%

Poll source	Date(s) administered	Sample size	Margin of error	Mark Dayton (DFL)	Kurt Zellers (R)	Other	Undecided
Public Policy Polling	June 12–15, 2014	633	± 3.9%	47%	37%	—	16%
SurveyUSA	June 5–9, 2014	1,017	± 3.1%	46%	39%	9% (Note: Hannah Nicollet (IP) 6%, Other 3%.)	5%
Suffolk	April 24–28, 2014	800	± ?	43%	31%	—	26%
SurveyUSA	February 25–27, 2014	545	± 4.3%	52%	31%	—	16%
Public Policy Polling	October 27–29, 2013	895	± 3.3%	48%	38%	—	14%
Public Policy Polling	May 17–19, 2013	712	± 3.7%	53%	35%	—	13%
Public Policy Polling	January 18–20, 2013	1,065	± 3%	52%	29%	—	19%

=== Results ===
2014 Minnesota gubernatorial election
Party	Candidate	Votes	%	±%
Democratic (DFL)	Mark Dayton (incumbent); Tina Smith	989,113	50.07%	+6.44%
Republican	Jeff Johnson; Bill Kuisle	879,257	44.51%	+1.30%
Independence	Hannah Nicollet; Tim Gieseke	56,900	2.88%	−9.06%
Grassroots—LC	Chris Wright; David Daniels	31,259	1.58%	+1.23%
Libertarian	Chris Holbrook; Chris Dock	18,082	0.92%	N/A
Write-in		1,134	0.06%	−0.05%
Total votes		1,975,406	100.0%	
Turnout		1,992,566	50.51%	−5.32%
Registered electors		3,945,136		
Democratic (DFL) hold				

==== Counties that flipped from Republican to Democratic ====
- Grant (largest city: Elbow Lake)
- Houston (largest city: La Crescent)
- Pennington (largest city: Thief River Falls)
- Pine (largest city: Pine City)
- Pope (largest city: Glenwood)
- Stevens (largest city: Morris)
- Watonwan (largest city: St. James)

==== Counties that flipped from Democratic to Republican ====
- Polk (largest city: East Grand Forks)

==== By congressional district ====
Despite losing the state, Johnson won five of eight congressional districts, including two that elected Democrats.

District	Dayton	Johnson	Representative
1st	45%	48%	Tim Walz
2nd	46%	49%	John Kline
3rd	46%	50%	Erik Paulsen
4th	59%	36%	Betty McCollum
5th	71%	23%	Keith Ellison
6th	39%	55%	Tom Emmer
7th	44%	50%	Collin Peterson
8th	51%	43%	Rick Nolan

== See also ==
- 2014 Minnesota elections
