= Bill Kuisle =

American politician and farmer

Member of the Minnesota House of Representatives from the 30B district
- In office 2003–2004

Member of the Minnesota House of Representatives from the 31A district
- In office 1997–2002

Personal details
- Born: January 11, 1958 (age 68) Rochester, U.S.
- Party: Republican
- Spouse: Lisa Behnken
- Children: Isaac, Jenny
- Education: Rochester Community College

Bill Kuisle (born January 11, 1958) is a Republican politician and farmer from Minnesota.

Kuisle earned an associate of arts degree from Rochester Community College and attended University of Wisconsin, River Falls. He graduated from Cardinal Stritch University with a degree in business management. He was a commissioner for Olmsted County before being elected as a state legislator from 1996 to 2004. Jeff Johnson selected Kuisle as a running mate in his 2014 bid for governor.

Party political offices
Preceded by Annette Meeks	Republican nominee for lieutenant governor of Minnesota; 2014	Succeeded by Donna Bergstrom
