= 2014 United States Senate election in Minnesota =

- November 4, 2014
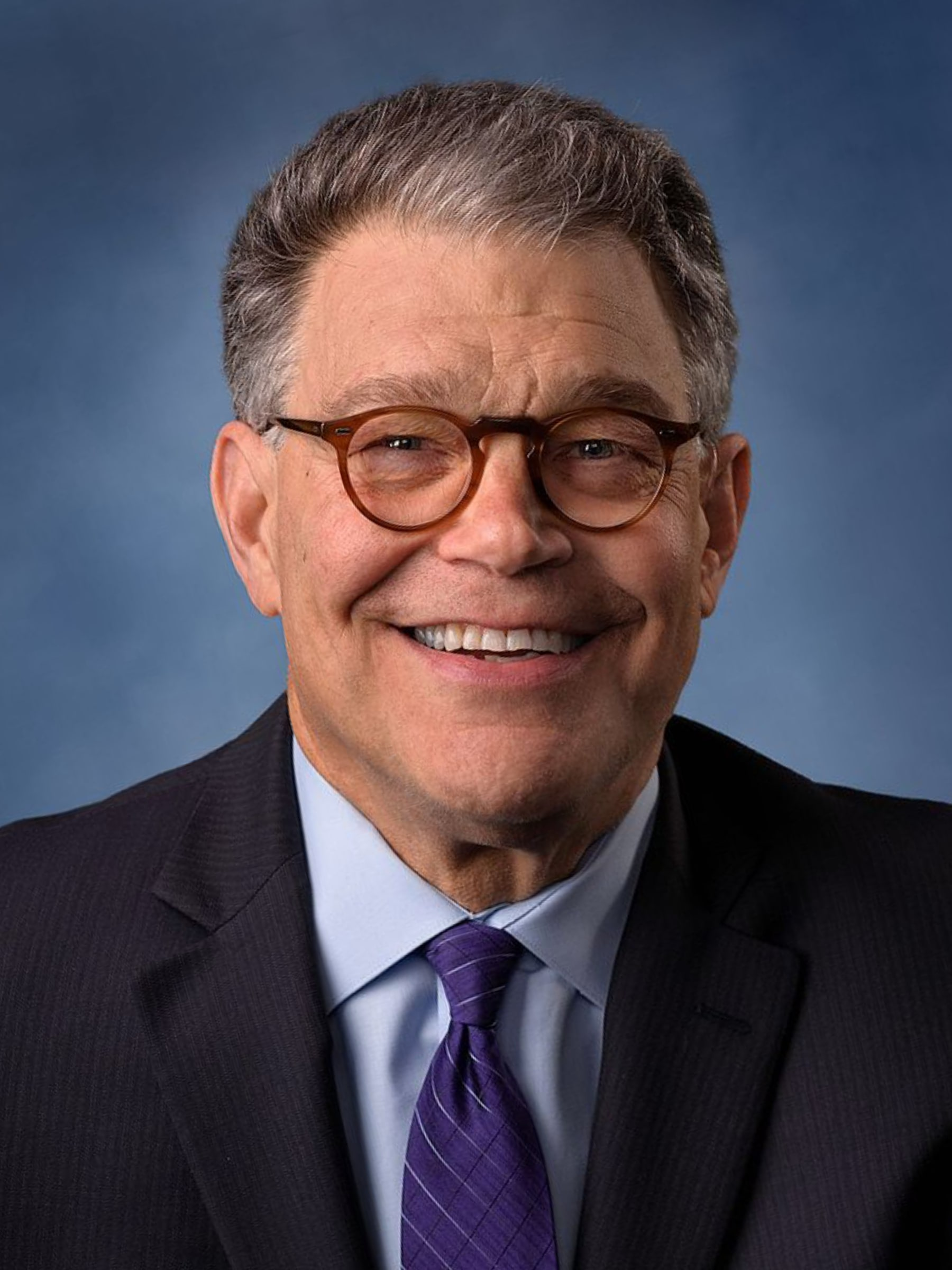

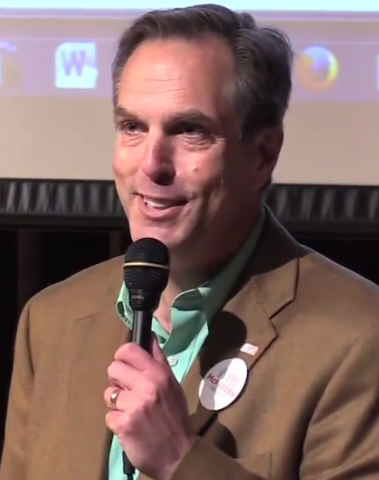
Nominee	Al Franken	Mike McFadden
Party	Democratic (DFL)	Republican
Popular vote	1,053,205	850,227
Percentage	53.15%	42.91%
- Franken: 40–50% 50–60% 60–70% 70–80% 80–90% >90% McFadden: 30–40% 40–50% 50–60% 60–70% 70–80% 80–90% >90% Tie: 40–50% 50% No votes
U.S. senator before election
Al Franken
Democratic (DFL)
Elected U.S. Senator
Al Franken
Democratic (DFL)

The 2014 United States Senate election in Minnesota was held on November 4, 2014, to elect a member of the United States Senate to represent the State of Minnesota, concurrently with the election of the governor of Minnesota, as well as other elections to the United States Senate in other states, elections to the United States House of Representatives, and various state and local elections.

Incumbent Democratic–Farmer–Labor Senator Al Franken ran for re-election to a second term. Primary elections were held on August 12, 2014, in which Franken was renominated and the Republicans picked financial executive Mike McFadden. In the general election, Franken defeated him and Independence Party nominee Steve Carlson and Heather Johnson of the Libertarian Party with 53% of the vote. As of 2026, this is the last time that a male candidate won a U.S. Senate election in Minnesota. This is also the last time that the winner of Minnesota's Class 2 Senate seat won a majority of counties.

== Background ==
Franken challenged incumbent Republican Senator Norm Coleman in 2008. When the initial count was completed on November 18, Franken was trailing Coleman by 215 votes. This close margin triggered a mandatory recount. After reviewing ballots that had been challenged during the recount and counting 953 wrongly rejected absentee ballots, the State Canvassing Board officially certified the recount results with Franken holding a 225-vote lead.

On January 6, 2009, Coleman's campaign filed an election contest and on April 13, a three-judge panel dismissed Coleman's Notice of Contest and ruled that Franken had won the election by 312 votes. Coleman's appeal of the panel's decision to the Minnesota Supreme Court was unanimously rejected on June 30, and he conceded the election. Franken was sworn in as Minnesota's junior senator on July 7, 2009.

Because Franken's margin of victory was so slim, the seat was initially thought to be a top target for Republicans, but Politico reported in a May 2013 article that Franken's high approval rating, his large war chest, and the Republicans' struggle to find a top-tier candidate meant that Franken was the "heavy favorite" in the 2014 election.

== Democratic–Farmer–Labor primary ==
=== Candidates ===
==== Declared ====
- Al Franken, incumbent U.S. senator
- Sandra Henningsgard

=== Results ===
Democratic primary election results
Party	Candidate	Votes	%
Democratic (DFL)	Al Franken (incumbent)	182,720	94.5%
Democratic (DFL)	Sandra Henningsgard	10,627	5.5%
Total votes		193,347	100.0%

== Republican primary ==
At the Republican State Convention on May 30–31, 2014, after ten ballots, Mike McFadden received the party's endorsement. Chris Dahlberg, Monti Moreno, Julianne Ortman and Phillip Parrish had all sought the endorsement but withdrew in favor of McFadden. Only Jim Abeler continued in the race and contested the August primary against McFadden. David Carlson did not participate in the convention after a dispute with party leadership over nominating petitions. He, Patrick D. Munro and Ole Savior also appeared on the ballot.

=== Candidates ===
==== Declared ====
- Jim Abeler, state representative
- David Carlson, veteran and candidate for the U.S. Senate in 2012
- Mike McFadden, financial executive
- Patrick D. Munro
- Ole Savior, perennial candidate

==== Withdrew ====
- Chris Dahlberg, St. Louis County commissioner
- Monti Moreno, bison farmer, former hair salon owner and candidate for the U.S. Senate in 1996
- Julianne Ortman, state senator
- Phillip Parrish, U.S. Navy reservist
- Harold Shudlick, retired U.S. Army chaplain and candidate for the U.S. Senate in 2006 and 2012

==== Declined ====
- Michele Bachmann, U.S. representative
- Laura Brod, former state representative
- Norm Coleman, former U.S. senator
- Chip Cravaack, former U.S. representative
- Bill Guidera, finance chair of the Republican Party of Minnesota
- Pete Hegseth, CEO of Concerned Veterans for America, former executive director of Vets For Freedom and candidate for the U.S. Senate in 2012
- John Kline, U.S. representative
- Jason Lewis, radio talk show host and political commentator
- Erik Paulsen, U.S. representative
- Tim Pawlenty, former governor of Minnesota
- Rich Stanek, Hennepin County sheriff

=== Endorsements ===
Mike McFadden

Individuals

- Norm Coleman, former U.S. senator
- Rod Grams, former U.S. senator
Julianne Ortman

Individuals

- Sarah Palin, former Alaska governor, 2008 Republican vice-presidential candidate

Organizations

- Citizens United
- Conservative Campaign Committee
- Minnesota Gun Owners Political Action Committee
- SHE-PAC

=== Polling ===
Poll source	Date(s) administered	Sample size	Margin of error	Jim Abeler	David Carlson	Chris Dahlberg	David Latvaaho	Mike McFadden	Monti Moreno	Julianne Ortman	Phillip Parrish	Harold Shudlick	Other	Undecided
PPP	October 27–29, 2013	305	±5.7%	12%	—	10%	—	11%	2%	12%	—	—	—	53%
TPC	February 28–March 1, 2014	400	±4.9%	8%	—	4%	—	8%	1%	16%	0%	1%	—	52%
Suffolk	April 24–28, 2014	800	± ?	8%	1%	2%	1%	12%	0%	14%	1%	—	—	63%
SurveyUSA	June 5–9, 2014	404	± 5%	16%	—	—	—	44%	—	—	—	—	19%	21%

Hypothetical polling

Republican primary

Poll source	Date(s) administered	Sample size	Margin of error	Michele Bachmann	Laura Brod	Chip Cravaack	John Kline	Erik Paulsen	Rich Stanek	Other/ Undecided
Public Policy Polling	January 18–20, 2013	275	± 5.9%	45%	4%	13%	19%	11%	2%	6%

=== Results ===
Republican primary election results
Party	Candidate	Votes	%
Republican	Mike McFadden (endorsed)	129,601	71.74%
Republican	Jim Abeler	26,714	14.79%
Republican	David Carlson	16,449	9.10%
Republican	Patrick Munro	5,058	2.80%
Republican	Ole Savior	2,840	1.57%
Total votes		180,662	100.00%

== Independence primary ==
The Independence Party of Minnesota state convention was held on May 17, 2014, at Minnesota State University, Mankato. Businessman Kevin Terrell won the party's endorsement, but lost the primary to Steve Carlson. Carlson did not ask for an endorsement from the Independence Party, and self-identified with the Tea Party. For their part, the Independence Party disowned Carlson, who defended Todd Akin's controversial "legitimate rape" comments and said that George Zimmerman "provided a valuable service" by killing Trayvon Martin.

=== Candidates ===
==== Declared ====
- Jack Shepard, dentist, convicted felon, fugitive and perennial candidate
- Kevin Terrell, business consultant

==== Withdrew ====
- Hannah Nicollet (running for governor)

=== Results ===
Independence primary election results
Party	Candidate	Votes	%
Independence	Steve Carlson	2,148	33.91%
Independence	Kevin Terrell (endorsed)	1,376	21.72%
Independence	Jack Shepard	1,130	17.83%
Independence	Stephen Williams	862	13.60%
Independence	Tom Books	820	12.94%
Total votes		6,336	100.00%

== Libertarian convention ==
The Libertarian Party of Minnesota state convention was held on April 26, 2014, in Maple Grove.

=== Candidates ===
==== Nominee ====
- Heather Johnson

== General election ==
=== Debates ===
- Complete video of debate, October 1, 2014
- Complete video of debate, October 26, 2014

=== Predictions ===
Source	Ranking	As of
The Cook Political Report	Likely D	November 3, 2014
Sabato's Crystal Ball	Likely D	November 3, 2014
Rothenberg Political Report	Likely D	November 3, 2014
Real Clear Politics	Likely D	November 3, 2014

=== Polling ===
Poll source	Date(s) administered	Sample size	Margin of error	Al Franken (DFL)	Mike McFadden (R)	Steve Carlson (IP)	Other	Undecided
Public Policy Polling	May 17–19, 2013	712	± 3.7%	51%	36%	—	—	13%
Public Policy Polling	October 27–29, 2013	895	± 3.3%	49%	38%	—	—	13%
SurveyUSA/KSTP-TV	February 25–27, 2014	545	± 4.3%	50%	40%	—	—	11%
Suffolk University	April 24–28, 2014	800	± ?	44%	29%	—	7%	20%
SurveyUSA/KSTP-TV	June 5–9, 2014	1,017	± 3.1%	48%	42%	—	5%	5%
Public Policy Polling	June 12–15, 2014	633	± 3.9%	49%	38%	—	—	13%
Gravis Marketing	July 2–3, 2014	879	± 3%	51%	35%	13%	—	—
CBS News/NYT/YouGov	July 5–24, 2014	3,185	± 2%	53%	40%	—	2%	4%
Rasmussen Reports	August 13–14, 2014	750	± 4%	50%	42%	—	2%	6%
SurveyUSA/KSTP-TV	August 19–21, 2014	600	± 4.1%	51%	42%	2%	2%	3%
CBS News/NYT/YouGov	August 18 – September 2, 2014	3,607	± 2%	49%	41%	—	1%	9%
Mason-Dixon/Star Tribune	September 8–10, 2014	800	± 3.5%	49%	36%	3%	1%	11%
Rasmussen Reports	September 29–30, 2014	750	± 4%	49%	41%	—	3%	6%
CBS News/NYT/YouGov	September 20 – October 1, 2014	2,562	± 2%	49%	42%	—	0%	8%
SurveyUSA/KSTP-TV	September 30 – October 2, 2014	577	± 4.2%	55%	37%	3%	2%	3%
Public Opinion Strategies	October 5–7, 2014	500	± 4.4%	46%	39%	—	15%	
SurveyUSA/KSTP-TV	October 14–16, 2014	597	± 4.1%	53%	38%	3%	3%	3%
Mason-Dixon/Star Tribune	October 20–22, 2014	800	± 3.5%	48%	39%	3%	1%	9%
CBS News/NYT/YouGov	October 16–23, 2014	2,430	± 3%	51%	41%	—	1%	7%
SurveyUSA/KSTP-TV	October 27–30, 2014	596	± 4.1%	51%	40%	4%	3%	3%

Hypothetical polling

Poll source	Date(s) administered	Sample size	Margin of error	Al Franken (DFL)	Jim Abeler (R)	Other	Undecided
Public Policy Polling	October 27–29, 2013	895	± 3.3%	50%	39%	—	11%
SurveyUSA	February 25–27, 2014	545	± 4.3%	49%	37%	—	14%
Suffolk	April 24–28, 2014	800	± ?	45%	29%	8%	19%
SurveyUSA	June 5–9, 2014	1,017	± 3.1%	48%	39%	8%	5%
Public Policy Polling	June 12–15, 2014	633	± 3.9%	50%	39%	—	11%

Poll source	Date(s) administered	Sample size	Margin of error	Al Franken (DFL)	Michele Bachmann (R)	Other	Undecided
Public Policy Polling	January 21–22, 2012	1,236	± 2.8%	54%	39%	—	7%
Public Policy Polling	May 31 – June 3, 2012	973	± 3.1%	57%	35%	—	8%
Public Policy Polling	September 10–11, 2012	824	± 3.4%	52%	40%	—	7%
Public Policy Polling	October 5–8, 2012	937	± 3.2%	55%	37%	—	8%
Public Policy Polling	January 18–20, 2013	1,065	± 3%	54%	40%	—	7%
Public Policy Polling	May 17–19, 2013	712	± 3.7%	55%	38%	—	7%

Poll source	Date(s) administered	Sample size	Margin of error	Al Franken (DFL)	David Carlson (R)	Other	Undecided
Public Policy Polling	June 12–15, 2014	633	± 3.9%	49%	38%	—	13%

Poll source	Date(s) administered	Sample size	Margin of error	Al Franken (DFL)	Norm Coleman (R)	Other	Undecided
Public Policy Polling	May 31 – June 3, 2012	973	± 3.1%	51%	41%	—	8%
Public Policy Polling	September 10–11, 2012	824	± 3.4%	50%	43%	—	6%
Public Policy Polling	October 5–8, 2012	937	± 3.2%	51%	41%	—	8%
Public Policy Polling	January 18–20, 2013	1,065	± 3%	50%	44%	—	7%

Poll source	Date(s) administered	Sample size	Margin of error	Al Franken (DFL)	Chris Dahlberg (R)	Other	Undecided
Public Policy Polling	October 27–29, 2013	895	± 3.3%	49%	39%	—	12%
SurveyUSA	February 25–27, 2014	545	± 4.3%	49%	41%	—	10%
Suffolk	April 24–28, 2014	800	± ?	45%	28%	8%	20%

Poll source	Date(s) administered	Sample size	Margin of error	Al Franken (DFL)	John Kline (R)	Other	Undecided
Public Policy Polling	January 18–20, 2013	1,065	± 3%	49%	41%	—	11%

Poll source	Date(s) administered	Sample size	Margin of error	Al Franken (DFL)	Jason Lewis (R)	Other	Undecided
Public Policy Polling	May 17–19, 2013	712	± 3.7%	54%	37%	—	9%

Poll source	Date(s) administered	Sample size	Margin of error	Al Franken (DFL)	Monti Moreno (R)	Other	Undecided
Public Policy Polling	October 27–29, 2013	895	± 3.3%	49%	36%	—	15%
SurveyUSA	February 25–27, 2014	545	± 4.3%	50%	36%	—	15%

Poll source	Date(s) administered	Sample size	Margin of error	Al Franken (DFL)	Patrick Munro (R)	Other	Undecided
Public Policy Polling	June 12–15, 2014	633	± 3.9%	50%	35%	—	15%

Poll source	Date(s) administered	Sample size	Margin of error	Al Franken (DFL)	Julianne Ortman (R)	Other	Undecided
Public Policy Polling	May 17–19, 2013	712	± 3.7%	52%	35%	—	14%
Public Policy Polling	October 27–29, 2013	895	± 3.3%	49%	37%	—	14%
SurveyUSA	February 25–27, 2014	545	± 4.3%	49%	41%	—	10%
Suffolk	April 24–28, 2014	800	± ?	44%	29%	7%	20%

Poll source	Date(s) administered	Sample size	Margin of error	Al Franken (DFL)	Erik Paulsen (R)	Other	Undecided
Public Policy Polling	January 18–20, 2013	1,065	± 3%	50%	39%	—	11%

Poll source	Date(s) administered	Sample size	Margin of error	Al Franken (DFL)	Tim Pawlenty (R)	Other	Undecided
Public Policy Polling	January 21–22, 2012	1,236	± 2.8%	49%	43%	—	8%
Public Policy Polling	May 31 – June 3, 2012	973	± 3.1%	52%	41%	—	7%
Public Policy Polling	September 10–11, 2012	824	± 3.4%	50%	43%	—	7%
Public Policy Polling	October 5–8, 2012	937	± 3.2%	51%	42%	—	7%

Poll source	Date(s) administered	Sample size	Margin of error	Al Franken (DFL)	Julie Rosen (R)	Other	Undecided
Public Policy Polling	May 17–19, 2013	712	± 3.7%	52%	36%	—	12%

Poll source	Date(s) administered	Sample size	Margin of error	Al Franken (DFL)	Ole Savior (R)	Other	Undecided
Public Policy Polling	June 12–15, 2014	633	± 3.9%	50%	33%	—	17%

Poll source	Date(s) administered	Sample size	Margin of error	Al Franken (DFL)	Harold Shudlick (R)	Other	Undecided
SurveyUSA	February 25–27, 2014	545	± 4.3%	50%	36%	—	14%

Poll source	Date(s) administered	Sample size	Margin of error	Al Franken (DFL)	Rich Stanek (R)	Other	Undecided
Public Policy Polling	May 17–19, 2013	712	± 3.7%	51%	36%	—	13%

=== Results ===
United States Senate election in Minnesota, 2014
Party	Candidate	Votes	%	±%
Democratic (DFL)	Al Franken (incumbent)	1,053,205	53.15%	+11.16%
Republican	Mike McFadden	850,227	42.91%	+0.93%
Independence	Steve Carlson	47,530	2.40%	−12.75%
Libertarian	Heather Johnson	29,685	1.50%	+1.02%
Write-in		881	0.04%	-0.04%
Total votes		1,981,528	100.00%	N/A
Democratic (DFL) hold				

==== Counties that flipped from Republican to Democratic ====
- Lincoln (largest municipality: Tyler)
- Fillmore (largest city: Spring Valley)
- Grant (largest city: Elbow Lake)
- Houston (largest city: La Crescent)
- Kanabec (largest city: Mora)
- Kandiyohi (largest city: Willmar)
- Le Sueur (largest city: Le Sueur)
- Marshall (largest city: Warren)
- Mille Lacs (largest city: Princeton)
- Pennington (largest city: Thief River Falls)
- Polk (largest city: East Grand Forks)
- Pope (largest city: Glenwood)
- Red Lake (largest city: Red Lake Falls)
- Renville (largest city: Olivia)
- Stevens (largest city: Morris)
- Traverse (largest city: Wheaton)
- Wabasha (largest city: Lake City)
- Waseca (largest city: Waseca)
- Watonwan (largest city: St. James)
- Yellow Medicine (largest city: Granite Falls)
- Clay (largest city: Moorhead)
- Dakota (largest city: Hastings)
- Olmsted (largest city: Rochester)
- Washington (largest city: Stillwater)

==== By congressional district ====
Franken won six of eight congressional districts, including one that elected a Republican.

District	Franken	McFadden	Representative
1st	49%	45%	Tim Walz
2nd	49%	48%	John Kline
3rd	48.5%	48.7%	Erik Paulsen
4th	61%	35%	Betty McCollum
5th	74%	23%	Keith Ellison
6th	42%	54%	Tom Emmer
7th	48%	47%	Collin Peterson
8th	54%	42%	Rick Nolan

== See also ==
- 2014 Minnesota elections
