= Dick Franson =

Member of the Minneapolis City Council from the 12th ward
- In office 1963–1965
- Succeeded by: Arne Carlson

Personal details
- Born: Richard Franson
- Died: May 27, 2015
- Party: Democratic

Richard Franson (died May 27, 2015) was an American politician.

== Political career ==
=== Subsequent elections ===
A 1997 article in The Minnesota Star Tribune said he sent out 350 faxes a month to various news agencies and federal organizations, including the Federal Bureau of Investigation, Central Intelligence Agency, and the Executive Office of the President.

Franson ran for mayor of Minneapolis in 1993, but withdrew and supported John Derus.

Franson was a candidate in the 1997 Minneapolis mayoral election, in what marked his 15th run for office. He promoted himself as a conservative Democrat, mainly targeting veterans, senior citizens, and those who are anti-abortion. Franson had concentrated support in the local chapter of Veterans of Foreign Wars, of which he was a junior vice commander. By September, Although Franson had spent merely $350 on his campaign, a poll revealed that 32% of likely voters recognized his name, and his favorability rating was at 11%.

== Death ==
Franson died on May 27, 2015.
