= 2013 Minnesota House of Representatives district 19A special election =

District 19A special election, 2013
- February 12, 2013

The District 19A seat in the Minnesota House of Representatives
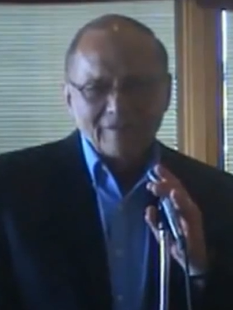
Nominee	Clark Johnson	Allen Quist	Tim Gieseke
Party	Democratic (DFL)	Republican	Independence
Popular vote	2,680	1,801	511
Percentage	53.69%	36.08%	10.24%
- Precinct Results Johnson: 50-60% 60-70% 70-80% 80-90% Quist: 30-40% 40-50% 50-60% Gieseke: 50-60% Tie: 40-50% Johnson/Quist No Vote
Representative before election
Terry Morrow
Democratic (DFL)
Elected Representative
Clark Johnson
Democratic (DFL)

A special election was held in the U.S. state of Minnesota on February 12, 2013, to elect a new representative for District 19A in the Minnesota House of Representatives, caused by the resignation of Representative Terry Morrow on January 7, 2013. A primary election was held on January 29, 2013. The election coincided with the District 14A special election. Clark Johnson, the Minnesota Democratic–Farmer–Labor Party (DFL) nominee, won the special election.

== Background ==
On December 19, 2012, Representative Terry Morrow announced he would resign to join the Uniform Law Commission as its legislative director. He resigned on January 7, 2013, the day before the beginning of the new session of the Minnesota Legislature.

== Candidates ==
=== Minnesota Democratic–Farmer–Labor Party ===
==== Nominee ====
- Clark Johnson (party endorsed), faculty member at Minnesota State University, Mankato

==== Withdrawn ====
- Robin Courrier, teacher; leader of local teachers' union
- Karl Johnson, farmer
- Tim Strand, Mayor of St. Peter

=== Republican Party of Minnesota ===
==== Nominee ====
- Allen Quist (party endorsed), 2012 Republican candidate for the 1st congressional district; two-time candidate for Governor of Minnesota; former member of the Minnesota House of Representatives

==== Withdrawn ====
- Joel Brinker, former St. Peter city council member
- Jim Golgart, Le Sueur County Veterans Services officer

=== Independence Party of Minnesota ===
==== Nominee ====
- Tim Gieseke (party endorsed), small business owner

== Primary election ==
The Minnesota Democratic–Farmer–Labor Party (DFL) did not endorse a candidate until after the deadline for withdrawing (January 16 at 5:00 p.m.), leaving the candidates that did not win the party endorsement unable to withdraw their candidacies, causing a primary election. The losing candidates said they would abide by the endorsement.

Election	Candidate	Votes	%
District 19A special election, 2013: DFL primary	Clark Johnson	641	66.29
District 19A special election, 2013: DFL primary	Karl Johnson	252	26.06
District 19A special election, 2013: DFL primary	Tim Strand	51	5.27
District 19A special election, 2013: DFL primary	Robin Courrier	23	2.38
District 19A special election, 2013: Republican primary	Allen Quist	105	100.00
District 19A special election, 2013: Independence primary	Tim Gieseke	55	100.00

== Results ==
Election	Political result	Candidate	Party	Votes	%
District 19A special election, 2013; Resignation of Terry Morrow; Voters: 4,992 (−71.76%)	DFL hold Plurality: 879 (17.61 pp)	Clark Johnson	DFL	2,680	53.69
District 19A special election, 2013; Resignation of Terry Morrow; Voters: 4,992 (−71.76%)	DFL hold Plurality: 879 (17.61 pp)	Allen Quist	Republican	1,801	36.08
District 19A special election, 2013; Resignation of Terry Morrow; Voters: 4,992 (−71.76%)	DFL hold Plurality: 879 (17.61 pp)	Tim Gieseke	Independence	511	10.24

== Previous election results ==
Election	Political result	Candidate	Party	Votes	%
Minnesota House of Representatives elections, 2012; Redrawn district Voters: 17,679	DFL win	Terry Morrow	DFL	17,263	97.65
Minnesota House of Representatives elections, 2012; Redrawn district Voters: 17,679	DFL win	Write-in	N/A	416	2.35
