= Allen Quist =

American politician

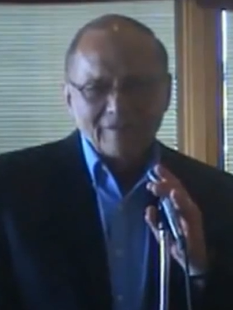

Member of the Minnesota House of Representatives from the 23B district
- In office January 1983 – January 1989
- Preceded by: Carl M. Johnson
- Succeeded by: Don Ostrom

Personal details
- Born: October 14, 1944 (age 82)
- Party: Republican
- Spouse(s): Diane (d. 1986); Julie Quist
- Children: Emily, Lisa, Laurie, Andrew, Nathan, Katie, Marissa, Tricia, Julie, Daniel
- Education: Bethany Lutheran College; Gustavus Adolphus College; Minnesota State University, Mankato
- Occupation: farmer professor

Allen J. Quist (born October 14, 1944) is an American politician, a former member of the Minnesota House of Representatives, and a two-time candidate for governor of the state.

== Political career ==
=== State representative ===
A Republican, Quist was first elected to the Minnesota House of Representatives in November 1982. He served three terms from January 4, 1983 until January 2, 1989. He was defeated for re-election by St. Peter School Board Chair and Gustavus Adolphus College Professor Don Ostrom in November 1988. He represented the old District 23B, which included portions of Blue Earth, Brown, Le Sueur, Nicollet, and Renville counties in the south central part of the state. He chaired the Health and Human Services Subcommittee on Social Services during the 1985-1986 biennium.

In 2013, he ran in a special election to fill a vacancy in House District 19A, winning the January Republican nominating convention but losing the general election to Clark Johnson on February 12, 2013.

In December 1986, Quist's first wife, Diane, died in a car accident, along with the child she was pregnant with. He subsequently married conservative activist Julie Morse in 1987. He has ten children, nine by his first wife and one by his second.

=== 1994 and 1998 gubernatorial runs ===
A stalwart conservative, Quist challenged incumbent Governor Arne Carlson in the 1994 gubernatorial election, with former U.S. Senate candidate Doug McFarland as his running mate. He campaigned on the premise that the pro-choice Carlson was too liberal to lead the Republican Party. Although he won endorsement at his party's convention, he was defeated by Carlson in the state's open primary. He ran for governor again in 1998, but withdrew before the state convention in favor of Saint Paul Mayor Norm Coleman.

=== 2010 congressional race ===
On November 19, 2009, Quist announced his candidacy for U.S. Representative in Minnesota's 1st Congressional District in the 2010 race against incumbent Representative Tim Walz. Quist lost the Republican primary to Minnesota State Representative Randy Demmer.

In early December 2009, Quist claimed that a marriage penalty exists in the U.S. House and Senate health care bills.

Quist garnered controversy for his December 7, 2009, speech at a Christmas Party of the Wabasha County Republicans. The following remarks (included in the speech which lasted a total of seven and a half minutes) were criticized by some members of the media:

"Our country is being destroyed. Every generation has had to fight the fight for freedom… Terrorism? Yes. That's not the big battle... The big battle is in D.C. with the radicals. They aren’t liberals. They are radicals. Obama, Pelosi, Walz: They’re not liberals, they’re radicals. They are destroying our country."

Quist also spoke against the health care bill at the event. "This is the most insidious, evil piece of legislation I have ever seen in my life… Every one of us has to be totally committed to killing this travesty… I have to kill this bill."

=== 2012 congressional race ===
In December 2011, Quist announced he would again run for Minnesota's 1st Congressional District against incumbent Tim Walz in 2012. In the congressional primary, Quist won with 54% of the vote over Minnesota State Senator Mike Parry, who later endorsed Quist and said that the two were uniting together in the effort to defeat Walz. Following his announcement, he was praised by Minnesota 6th District Congresswoman Michele Bachmann.

In October 2012, it was reported that Quist had failed to file the required financial disclosure form with federal authorities by the May 15 filing deadline, apparently because he could not figure out the mailing address. The New Ulm Journal reported that: "... Quist now claims that he printed off the form from online and that this form lacked the address. He said that he now has the address and will have the form turned in within two days. He said he taking [sic] a little while longer so auctioneers get his exact land values because he wants all information he submits to be completely accurate."

In the November 2012 general election, Walz defeated Quist by a margin of 58% to 42%.

== Political positions ==
=== Abortion ===
Quist believes that abortion should be a first degree homicide, and has said that it "is a genuine evil act, except when used to save the mother's life, it must be legally restrained."

Quist is the author of the book The Abortion Revolution and the Sanctity of Life. In the book, Quist talks about his anti-abortion stance and the need to overturn Roe v. Wade, saying that it is "one of the most dreadful Supreme Court rulings in history," and that "a majority of the justices legalized the murder of more people in just a few years than Herod and Hitler killed in a lifetime." He added "[i]f our Nation would return to Christian ethical codes, the abortion revolution would come to an end and many other evils mentioned would be largely restrained as well."

=== LGBT rights/marriage ===
During his time in the Minnesota House of Representatives, Quist campaigned against the advent of same-sex marriage in Minnesota. He led efforts against extending human rights protections to gays and lesbians, supported by former Governor Arne Carlson.

Quist also led the sponsorship of a failed bill to require AIDS testing for all marriage license applicants. Quist has drawn criticism for a past statement he made suggesting that supporting a gay counseling center at Minnesota State University, Mankato would be similar to supporting one for the Ku Klux Klan, and saying that "its presence suggests university approval for the homosexual lifestyle and the practice of sodomy... You wouldn’t have a center for the Ku Klux Klan," and that "both would be breeding grounds for evil—AIDS, in this case."

While in the Minnesota House, Quist racked up a cumulative 30 hours in the 1988 session speaking on the House floor about sex.

== Dinosaur comments ==
Quist is the editor of CurriculumModules.org (CMod), a children's education and learning website that "challenges the worldwide views of established education," and offers lessons that contradict modern science and history. In one of CMod’s lessons, it suggests that dinosaurs lived alongside humans as recently as the 12th century.

His lessons suggest that history books and science books have falsely determined that dinosaurs became extinct 66 million years ago, and that "the only reasonable explanation for the Stegosaurus carved in the stone on the wall of the Cambodian temple (Note: This refers to the Dinosaur of Ta Prohm, a bas-relief first supposed to depict a Stegosaurus in 1997.) is that the artist had either seen a Stegosaurus or had seen other art works of a Stegosaurus. Either way, people and stegosaurs were living at the same time."

== Notes ==
Minnesota House of Representatives
Preceded by Carl M. Johnson	State Representative from District 23B; 1983 – 1989	Succeeded by Don Ostrom
Party political offices
Preceded by Jon Grunseth	Endorsed Gubernatorial Candidate, Minnesota Republican Party State Convention; 1994	Succeeded by Norm Coleman
