= Nancy Larson =

- Born: October 19, 1942 (age 83); Keewatin, Minnesota
- Education: St. Cloud State University
- Political party: Democratic (DFL)
- Spouse: Merle Larson
- Children: 4

Nancy Ann Larson (née Carroll; born October 19, 1942) is a U.S. politician from the state of Minnesota.

== Biography ==
Larson was born in Keewatin, Minnesota in 1942. Following her father's death when she was 15, her family moved to Sacramento County, California. Larson would move back to Minnesota, attending Saint Cloud State University and graduating with a degree in political science. Larson moved to Dassel, Minnesota with her husband and became involved in politics, joining the DFL. She became the executive director of the Minnesota Association of Small Cities in 1988, and served until 2016.

Larson would run for the Minnesota House of Representatives twice, first in 1992 and again in 2012. In 1994, she was John Marty's running mate, nominated for Lieutenant Governor of Minnesota. In 1998, she ran for Minnesota State Auditor. Following the resignation of Rick Stafford as State Chair of the DFL, Larson considered running for the position. From 2004 to 2012 she was a member of the Democratic National Committee. In 2014, Larson received the Hubert H. Humphrey Award for her work within the DFL.

Party political offices
Preceded by Marlene Johnson	DFL nominee for Lieutenant Governor of Minnesota; 1994	Succeeded by Roger Moe
Party political offices
Preceded by Donald Moe	DFL nominee for Minnesota State Auditor; 1998	Succeeded by Carol C. Johnson
