= 1994 Minnesota gubernatorial election =

- November 8, 1994
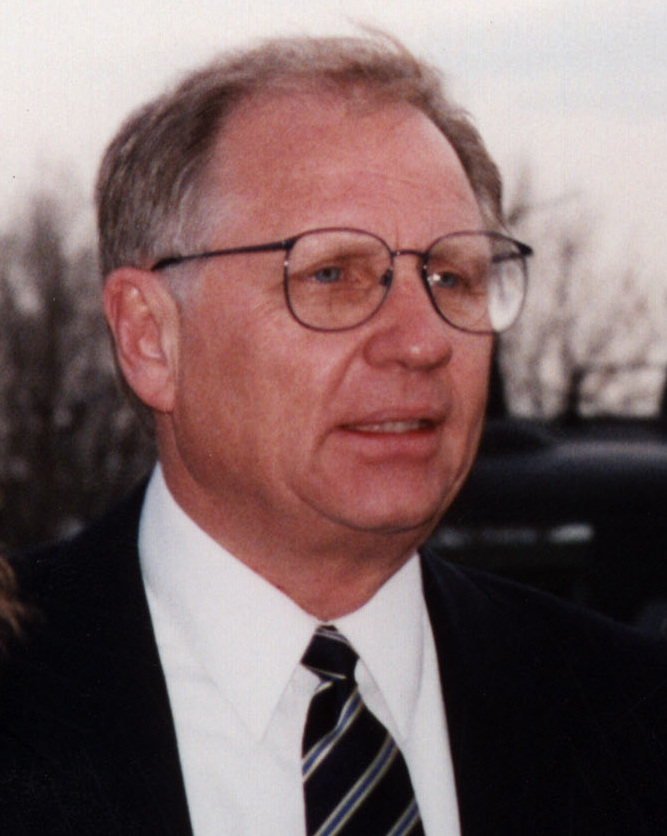

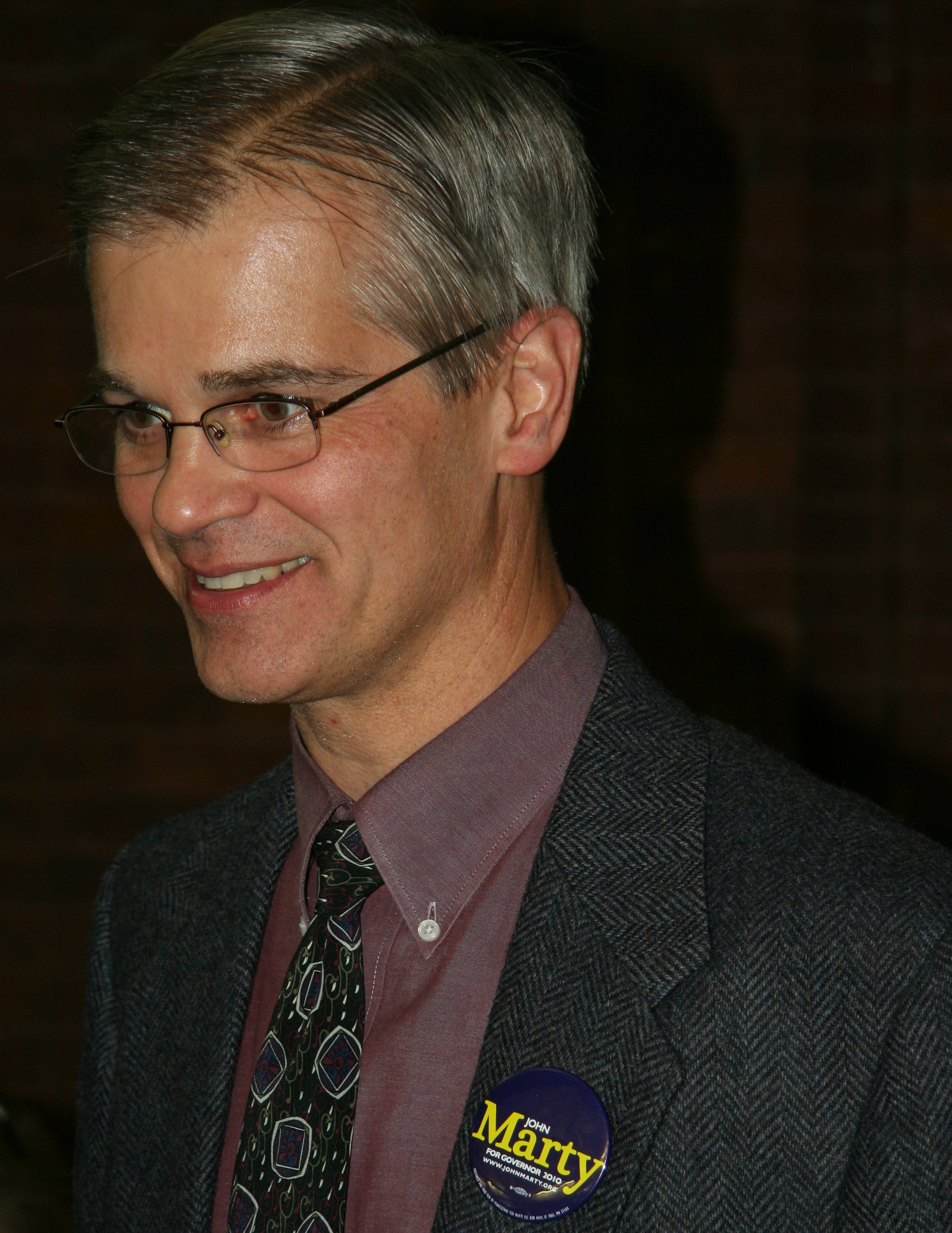
Nominee	Arne Carlson	John Marty
Party	Ind.-Republican	Democratic (DFL)
Running mate	Joanne Benson	Nancy Larson
Popular vote	1,094,165	589,344
Percentage	63.34%	34.12%
- Carlson: 30–40% 40–50% 50–60% 60–70% 70–80% 80–90% >90% Marty: 30–40% 40–50% 50–60% 60–70% 70–80% 80–90% >90% Tie: 40–50% 50% No votes
Governor before election
Arne Carlson
Republican
Elected Governor
Arne Carlson
Republican

The 1994 Minnesota gubernatorial election took place on November 8, 1994, in the midst of that year's Republican Revolution. Incumbent Republican Arne Carlson easily won re-election over Democrat–Farmer–Labor state senator John Marty.

To date, this is the most recent gubernatorial election in which Hennepin and Ramsey counties voted for the Republican candidate.

This was the first time since 1950 that an incumbent Republican governor of Minnesota won re-election. It is also the most recent statewide election in which a Republican won a majority of the vote.

== Republican Party ==
While incumbent Arne Carlson was popular in the state, he was not popular with rank-and-file Republicans, who viewed his victory in 1990 as an accident, as he was chosen as a replacement nominee shortly before the general election. Carlson, who was pro-choice and in favor of extending civil rights to homosexuals, was seen as too moderate by delegates to the GOP state convention, who ultimately chose former state representative Allen Quist, a staunch conservative, as their nominee. Ultimately, though, Carlson easily defeated Quist in the state primary, putting himself on the ballot for November.

=== Candidates ===
- Arne Carlson, incumbent governor since 1991
  - Running mate: Joanne Benson, state senator from St. Cloud
- Allen Quist, St. Peter farmer and former state representative

- Running mate: Doug McFarland, Hamline University law professor

=== Primary results ===
Republican primary results by county Carlson: 50–60%; 60–70%; 70–80%; Quist: 50–60%; 60–70%; 70–80%

1994 Republican gubernatorial primary
Party	Candidate	Votes	%
Republican	Arne Carlson (incumbent)	321,084	66.5
Republican	Allen Quist	161,670	33.5
Total votes		482,754	100.0

== Democratic Party ==
At the DFL convention, Marty received the party endorsement, beating back a strong challenge by three opponents, one of whom Mike Freeman, son of a popular former governor withdrew, but Marty still faced a strong challenge from former Minneapolis Chief of Police Tony Bouza. Bouza faded, however, when it was revealed that he supported severe restrictions on handguns. Marty ultimately won a narrow victory in the primary over former Commerce Commissioner Mike Hatch, who lost his second consecutive gubernatorial primary.

=== Candidates ===
- Tony Bouza, former Minneapolis chief of police and director of the Minnesota Gaming Commission
  - Running mate: Kim Stokes, Britt resident
- Mike Hatch, former commissioner of commerce and candidate for governor in 1990
  - Running mate: Robert Schmitz, farmer and former state senator from Jordan
- John Marty, state senator from Roseville
  - Running mate: Nancy Larson, executive director of the Minnesota Association of Small Cities
- Richard T. Van Bergen, Buffalo resident and LaRouche movement supporter
  - Running mate: Glenn Mesaros, Minneapolis resident and perennial candidate

==== Withdrew ====
- Michael O. Freeman, Hennepin County attorney and son of former Governor Orville Freeman (withdrew after DFL Convention)

=== Primary results ===
Democratic primary results by county Marty: 30–40%; 40–50%; Hatch: 30–40%; 40–50%; 50–60%; 60–70%

1994 Democratic gubernatorial primary
Party	Candidate	Votes	%
Democratic	John Marty	144,462	37.8
Democratic	Mike Hatch	139,109	36.4
Democratic	Tony Bouza	98,341	25.7
Democratic	Richard T. Van Bergen	4,761	1.2
Total votes		382,163	100.0

== General election ==
=== Campaign ===
The 1994 election nationwide was noted for a GOP wave of election victories. In Minnesota, that wave was not as evident, as half of the statewide elections went for each party. The GOP won the governorship, U.S. senator, and state auditor positions, and the DFL won the state attorney general, secretary of state, and state treasurer positions. Additionally, the Minnesota State House remained in DFL control by a 72–64 margin. The results of the gubernatorial general election were Arne Carlson 1,094,165, John Marty 589,344, Will Shetterly 20,785, Jon Hillson 3,022, Eric Arthur Olson 15,467, Leslie Davis 4,611.

=== Candidates ===
- Arne Carlson, incumbent governor since 1991 (Independent-Republican)
  - Running mate: Joanne Benson, state senator
- Leslie Davis, Minneapolis environmental activist and perennial candidate (Nutritional Rights)
  - Running mate: Phil Ratté, perennial candidate
- Jon Hillson, St. Paul railroad switchman (Socialist Workers)
  - Running mate: Leah Finger
- John Marty, state senator from Roseville (Democratic–Farmer–Labor)
  - Running mate: Nancy Larson, executive director of the Minnesota Association of Small Cities
- Eric Olson, Minneapolis insurance agent (Libertarian)
  - Running mate: Michael Strand, Minneapolis resident
- Will Shetterly, Minneapolis fantasy and comic book writer (Grassroots)
  - Running mate: Tim Davis, Minneapolis forklift operator and candidate for state representative in 1990

=== Polling ===
Source	Date	Carlson (R)	Marty (D)
St. Paul Pioneer Press	Oct. 2, 1994	54%	29%

=== Debate ===
1994 Minnesota gubernatorial election debate
No.	Date	Host	Moderator	Link	Republican	Democratic
Key: P Participant A Absent N Not invited I Invited W Withdrawn						
Key: P Participant A Absent N Not invited I Invited W Withdrawn					Arne Carlson	John Marty
1	Nov. 1, 1994	League of Women Voters; WCCO (AM); WCCO-TV		C-SPAN	P	P

=== Results ===
1994 gubernatorial election, Minnesota
Party	Candidate	Votes	%	±%
Ind.-Republican	Arne Carlson (incumbent)	1,094,165	63.34%	+13.24%
Democratic (DFL)	John Marty	589,344	34.12%	−12.65%
Grassroots	Will Shetterly	20,785	1.20%	+0.24%
Libertarian	Eric Olson	15,467	0.90%	n/a
Natural Rights Alliance	Leslie Davis	4,611	0.27%	n/a
Socialist Workers	Jon Hillson	3,022	0.17%	n/a
Majority		504,821	29.22%	
Turnout		1,727,394		
Ind.-Republican hold		Swing		

==== Results by county ====
County	Arne Carlson Republican		John Marty DFL		All Others		Margin		Total votes cast
County	#	%	#	%	#	%	#	%	Total votes cast
Aitkin	3,590	53.5%	2,749	41.0%	371	5.5%	841	12.5%	6,710
Anoka	60,289	64.0%	28,906	30.7%	4,957	5.3%	31,383	33.3%	94,152
Becker	7,038	63.9%	3,446	31.3%	529	4.8%	3,592	32.6%	11,013
Beltrami	6,138	50.6%	5,215	43.0%	768	6.3%	923	7.6%	12,121
Benton	6,176	59.9%	3,589	34.8%	550	5.3%	2,587	25.1%	10,315
Big Stone	1,441	49.3%	1,375	47.1%	105	3.6%	66	2.2%	2,921
Blue Earth	10,688	54.6%	7,383	37.7%	1,507	7.7%	3,305	16.9%	19,578
Brown	6,557	65.1%	2,976	29.5%	541	5.4%	3,581	35.6%	10,074
Carlton	5,394	45.4%	5,892	49.6%	585	4.9%	-498	-4.2%	11,871
Carver	15,262	74.2%	4,309	21.0%	985	4.9%	10,953	53.2%	20,556
Cass	6,152	62.2%	3,342	33.8%	390	3.9%	2,810	28.4%	9,884
Chippewa	3,314	60.1%	1,995	36.2%	208	3.8%	1,319	23.9%	5,517
Chisago	8,689	63.2%	4,351	31.6%	711	5.2%	4,338	31.6%	13,751
Clay	10,722	68.4%	4,437	28.3%	508	3.3%	6,285	40.1%	15,667
Clearwater	1,700	54.5%	1,241	39.8%	176	5.6%	459	14.7%	3,117
Cook	1,334	55.2%	943	39.0%	140	5.9%	391	16.2%	2,417
Cottonwood	2,899	54.7%	1,847	34.9%	549	10.3%	1,052	19.8%	5,295
Crow Wing	12,314	62.3%	6,694	33.9%	758	3.8%	5,620	28.4%	19,766
Dakota	81,475	69.9%	29,969	25.7%	5,103	4.4%	51,506	44.2%	116,547
Dodge	4,203	68.0%	1,693	27.4%	285	4.6%	2,510	40.6%	6,181
Douglas	7,826	64.2%	3,926	32.2%	444	3.6%	3,900	32.0%	12,196
Faribault	4,733	64.2%	2,332	31.7%	302	4.1%	2,401	32.5%	7,367
Fillmore	5,417	69.5%	2,001	25.7%	374	4.8%	3,416	43.8%	7,792
Freeborn	8,473	62.9%	4,592	34.1%	404	3.0%	3,881	28.8%	13,469
Goodhue	11,199	69.1%	4,398	27.1%	621	3.8%	6,801	42.0%	16,218
Grant	1,770	56.4%	1,275	40.6%	96	3.1%	495	15.8%	3,141
Hennepin	272,167	64.6%	131,223	31.1%	18,047	4.3%	140,944	33.5%	421,437
Houston	5,101	64.4%	2,362	29.8%	458	5.8%	2,739	34.8%	7,921
Hubbard	4,396	59.2%	2,627	35.4%	397	5.3%	1,769	23.8%	7,420
Isanti	6,239	59.4%	3,680	35.0%	587	5.5%	2,559	24.4%	10,506
Itasca	9,090	49.4%	8,515	46.3%	805	4.3%	575	3.1%	18,410
Jackson	2,801	55.6%	1,891	37.5%	349	7.0%	910	18.1%	5,041
Kanabec	2,880	60.1%	1,675	35.0%	236	4.9%	1,205	25.1%	4,791
Kandiyohi	8,874	57.6%	5,550	36.0%	993	6.4%	3,324	21.6%	15,417
Kittson	1,445	53.2%	1,174	43.2%	95	3.6%	271	10.0%	2,717
Koochiching	2,756	48.3%	2,672	46.9%	273	4.8%	84	1.4%	5,701
Lac qui Parle	2,165	52.8%	1,826	44.6%	106	2.6%	339	8.2%	4,097
Lake	2,503	45.0%	2,837	51.0%	225	4.1%	-334	-6.0%	5,565
Lake of the Woods	1,016	57.8%	653	37.2%	88	5.0%	363	20.6%	1,757
Le Sueur	5,435	57.8%	3,475	36.9%	500	5.4%	1,960	20.9%	9,410
Lincoln	1,713	54.2%	1,275	40.4%	171	5.4%	19,60	13.8%	9,410
Lyon	5,304	61.0%	2,924	33.6%	466	5.3%	2,380	26.4%	8,694
Mahnomen	1,119	57.1%	711	36.3%	131	6.6%	408	20.8%	1,961
Marshall	2,556	51.5%	1,982	39.9%	429	8.7%	574	11.6%	4,967
Martin	6,084	65.8%	2,698	29.2%	463	5.0%	3,386	46.6%	9,245
McLeod	8,157	69.7%	2,908	24.9%	634	5.4%	5,249	44.8%	11,699
Meeker	5,301	62.5%	2,801	33.0%	380	4.4%	2,500	29.5%	8,482
Mille Lacs	4,668	59.7%	2,744	35.1%	405	5.2%	1,924	24.6%	7,817
Morrison	5,793	53.2%	4,494	41.3%	601	5.6%	1,299	11.9%	10,888
Mower	8,879	54.9%	6,871	42.5%	429	2.7%	2,008	12.4%	16,179
Murray	2,256	51.2%	1,745	39.6%	402	9.2%	511	11.6%	4,403
Nicollet	6,337	56.3%	4,044	35.9%	879	7.8%	2,293	23.4%	11,260
Nobles	4,396	55.3%	2,881	36.2%	671	8.4%	1,515	19.1%	7,948
Norman	2,099	60.0%	1,265	36.1%	136	3.8%	834	23.9%	3,500
Olmsted	29,118	73.9%	8,693	22.1%	1,570	3.9%	20,425	51.8%	39,381
Otter Tail	13,295	65.2%	6,269	30.7%	833	4.1%	7,026	34.5%	20,397
Pennington	2,639	55.5%	1,962	41.3%	153	3.3%	677	14.2%	4,754
Pine	4,795	53.1%	3,758	41.6%	473	5.3%	1,037	11.5%	9,026
Pipestone	2,139	53.6%	1,508	37.8%	344	8.6%	631	15.8%	3,991
Polk	6,667	58.5%	4,308	37.8%	417	3.7%	2,359	20.7%	11,392
Pope	3,034	60.0%	1,855	36.7%	167	3.3%	1,179	23.3%	5,056
Ramsey	108,001	58.6%	68,095	36.9%	8,303	4.5%	39,906	21.7%	184,399
Red Lake	992	50.4%	910	46.2%	68	3.5%	82	4.2%	1,970
Redwood	4,983	69.1%	1,927	26.7%	297	4.1%	3,056	42.4%	7,207
Renville	4,669	62.9%	2,508	33.6%	262	3.4%	2,191	29.3%	7,469
Rice	10,280	56.8%	7,072	39.1%	745	4.1%	3,208	17.7%	18,097
Rock	2,114	55.8%	1,317	34.8%	357	9.5%	797	21.0%	3,788
Roseau	3,532	57.1%	2,217	35.9%	435	7.0%	1,315	21.2%	6,184
Saint Louis	36,710	43.7%	43,589	51.9%	3,631	4.3%	-6,879	-8.2%	83,930
Scott	17,140	69.3%	6,376	25.8%	1,207	4.9%	10,764	12.5%	24,723
Sherburne	11,172	65.3%	5,002	29.3%	924	5.4%	6,170	36.0%	17,098
Sibley	3,653	65.6%	1,614	29.0%	302	5.4%	2,039	37.6%	5,569
Stearns	27,125	61.6%	14,542	33.0%	2,362	5.4%	12,583	28.6%	44,029
Steele	9,257	68.5%	3,743	27.7%	511	3.8%	5,514	40.8%	13,511
Stevens	2,352	56.9%	1,552	37.5%	233	5.6%	800	19.4%	4,137
Swift	2,151	47.8%	2,130	47.4%	216	4.8%	21	0.4%	4,497
Todd	5,258	56.1%	3,537	37.8%	574	6.0%	1,721	16.3%	9,369
Traverse	983	54.2%	731	40.3%	98	5.4%	252	13.9%	1,812
Wabasha	5,271	65.8%	2,453	30.6%	281	3.5%	2,818	35.2%	8,005
Wadena	3,028	58.9%	1,822	35.4%	295	5.8%	1,206	23.5%	5,145
Waseca	4,550	64.0%	2,261	31.8%	296	4.2%	2,289	32.2%	7,107
Washington	47,805	68.6%	18,979	27.2%	2,901	4.2%	28,826	41.4%	69,685
Watonwan	2,592	56.8%	1,666	36.5%	304	6.7%	926	20.3%	4,562
Wilkin	1,877	70.0%	710	26.5%	96	3.6%	1,167	43.5%	2,683
Winona	10,329	60.4%	5,962	34.9%	809	4.8%	4,367	25.5%	17,100
Wright	17,580	65.6%	7,954	29.7%	1,267	4.7%	9,626	35.9%	26,801
Yellow Medicine	2,721	55.8%	1,943	39.8%	212	4.3%	778	16.0%	4,876
Totals	1,094,165	62.0%	589,344	33.4%	82,269	4.7%	504,821	28.6%	1,765,778

Counties that flipped from Democratic to Republican

- Anoka
- Aitkin
- Becker
- Beltrami
- Big Stone
- Benton
- Cook
- Clay
- Clearwater
- Grant
- Isanti
- Houston
- Itasca
- Jackson
- Kanabec
- Kittson
- Koochiching
- Kandiyohi
- Lac qui Parle
- Lake of the Woods
- Le Sueur
- Marshall
- Mahnomen
- Mille Lacs
- Morrison
- Mower
- Murray
- Norman
- Pennington
- Nobles
- Polk
- Pine
- Pipestone
- Pope
- Red Lake
- Roseau
- Sherburne
- Stearns
- Stevens
- Swift
- Todd
- Traverse
- Wright
- Wilkin
