= Carlos Mariani =

American politician (born 1957)

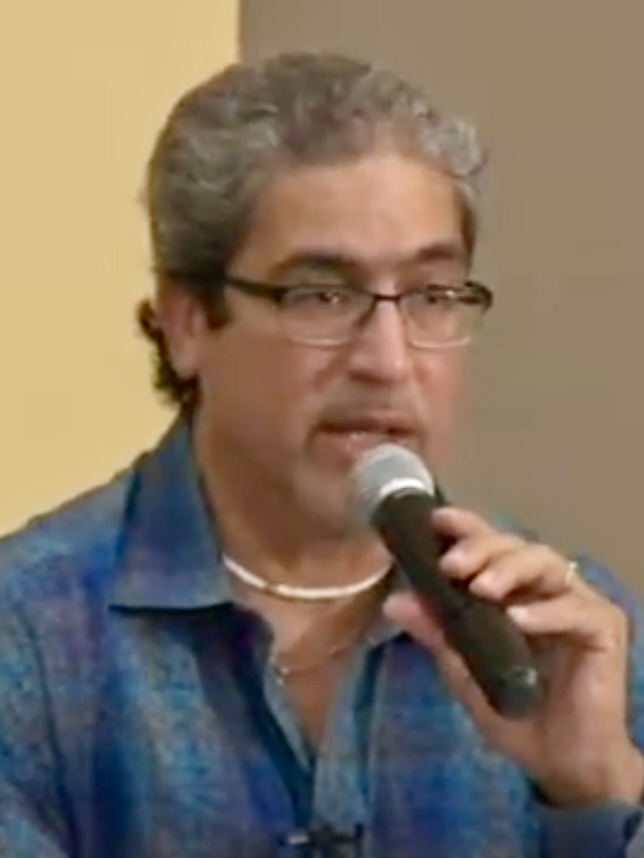
- Mariani in 2018

Member of the Minnesota House of Representatives from the 65B district
- In office January 8, 1991 – January 3, 2023
- Preceded by: Sandy Pappas
- Succeeded by: María Isa Pérez-Vega

Personal details
- Born: July 13, 1957 (age 69)
- Party: Minnesota Democratic–Farmer–Labor Party
- Spouse: Maritza
- Children: 3
- Education: Macalester College; University of Minnesota
- Occupation: non-profit management, legislator

Carlos Mariani (born July 13, 1957) is a Minnesota politician and former member of the Minnesota House of Representatives. A member of the Minnesota Democratic–Farmer–Labor Party (DFL), he represented District 65B, which includes portions of the city of Saint Paul in Ramsey County, a part of the Twin Cities metropolitan area.

== Education ==
Mariani graduated from Macalester College in Saint Paul with a B.A., and later attended the Humphrey Institute at the University of Minnesota, where he was a Mondale Policy Fellow, and the University of Minnesota Law School.

== Minnesota House of Representatives ==
Mariani was first elected to the House in 1990 and was reelected every two years for three decades. He announced his retirement in 2022 amid state legislative redistricting. Mariani chaired the K-12 Education Policy and Oversight Committee from 2007 to 2010 and was an assistant majority leader during the 1995–96 biennium.

In 2022, shortly before his retirement, Mariani received the Joan Growe Award at the Humphrey-Mondale Awards.

== Personal life ==
Mariani works in nonprofit management as the executive director of the Minnesota Education Equity Partnership.
