= Barbara Carlson =

American politician and radio host

Minneapolis City Council, 7th Ward
- In office 1982–1990

Personal details
- Born: Barbara Duffy; June 21, 1938 Mitchell, South Dakota, U.S.
- Died: July 9, 2018 (aged 80)
- Party: Republican (until 1986); Independent (after 1986)
- Spouses: Arne Carlson (m. 1965; div. 1977) Pete Anderson (m. 1983)
- Children: 2

Barbara Carlson (June 21, 1938 – July 9, 2018) was an American politician and radio host from Minneapolis, Minnesota.

== Biography ==
Her father, Harry Duffy, made a successful business of running the local lumber yard in Anoka, Minnesota. She was married to Minnesota Representative Arne Carlson from 1965 until they divorced in 1977. Arne Carlson was later elected Governor of Minnesota in 1991. They are the parents of two children: Tucker and Anne. Carlson married Martin "Pete" Anderson in 1983.

Carlson, a self-described conservative, served on the Minneapolis City Council as an Independent-Republican, and later as an independent. She ran a campaign as a candidate for mayor of Minneapolis against Sharon Sayles Belton in 1997.

Carlson was a radio talk show host on KSTP. She wrote two books, including her 1996 autobiography, This Broad's Life. She died of lung cancer on July 9, 2018, aged 80.
