= 1998 Minnesota State Auditor election =

- November 3, 1998

Nominee	Judi Dutcher	Nancy A. Larson	Patricia G.V. Becker
Party	Republican	Democratic (DFL)	Constitution
Popular vote	968,132	812,892	116,578
Percentage	49.06%	41.20%	5.91%
- County results Dutcher: 40-50% 50-60% 60-70% Larson: 40-50% 50-60% 60-70%
State Auditor before election
Judi Dutcher
Ind.-Republican
Elected State Auditor
Judi Dutcher
Republican

The 1998 Minnesota State Auditor election was held on November 3, 1998, in order to elect the state auditor of Minnesota. Republican nominee and incumbent state auditor Judi Dutcher defeated Democratic–Farmer–Labor nominee Nancy A. Larson, Constitution nominee Patricia G.V. Becker, Libertarian nominee Bob Odden and Progressive Minnesota nominee Joseph G. Peschek.

While this is the most recent election where a Republican incumbent won re-election as of 2025, Dutcher would switch her party affiliation to the DFL in January 2000.

== General election ==
On election day, November 3, 1998, Republican nominee Judi Dutcher won re-election by a margin of 155,240 votes against her foremost opponent Democratic–Farmer–Labor nominee Nancy A. Larson, thereby retaining Republican control over the office of state auditor. Dutcher was sworn in for her second term on January 3, 1999.

=== Results ===
Minnesota State Auditor election, 1998
Party	Candidate	Votes	%
Republican	Judi Dutcher (incumbent)	968,132	49.06
Democratic (DFL)	Nancy A. Larson	812,892	41.20
Constitution	Patricia G.V. Becker	116,578	5.91
Libertarian	Bob Odden	40,228	2.04
Progressive	Joseph G. Peschek	33,507	1.70
Write-in		1,940	0.09
Total votes		1,973,277	100.00
Republican hold			
