= Patricia Torres Ray =

American politician

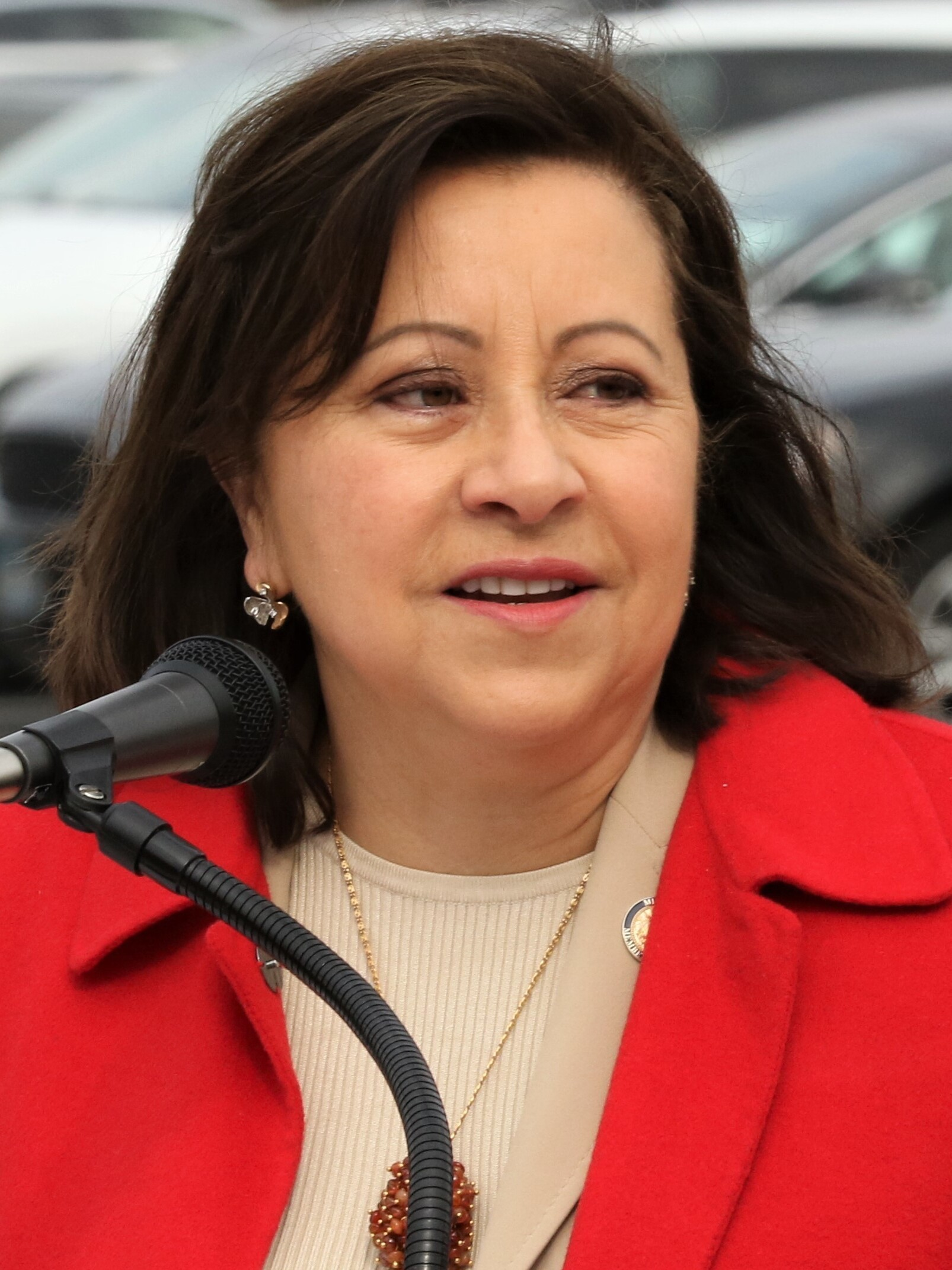

Member of the Minnesota Senate from the 63rd district 62nd (2007–2013)
- In office January 3, 2007 – January 3, 2023
- Preceded by: Wes Skoglund

Personal details
- Born: March 25, 1964 (age 62) Pasto, Colombia
- Party: Democratic–Farmer–Labor
- Spouse: Jackson Ray (m. 1987)
- Children: 2
- Education: University of Minnesota
- Occupation: Consultant, legislator

Patricia Torres Ray (born March 25, 1964) is a Colombian-American politician and former member of the Minnesota Senate. A member of the Minnesota Democratic–Farmer–Labor Party (DFL), she represented District 63, which includes portions of southeastern Minneapolis and eastern Richfield in Hennepin County in the Twin Cities metropolitan area. She is the first Latina woman to serve in the Minnesota Senate. She ran for Congress in Minnesota's 5th district in 2018 to succeed Congressman Keith Ellison, but lost the primary to Ilhan Omar. In November 2021, she announced that she would not run for reelection in 2022.

== Education ==
Torres Ray studied at the University of Minnesota, earning a B.A. in urban studies and a MPA from the Humphrey Institute in 2004.

== Minnesota Senate ==
Torres Ray was first elected in 2006, succeeding retiring Wes Skoglund. She was reelected in 2010, 2012, 2016, and 2020. Torres Ray's legislative concerns included education, health and human services, the environment, and economic development.

== 2010 lieutenant gubernatorial campaign ==
On March 31, 2010, state senator and 2010 Minnesota gubernatorial candidate John Marty announced that Torres Ray would be his running mate for lieutenant governor. The team withdrew from the race at the 2010 DFL State Convention.

== 2018 Congressional campaign ==
On June 5, 2018, Torres Ray filed to run for the 5th district congressional seat previously held by Keith Ellison. Her platform focused on public education, immigration, and climate change. The primary election was held on August 14, with State Representative Ilhan Omar receiving a plurality of votes to advance to the general election.

== Electoral history ==
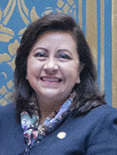
Torres Ray in 2019

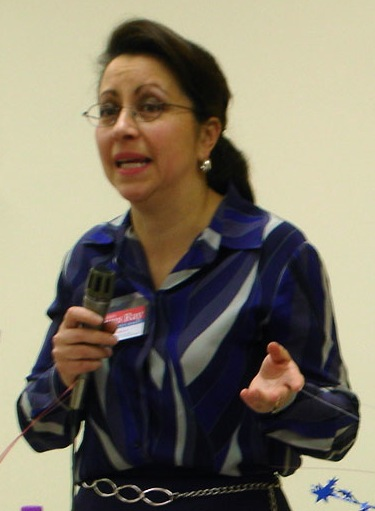
Torres Ray at a district forum in 2006

- Minnesota Senate 63rd district election, 2020
  - Patricia Torres Ray (DFL), 40,742 (77.64%)
  - Diane Napper (R), 8,231 (15.69%)
  - Chris Wright (Grassroots-Legalize Cannabis) 3,460 (6.59%)
- Minnesota Senate 63rd district election, 2016
  - Patricia Torres Ray (DFL), 38,470 (80.70%)
  - Ron Moey (R), 9068, (19.02%)
  - Write-in, 135 (0.28%)
- Minnesota Senate 63rd district election, 2012
  - Patricia Torres Ray (DFL), 36,866 (80.81%)
  - Patrick Marron (R), 8,636 (18.93%)
  - Write-in, 117 (0.26%)
- Minnesota Senate 62nd district election, 2010
  - Patricia Torres Ray (DFL), 26,671 (79.64%)
  - Patrick Elgin (R), 6,751 (20.16%)
  - Write-in, 68 (0.20%)
- Minnesota Senate 62nd district election, 2006
  - Patricia Torres Ray (DFL), 28,787 (81.25%)
  - Dan Mathias (R), 6,569 (18.54%)
  - Write-in, 76 (0.21%)

== Personal life ==
Torres Ray met her husband, Jack, when he was a University of Minnesota student in Colombia for a study abroad internship. They married in 1987. She then immigrated to Minnesota with him, learned English, and became a U.S. citizen.

She and Jack have two sons.
