= Polymet Mining Corporation =

The PolyMet Mining Corporation (formerly Fleck Resources Ltd) (NYSE: PLM, TSX: POM), was an American company focused on mineral exploration and mine development. The company was based in Minnesota, United States with corporate headquarters in Toronto, Canada. It controlled rights to the NorthMet Deposit in the Mesabi Range.

In 2011, PolyMet secured a four million dollar loan from the Iron Range Resources and Rehabilitation Board.

In November 2023, the company was acquired by Glencore.

== See also ==
- PolyMet mine
