= Jon Grunseth =

American businessman and politician (born 1945)

- Born: November 11, 1945 (age 81)
- Occupation: Businessman
- Political party: Independent-Republican
- Spouse(s): Katharine Winston (div. 1983); Vicki Tigwell (m.1984; div. 1998)
- Children: 5

Jon Rieder Grunseth (born November 11, 1945) is an American businessman and former politician from the state of Minnesota. He was the 1990 Independent-Republican nominee for Governor of Minnesota. Grunseth won his party's endorsement and its primary election, but was forced to quit the race nine days before election day in the wake of a scandal. Until the 1990 governor's race, Grunseth had been the Vice President of Public Affairs at Ecolab, and chair of the Chemical Specialties Manufacturers Association. After the scandal, he lost his job at Ecolab, and later moved to Australia, where he ran a cherry-growing operation.

== 1974 congressional candidacy ==
In 1974, Grunseth was the endorsed candidate of the Republican Party for the U.S. House of Representatives for Minnesota's 6th congressional district. He lost by a margin of 55% to 45% to DFL candidate Rick Nolan, who had lost to the Republican incumbent in 1972. (Nolan was re-elected twice and in 2012 was elected to the House from Minnesota's 8th congressional district.)

== 1990 gubernatorial candidacy ==
Grunseth earned the Independent-Republican Party's gubernatorial nomination endorsement at its state convention, defeating moderate State Auditor Arne Carlson. He defeated Carlson again in the September 11, 1990 primary to become the main opposition to incumbent Governor Rudy Perpich.

=== Sex scandal ===
On October 14, 1990, public allegations of sexual misconduct were made against Grunseth. On July 4, 1981, Grunseth held a pool party at his home. It was alleged that his daughter entered the pool naked, and Grunseth joined her, also naked. When two of his daughter's friends, Elizabeth Mulay, 12, and Liane Nelson, 13, refused to swim naked, Grunseth attempted to tear off their swimsuits.

Nine years later, Mulay and Nelson, now adults, levied accusations against Grunseth, which two other women, Lisa Hare and Heather Charles, corroborated. Grunseth denied the allegations, but they severely damaged his candidacy. Nine party attendees submitted affidavits stating that they had witnessed nude swimming. Two members of the rock band that had performed at the party that evening remembered seeing men and teen aged girls swimming naked.

Carlson soon decided to reenter the gubernatorial race as a write-in candidate.

The situation divided the Minnesota Independent-Republican Party. Some defended Grunseth and charged that the accusations were politically motivated, while others wanted Grunseth replaced with 1986 gubernatorial candidate Cal Ludeman.

U.S. Republican Senator Rudy Boschwitz, who was waging his own campaign for reelection, led a moderate faction that wanted Grunseth replaced by Carlson. Boschwitz's stance alienated some of his supporters and was cited as a factor in his defeat.

In reply, Grunseth claimed that he had engaged in adultery and other bad behavior in the past, but that he had changed since then and been faithful to his wife, the former Vicki Tigwell, since their 1984 marriage. A former mistress of Grunseth's, Tamara Jacobsen Taylor, 32, then came forward claiming that she had engaged in sexual relations with Grunseth during his professional visits to the nation's capital (as a lobbyist for Ecolab) as recently as July 1989. Facing certain defeat, Grunseth withdrew from the race on October 28. Carlson, the runner-up in the primary, replaced him on the ballot and defeated Rudy Perpich.

== Post-political career ==
After the election, Grunseth was fired by Ecolab. In 1993, he sued the Marriott hotel chain for $4 million, claiming that they divulged records to the Star Tribune, from the night he stayed at the hotel in July 1989, the night his mistress Taylor alleged was the last she had spent with Grunseth. The amount of the lawsuit was based on what Grunseth would have earned had he not been fired from Ecolab. The court ruled against him, saying the receipt did not contain "private facts", simply showing that he booked a room in the hotel rather than demonstrating whether he was having an affair.

Grunseth later moved to Barnes Bay, Bruny Island, Tasmania, Australia, where he purchased property in 1997 and founded Lennonville Orchards, a large cherry-growing operation. He later lived in France, and as of 2022, he lives in the Hebrides, in Scotland.

Party political offices
Preceded by Cal Ludeman	Republican nominee for Governor of Minnesota; September–October 1990	Succeeded by Arne Carlson
Preceded by Cal Ludeman	Endorsed Gubernatorial Candidate, Minnesota Republican Party State Convention; 1990	Succeeded by Allen Quist
