= Mary Murphy (Minnesota politician) =

American politician (1939–2024)

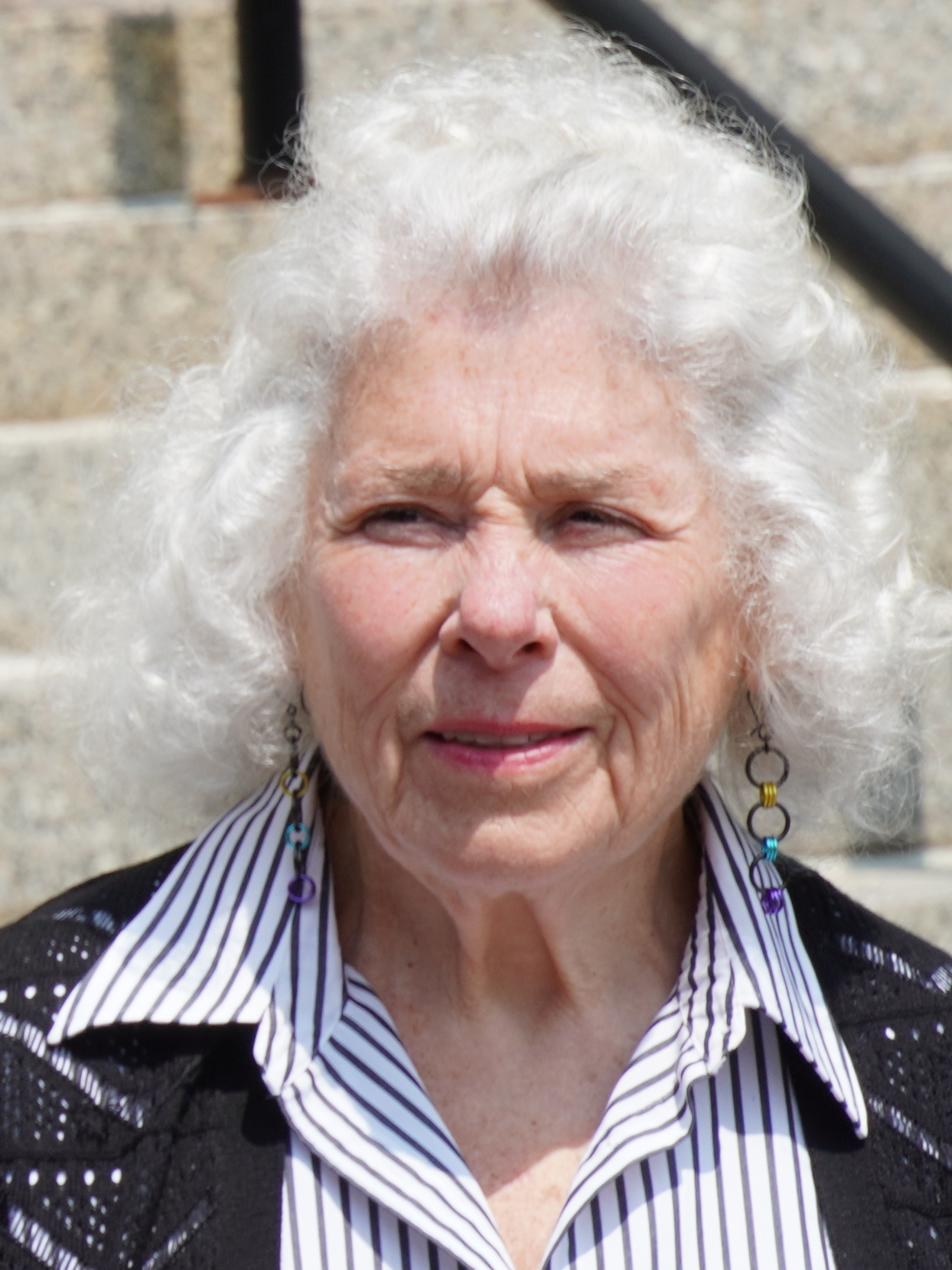
- Murphy in 2019

Member of the Minnesota House of Representatives
- In office January 4, 1977 – January 2, 2023
- Preceded by: Marvin Ketola
- Succeeded by: Natalie Zeleznikar
- Constituency: 14B district (1977–1983); 8A district (1983–2003); 6B district (2003–2013); 3B district (2013–2023)

Personal details
- Born: October 25, 1939 Duluth, Minnesota, U.S.
- Died: December 25, 2024 (aged 85) Duluth, Minnesota, U.S
- Party: Minnesota Democratic–Farmer–Labor Party
- Education: College of St. Scholastica; Indiana University; Macalester College; American University; University of Wisconsin–Superior; University of Minnesota–Duluth
- Profession: Teacher, grounds manager, legislator

Mary Catherine Murphy (October 25, 1939 – December 25, 2024) was an American politician who served in the Minnesota House of Representatives. From 1964 to 1997 she was a history and social studies teacher at Duluth Central High School in Duluth. Murphy was active in historical preservation and worked as a grounds manager.

== Career ==
Murphy was first elected in 1976, and was reelected every two years until 2020. Before the 1982 legislative redistricting, she represented District 14B, and before the 2002 redistricting, she represented District 8A. She was chair of the Ethics Committee during the 2007–08 and 2009–10 biennia.

Murphy chaired the House Labor-Management Relations Subcommittee for Negotiation, General Labor and Legislation from 1979 to 1982, the Commerce and Economic Development Subcommittee for Commerce and Job Creation during the 1983–84 biennium, the Labor-Management Relations Subcommittee for the Unemployment Insurance and Workers Compensation Division during the 1987–88 biennium, the Economic Development Subcommittee for the Rural Resource Development Division during the 1989–90 biennium, the Energy Committee during the 1991–92 biennium, the Judiciary Subcommittee for the Judiciary Finance Division from 1993 to 1998, and the Finance Subcommittee for the Education Finance and Economic Competitiveness Finance Division during the 2007–08 biennium. She was an assistant minority leader during the 2001–02 biennium.

Murphy graduated from Hermantown High School in Hermantown, then in 1961 the College of St. Scholastica in Duluth, with a B.A. in history. She later attended graduate school at Indiana University, Macalester College, American University, the University of Wisconsin in Superior, and the University of Minnesota in Duluth. She is a former member of the Minnesota delegation to the Great Lakes Commission and served on the Minnesota Statehood Sesquicentennial Commission from 2006 to 2008.

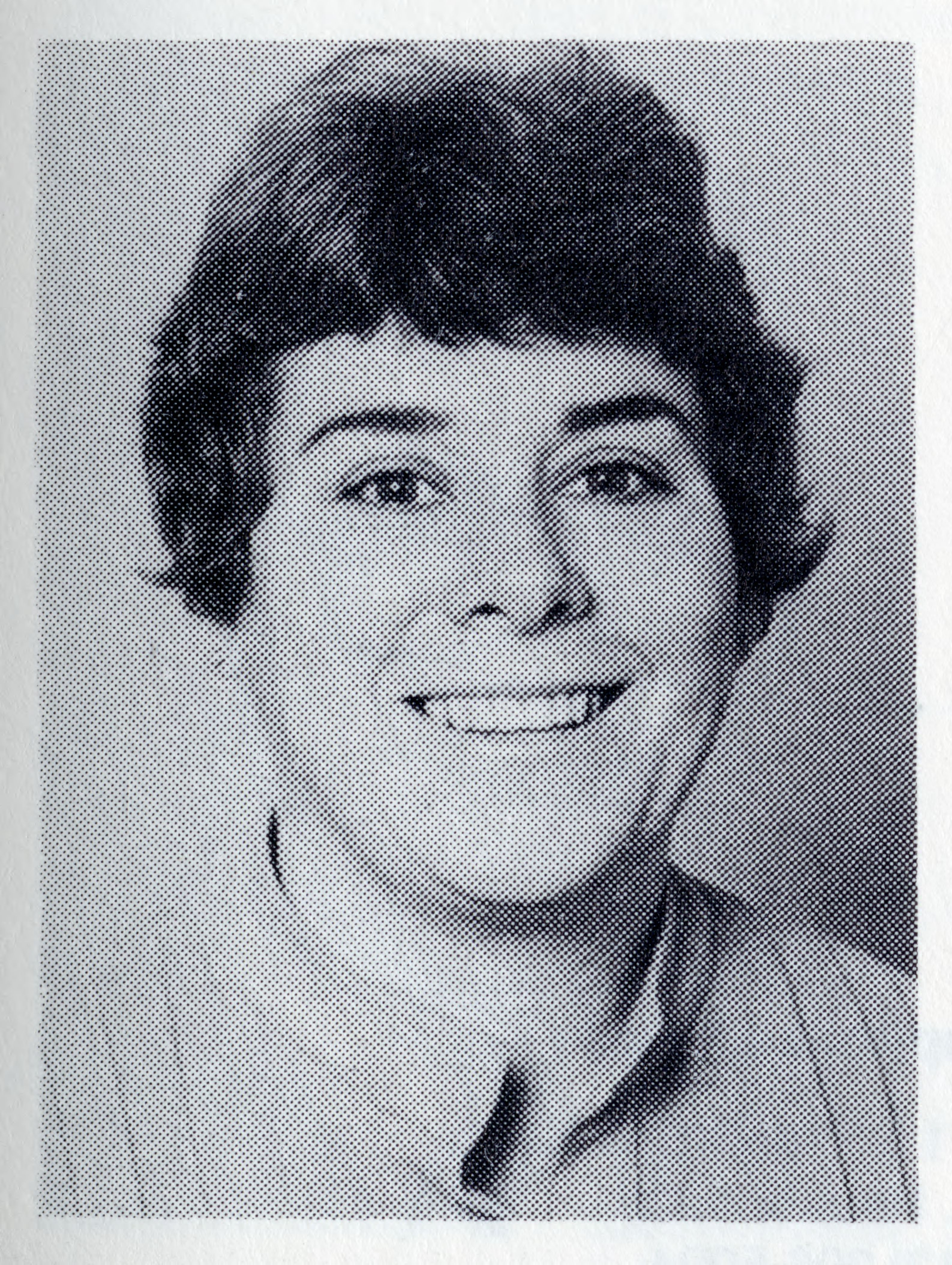
Representative Mary C. Murphy, 1981-1982 Legislative Session, Minnesota Legislature

Murphy's key legislative concerns included labor and union advocacy, women’s economic issues, education, consumer protection, health care, criminal justice, jobs, and capitol projects.

Murphy was defeated for reelection in 2022.

== Death and Legacy ==
Murphy died from complications of a stroke on December 25, 2024, at the age of 85.

Shortly before her death in 2023, she was honored at the Humphrey-Mondale Awards, where she received the Orville L. Freeman Award for Distinguished Service to Greater Minnesota and Agricultural Issues.
