= 1990 Minnesota gubernatorial election =

- November 6, 1990
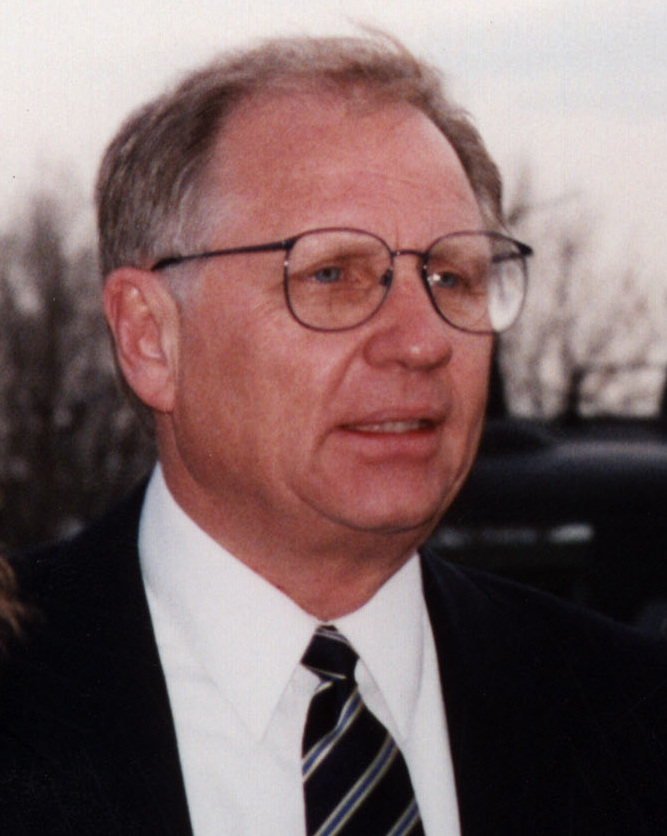

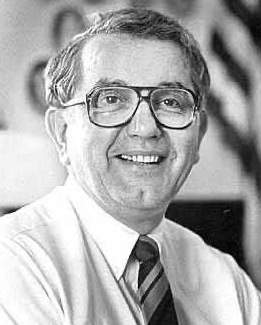
Nominee	Arne Carlson (replacing Jon Grunseth)	Rudy Perpich
Party	Ind.-Republican	Democratic (DFL)
Running mate	Joanell Dyrstad (replacing Sharon Clark)	Marlene Johnson
Popular vote	895,988	836,218
Percentage	50.11%	46.76%
- Carlson: 40–50% 50–60% 60–70% 70–80% 80–90% >90% Perpich: 40–50% 50–60% 60–70% 70–80% 80–90% >90%
Governor before election
Rudy Perpich
Democratic (DFL)
Elected Governor
Arne Carlson
Ind.-Republican

The 1990 Minnesota gubernatorial election took place on November 6, 1990. Independent-Republican Party Auditor Arne Carlson defeated incumbent Minnesota Democratic–Farmer–Labor Party Governor Rudy Perpich. This was the most recent gubernatorial election in Minnesota in which an incumbent governor ran for reelection to a third consecutive term until Tim Walz announced his candidacy for a third term in 2026, though he later withdrew.

Primary elections were held on September 11. Perpich defeated a challenge from Mike Hatch for the DFL nomination. The Independent-Republicans initially nominated businessman Jon Grunseth over Carlson, but Grunseth withdrew in late October following a series of allegations of sexual misconduct against children and extramarital affairs. Carlson, who had launched a write-in campaign against both Perpich and Grunseth, was named the replacement nominee by default as the runner-up in the primary.

Carlson won the election by winning the heavily populated Ramsey and Hennepin counties. However, the race was kept close by Perpich's domination of the counties in Northern Minnesota, allowing for a margin of defeat of only 3.35%. As of 2026, this is the last time that an incumbent governor of Minnesota lost re-election. This election was the first Minnesota gubernatorial election since 1962 that the winner of the gubernatorial election was of the same party as the incumbent president.

== DFL primary ==
=== Candidates ===
- Mike Hatch, former commissioner of Securities and Real Estate (1983–89) and DFL chairman
  - Running mate: Emily Anne Staples, former state senator from Plymouth
- Kent S. Herschbach, Mendota Heights truck driver, Lyndon LaRouche supporter and perennial candidate
  - Running mate: Andrew Olson, farmer and Lyndon LaRouche supporter
- Rudy Perpich, incumbent governor since 1983
  - Running mate: Marlene Johnson, incumbent lieutenant governor since 1983

=== Results ===
1990 DFL gubernatorial primary
Party	Candidate	Votes	%
Democratic (DFL)	Rudy Perpich (incumbent)	218,410	55.49%
Democratic (DFL)	Mike Hatch	166,183	42.22%
Democratic (DFL)	Kent S. Herschbach	8,978	2.28%
Total votes		393,571	100.00%

== Independent-Republican primary ==
=== Candidates ===
- Arne Carlson, Minnesota state auditor
  - Running mate: Joanell Dyrstad, mayor of Red Wing
- Samuel A. Faulk, editor of Chance Magazine and perennial candidate
  - Running mate: James E. Eddleston Sr., Shoreview resident
- Jon Grunseth, businessman
  - Running mate: Sharon Clark, Madison farmer
- Doug A. Kelley, former federal prosecutor and chief of staff to U.S. Senator David Durenberger
  - Running mate: Jean L. Harris, Eden Prairie councilwoman
- Beatrice Mooney, Lake St. Croix Beach registered nurse and perennial candidate
  - Running mate: August Berkshire
- Mary Jane Rachner, retired schoolteacher and perennial candidate
  - Running mate: Cathy Ouyang, director of the Asian American Art Center and Chinese Language Village at Concordia College

=== Withdrew ===
- David Printy

=== Declined ===
- Bill Frenzel, U.S. representative from Golden Valley

=== Results ===
1990 Independent-Republican gubernatorial primary
Party	Candidate	Votes	%
Ind.-Republican	Jon Grunseth	169,451	49.42%
Ind.-Republican	Arne Carlson	108,446	31.63%
Ind.-Republican	Doug A. Kelley	57,872	16.88%
Ind.-Republican	Mary Jane Rachner	2,944	0.86%
Ind.-Republican	Samuel A. Faulk	2,557	0.75%
Ind.-Republican	Beatrice Mooney	1,609	0.47%
Total votes		342,879	100.00%

== General election ==
=== Candidates ===
- Arne Carlson, auditor of Minnesota (Republican) (entered as write-in candidate October 22)
  - Running mate: Joanell Dyrstad, mayor of Red Wing since 1983
- Heart Warrior Chosa, member of the Ojibwe tribe (EarthRIGHT)
  - Running mate: Steven Hesch-Bruggemann, St. Cloud resident
- Ross S. Culverhouse, White Bear Lake computer programmer (Grassroots)
  - Running mate: Oliver Steinberg, White Bear Lake resident
- Wendy Lyons, South St. Paul resident and nominee for U.S. Senate in 1988 (Socialist Workers)
  - Running mate: Craig Honts, South St. Paul resident
- Rudy Perpich, incumbent governor since 1983 (Note: Perpich had previously served as governor from 1976 to 1979.) (Democratic)
  - Running mate: Marlene Johnson, incumbent lieutenant governor since 1983

==== Withdrew ====
- Jon Grunseth, businessman (Republican) (withdrew October 28)
  - Running mate: Sharon Clark, Madison farmer

=== Campaign ===
On October 14, with just over three weeks before the election, two women made public allegations of sexual misconduct against Grunseth. The women alleged that, in 1981, when they were 12 and 13 years old and friends of Grunseth's stepdaughter, Grunseth had requested they swim nude during an Independence Day party at his home and, when they refused, he attempted to forcibly remove their swimsuits. Two other women corroborated their allegations, and nine other attendees submitted sworn affidavits stating that they had witnessed nude swimming at the party. Grunseth and his stepdaughter denied the allegations.

In response to the allegations, Arne Carlson re-entered the race as a write-in candidate on October 22, backed by U.S. Senator Rudy Boschwitz, who was running for re-election and had suffered in the polls since the Grunseth scandal began. On October 26, Perpich, Grunseth, and Carlson participated in a three-way debate on Twin Cities Public Television. Polls at the time suggested that Perpich would easily win the three-way race but lose to Carlson if Grunseth dropped out.

On October 28, the Minneapolis Star-Tribune published new allegations, with Tamara Jacobsen Taylor claiming that she had engaged in sexual relations with Grunseth when he visited Washington as a lobbyist for Ecolab, as late as 1989; though Grunseth admitted to the affair, he claimed it had ended in the early 1980s. Grunseth dropped out of the race the same day, just over a week before election day, facing certain defeat and claiming the pressure was "more than [he] could bear". However, Grunseth's withdrawal came after absentee ballots had been prepared, so he and Clark still went onto receive a number of votes.

The Independent-Republicans held a special meeting on October 30, with some supporting 1986 nominee Cal Ludeman as a replacement over Carlson. However, the Independent-Republicans determined that they lacked the explicit power to choose a new candidate, and Carlson was automatically awarded the nomination by virtue of finishing second in the primary. He selected Joanell Dyrstad as his running mate. Sharon Clark, who had been Grunseth's running mate, filed a lawsuit challenging her removal from the ticket. On November 1, 1990, the Minnesota Supreme Court ruled 5 to 2 against her, affirming Carlson and Dyrstad as the Republican candidates.

=== Results ===
1990 Minnesota gubernatorial election
Party	Candidate	Votes	%	±%
Ind.-Republican	Arne Carlson	895,988	50.11%	+7.02%
Democratic (DFL)	Rudy Perpich (incumbent)	836,218	46.76%	−9.35%
EarthRIGHT	Heart Warrior Chosa	21,139	1.18%	n/a
Grassroots	Ross S. Culverhouse	17,176	0.96%	n/a
Ind.-Republican	Jon Grunseth (Note: Absentee ballots cast for Grunseth before he withdrew from the race.)	10,941	0.61%	n/a
Socialist Workers	Wendy Lyons	6,701	0.37%	n/a
Total votes		1,788,163	100.00%	n/a
Ind.-Republican gain from Democratic (DFL)				
