= PolyMet Mine =

Proposed mining and processing operation

Coordinates: 47°37′49″N 91°54′22″W

The PolyMet Mine, now NewRange Copper Nickel is a proposed copper mining and processing operation in the NorthMet Deposit in northeastern Minnesota, United States, six miles (10 km) south of Babbitt, Minnesota. The project, proposed in 2005 by the now-defunct Polymet Mining Corporation, a subsidiary of Glencore, is controversial with potential environment effects being a major concern.

== History ==
The mine was first proposed by Polymet in 2005. Although the corporation initially hoped to have the mine operating "in a three to five year period" from its announcement in 2004, legal challenges have prevented the opening of the mine, with no construction having occurred as of 2024. Polymet came close to beginning work at the mine in 2019 after receiving the necessary permits from the state and federal governments, but one of the permits was revoked and two others put in jeopardy following legal action by the Fond du Lac Band of Lake Superior Chippewa, a resolute opponent of the project. Polymet and Teck began a joint venture in 2023, resulting in the renaming of the project to Newrange. In 2024, Newrange began converting one of the former Taconite refining buildings at the mine site for future copper processing use.

== Proposed operation and impact ==
The proposed site of the mine, a 4.7 square mile site in Superior National Forest, is part of the Duluth Complex, which contains 275 million tons of proven and probable reserves, with the ore being composed of around 0.79 percent copper. The mine's proposed site, formerly used for iron ore mining by LTV, includes several buildings originally dedicated to Taconite processing, which are in the process of being retrofitted for copper mining use as of 2024. The proposal encompasses the opening of three open pit copper mines, with the deepest being about 700 feet (210 m). Waste rock resulting from the operation of the mine would be stored in large piles next to the pits. The mine would use the hydrometallurgical process of flotation and autoclave leaching to access the copper ore. NewRange also expects to process small amounts of precious metals including platinum and gold. Tailings would be collected and pumped, in slurry form, into a tailings basin. Polymet has stated its intent to reclaim mine land, and to set aside an assurance fund to ensure reclamation in the event that the mine should unexpectedly close.

Proponents of the mine have cited the generation of up to 500 jobs which could result from the mine and increased local and state tax revenue.

Critics have cited the large quantities of overburden, waste rock, and processing tailings which will be generated by the mine. Environmentalists have also cited water contamination by mercury and aluminum. Additionally, should the tailings basin leak or fail, drainage would move through Partridge, Embarrass, and St. Louis rivers, ultimately to Lake Superior. Polymet and its successor, NewRange, have attempted to allay fears of contamination by citing the development of new water purification techniques. Despite assurances made by Polymet that wetlands would be protected and restored where possible, the operations of the mine would permanently affect 912.5 acres of wetlands. The Minnesota Department of Natural Resources stated that the mine's operations would result in a 4,016-acre decrease in vegetation and wildlife habitat in the mine's project area. Minnesota DNR also stated that the mine's operations would decrease biodiversity, specifically threatening the habitat of Canada lynx in the area.
