= Arne Carlson =

American politician

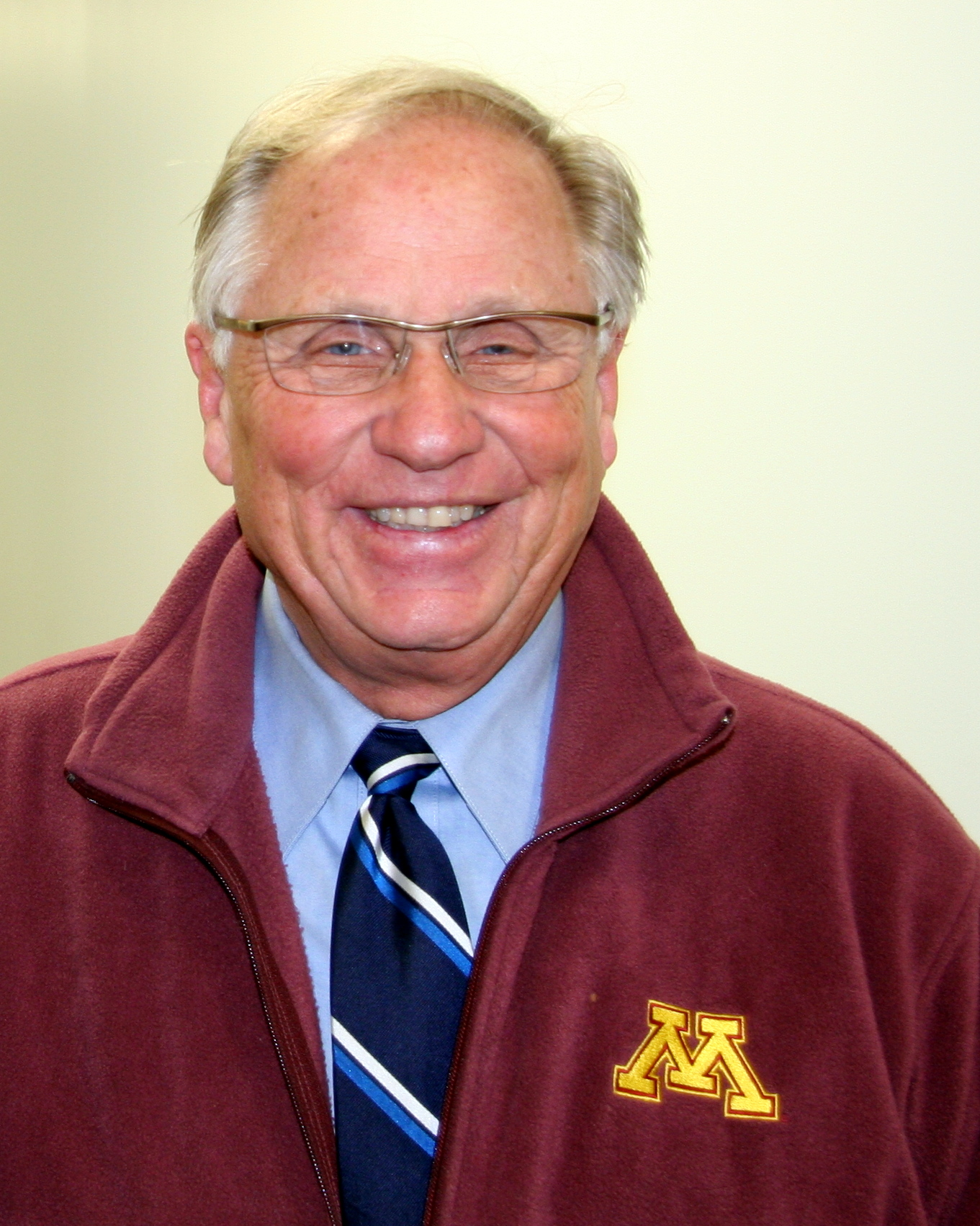
- Carlson in 2010

37th Governor of Minnesota
- In office January 7, 1991 – January 4, 1999
- Lieutenant: Joanell Dyrstad; Joanne Benson
- Preceded by: Rudy Perpich
- Succeeded by: Jesse Ventura

14th Auditor of Minnesota
- In office January 4, 1979 – January 7, 1991
- Governor: Al Quie; Rudy Perpich
- Preceded by: Bob Mattson
- Succeeded by: Mark Dayton

Member of the Minnesota House of Representatives
- In office January 5, 1971 – January 2, 1979
- Preceded by: Thor Anderson
- Succeeded by: Todd Otis
- Constituency: 36th district (1971–1973); District 58B (1973–1979)

Personal details
- Born: Arne Helge Carlson; September 24, 1934 (age 92) New York City, New York, U.S.
- Party: Democratic (before 1960); Republican (1960–present)
- Spouses: Barbara Duffy (m. 1965; div. 1977); Joanne Chabot (divorced); Susan Shepard
- Children: 3
- Education: Williams College (BA); University of Minnesota (attended)

Arne Helge Carlson (born September 24, 1934) is an American politician who served from 1991 to 1999 as the 37th governor of Minnesota. Carlson is considered a liberal Republican. He served as Minnesota State Auditor from 1979 to 1991.

Born into poverty in New York City, he attended the Choate Rosemary Hall preparatory school on a scholarship. After graduating from Williams College, he went to graduate school at the University of Minnesota. In his first race for elected office, Carlson was elected to the Minneapolis City Council in 1965 as a Republican. He served until 1967. With the Republicans in the majority, Carlson also served as city council majority leader. In 1967, he ran for mayor of Minneapolis against incumbent Democratic mayor Arthur Naftalin. Carlson lost the close election.

Carlson served in the Minnesota House of Representatives from 1971 until 1979, then as the Minnesota State Auditor from 1979 until 1991. He launched a bid for the Republican nomination for governor of Minnesota in 1990. He lost the primary election to businessman Jon Grunseth, but Grunseth became embroiled in two separate scandals weeks before the election and withdrew from the race, whereupon Carlson became the nominee. He defeated incumbent governor Rudy Perpich. In 1994, he easily won reelection to a second term. Since his return to private life in 1999, he has actively and exclusively supported Democratic (DFL) candidates while remaining a Republican.

== Early years, education and family ==
Born in New York City, Carlson is the son of Swedish immigrants from Gothenburg and Visby. He attended New York City public schools P.S. 36 and DeWitt Clinton High School in the Bronx before gaining a scholarship to attend The Choate School (now Choate Rosemary Hall) in Wallingford, Connecticut. He earned a Bachelor of Arts degree in history from Williams College in 1957 before taking graduate courses at the University of Minnesota.

== Career ==
=== Early career ===
Immediately after college, Carlson served as a claims adjuster, an experience he drew upon as state auditor.

Carlson served one term on the Minneapolis City Council from 1965 to 1967, and was the Republican nominee for mayor in 1967, losing to Democratic-Farmer-Labor incumbent Arthur Naftalin. He was a member of the Minnesota House of Representatives from 1971 to 1979. In 1978, he ran for and was elected state auditor. He was reelected in 1982 and 1986. As state auditor, Carlson worked to create uniform accounting for cities, counties, townships, and special districts, making Minnesota a leader in uniform accounting. He attempted to turn the state budget deficit into a surplus, using vetoes to limit spending. He also overhauled the state's multi-billion-dollar pension investment portfolio to allow private sector management.

=== Election in 1990 ===
Carlson's long tenure as auditor, in addition to his noted speaking abilities, made him a leading contender for the Republican nomination in 1990. But although he initially led in public opinion surveys, his status as a moderate or even liberal Republican made him unpopular among party activists. They instead backed Carlson's primary rival, businessman Jon Grunseth, a younger and more right-wing candidate who had never held elected office.

Grunseth defeated Carlson in the primary. In the general election polling, Grunseth was the favorite to defeat the incumbent governor and DFL nominee, Rudy Perpich, the state's longest-serving governor. But a scandal arose in mid-October, three weeks before the election, after the Star Tribune published a front-page article with an account that, in 1981, Grunseth had invited three then-teenaged friends of his stepdaughter, as well as his stepdaughter herself, to go skinny-dipping in the pool at his home. Although three of the four girls corroborated the report, Grunseth denied any improper conduct, and suggested that Perpich had orchestrated the allegations.

On October 15, 1990, with 15 days of campaigning left before Election Day, Carlson revived his campaign for governor as a write-in candidate, and took part in an unusual three-way debate broadcast by Twin Cities Public Television, which became the highest-rated locally produced program in the station's history. Grunseth initially refused to drop out, thus splitting the Republican vote and providing an opportunity for Perpich to win reelection. But nine days before the election—after vacillating for days and after another Star Tribune article reported that Grunseth had a lengthy extramarital affair—Grunseth withdrew. As the runner-up in the primary, the Independent-Republican Party Executive Committee declared Carlson the Republican nominee. Five days before the election, in a 5–2 decision, the state Supreme Court ruled that Carlson was eligible to appear on the ballot. In the November 6 general election, Carlson defeated Perpich by 3.3 percentage points, 50% to 47%.

=== Tenure ===
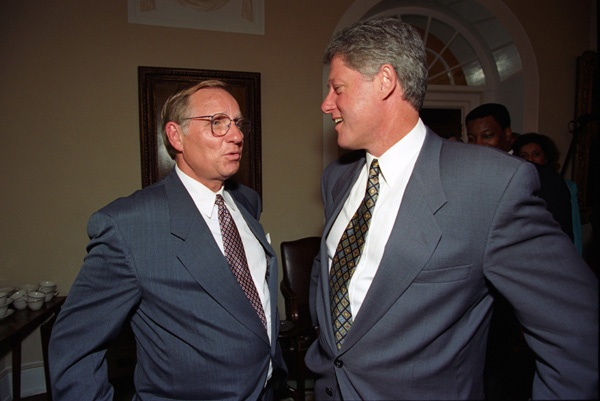
Carlson with President Bill Clinton in 1993

Carlson was elected the 37th governor of Minnesota and served from January 7, 1991, to January 4, 1999. He won as a member of the Independent-Republican Party. In September 1995, the party changed its name to the "Republican Party". Carlson was the last of five Scandinavian-American progressive Republicans to serve as governor of Minnesota.

During his administration, Carlson worked to solve an inherited $2 billion state budget deficit. By the end of his term, the state had surpluses of $2.3 billion in FY1997 and $1.9 billion in FY1998. His administration restored the AAA bond rating from all three Wall Street major bond houses. Minnesota became the first state to receive such an upgrade in 25 years.

Carlson increased funding for elementary and secondary education by 9%, created a top-level Children's Cabinet to develop a single integrated agenda and budget for all state children's programs and initiatives, laid the groundwork for the first light rail in Minneapolis with state and federal funding of $160 million, and got school choice funded, which The Wall Street Journal hailed as a model for the rest of the country.

In 1993, Carlson served as chairman of the Midwestern Governors Association. That same year he signed into law the Minnesota Human Rights Act, which banned LGBT discrimination in housing, employment, and education.

In June 1994, delegates to the Minnesota Republican Party State Convention viewed Carlson, who supported gay rights and abortion rights, as liberal. The party's right wing dominated the selection of convention delegates, and Carlson won only 29% of the vote at the convention, with Allen Quist, a figure popular among grassroots Christian right activists, winning 69%. Carlson called Quist a "cult leader with a Messianic complex", and in the September primary, Carlson and running mate Joanne Benson won renomination by a 2:1 margin, with the endorsement of business groups, every major newspaper in the state, and the Teamsters union. Carlson won the November 1994 general election by a large margin, 63% to 34%, over Democratic nominee John Marty.

As governor, Carlson was known as a fan of the University of Minnesota and its sports teams; his official portrait in the Minnesota State Capitol shows him wearing a letter jacket from the school. He worked closely with the university's president, Mark Yudof, on improving its physical plant, and in 1998 proposed and secured passage of a capital improvement package for all higher education with $206 million earmarked for the University of Minnesota. That led to projects ranging from building a molecular and cellular Biology Center to major renovations and upgrades to Walter Library.

=== Post-governorship ===
In 1999, after leaving office, Carlson was appointed to the board of directors of the IDS Mutual Fund Group, which was part of the American Express Financial Advisors, a Minneapolis-based company. He was named chairman and CEO of the board the next year.

Carlson has remained politically active in retirement. In 2010, he announced that he would embark on a "Paul Revere" tour of Minnesota to bring attention to the state's fiscal problems. During the 2011 Minnesota state government shutdown, which occurred after Governor Mark Dayton and state legislative leaders could not agree on a budget, Carlson collaborated with Walter Mondale and several other prominent political and business leaders to propose a nonpartisan budget commission.

In a 2001 MPR-St. Paul Pioneer Press poll Carlson ranked second (behind Hubert Humphrey) among prominent Minnesota political figures for their contributions to the state. Fifty-seven percent of those surveyed said Carlson made a "great or major contribution" to the state.

In retirement, Carlson has often endorsed Democratic candidates over Republicans. He endorsed Barack Obama in the 2008 presidential election, Hillary Clinton over Donald Trump in 2016, Joe Biden over Trump in 2020, and Kamala Harris over Trump in 2024. He also endorsed Tim Walz over Randy Demmer in the 2010 U.S. House of Representatives election, and the same year broke with his party to endorse Independence Party candidate Tom Horner in the gubernatorial race. In December 2010, as part of a post-election party purge of moderates, the Minnesota Republican Party Central Committee narrowly voted to ban Carlson and 17 others from participating in party events for two years.

Carlson was an outspoken critic of Joan Gabel's performance as president of the University of Minnesota.

Carlson and Mondale also teamed to oppose a voter identification amendment to the state constitution in the 2012 election. The amendment was defeated.

Carlson is a longtime campaign finance reform proponent. He is a member of the ReFormers Caucus of Issue One, and has criticized the impacts of the Supreme Court's Citizens United decision. In 2012, he teamed up with his former rival, John Marty, to support legislation that would prohibit corporations with more than 20% foreign ownership from donating to political campaigns, and to require board of directors or executive councils to approve political contributions made by the corporation or union, rather than allowing executives or presidents to make such contributions unilaterally.

Carlson is a longtime opponent of the PolyMet Mine project, which has been delayed since 2005 by legal challenges related to its environmental risk. He has cited the project as an example of the Minnesota government's corruption and influence by "monied interests".

== Personal life ==
Carlson was married to Barbara Carlson (née Duffy) from 1965 to 1977. After their divorce she became known in her own right as a Minneapolis city councilwoman and talk show personality. They had three children. Carlson's second wife was Joanne Chabot. They had no children. After their divorce, he married Susan Shepard, with whom he has a daughter. Susan served as First Lady of Minnesota from 1991 to 1999.

== Electoral history ==
1978 Minnesota state auditor election
Party	Candidate	Votes	%	±%
Ind.-Republican	Arne Carlson	773,150	51.83	+4.22
Democratic (DFL)	Robert W. Mattson Jr. (incumbent)	695,943	46.66	−5.73
Communist	Helen S. Kruth	22,576	1.51	N/A

1982 Minnesota state auditor election
Party	Candidate	Votes	%	±%
Ind.-Republican	Arne Carlson (incumbent)	932,925	54.81	+2.98
Democratic (DFL)	Paul Wellstone	769,254	45.19	−1.47

1986 Minnesota state auditor election
Party	Candidate	Votes	%	±%
Ind.-Republican	Arne Carlson (incumbent)	747,219	55.1	+0.29
Democratic (DFL)	John Dooley	608,913	44.9	−

1990 Minnesota gubernatorial election
Party	Candidate	Votes	%	±%
Ind.-Republican	Arne Carlson	895,988	50.11%	+7.02%
Democratic (DFL)	Rudy Perpich (incumbent)	836,218	46.76%	−9.35%
EarthRIGHT	Heart Warrior Chosa	21,139	1.18%	n/a
Grassroots	Ross S. Culverhouse	17,176	0.96%	n/a
Ind.-Republican	Jon Grunseth	10,941	0.61%	n/a
Socialist Workers	Wendy Lyons	6,701	0.37%	n/a

1994 Minnesota gubernatorial election
Party	Candidate	Votes	%	±%
Ind.-Republican	Arne Carlson (incumbent)	1,094,165	63.34%	+13.24%
Democratic (DFL)	John Marty	589,344	34.12%	−12.65%
Grassroots	Will Shetterly	20,785	1.20%	+0.24%
Libertarian	Eric Olson	15,467	0.90%	n/a
Natural Rights Alliance	Leslie Davis	4,611	0.27%	n/a
Socialist Workers	Jon Hillson	3,022	0.17%	n/a

Party political offices
Preceded by Rolland Hatfield	Republican nominee for Auditor of Minnesota; 1978, 1982, 1986	Succeeded by Bob Heinrich
Preceded by Jon Grunseth; Withdrew	Republican nominee for Governor of Minnesota; 1990, 1994	Succeeded by Norm Coleman
Political offices
Preceded by Bob Mattson	Auditor of Minnesota; 1979–1991	Succeeded by Mark Dayton
Preceded by Rudy Perpich	Governor of Minnesota; 1991–1999	Succeeded by Jesse Ventura
U.S. order of precedence (ceremonial)
Preceded by Martha McSally as Former U.S. Senator	Order of precedence of the United States; Within Minnesota	Succeeded by Jesse Ventura as Former Governor
Preceded by Arnold Schwarzenegger as Former Governor	Order of precedence of the United States; Outside Minnesota	Succeeded by Jesse Ventura as Former Governor
