= Humphrey–Mondale Awards =

The Humphrey–Mondale Awards are a series of six awards issued annually by the Minnesota Democratic–Farmer–Labor Party (DFL). Not every award is issued annually. The award is presented by the State Chair of the DFL. The award ceremony, the Humphrey–Mondale Dinner, is named for Hubert Humphrey and Walter Mondale. The ceremony and issuing of the awards began in 2012.

== Hubert H. Humphrey Award ==
The Hubert H. Humphrey Award for Dedication and Leadership to the Minnesota DFL is awarded to individuals who have contributed to the internal operations of the party. It is named after former Senator and Vice President Hubert Humphrey, who served as a leading figure within the party and de facto leader from 1952 until 1968. In 2026, the award was not given to an individual, but to all constitutional observers during Operation Metro Surge.

Recipients include:

- Constitutional Observers (2026)
- Michael "Kenner" Kory Kennedy (2025) (Note: posthumous, Kennedy died three months before the awards ceremony)
- Heidi Kraus Kaplan (2024)
- Ron Harris (2023)
- Cheryl Poling (2022)
- Nancy Larson (2014)
- Lil Ortendahl (2012)

== Joan and Walter Mondale Award ==
The Joan and Walter Mondale Award for Public Service is awarded to individuals who are considered by the party to be most influential in legislation and policy victories. It is named after former Senator and Vice President Walter Mondale, and his wife, Joan Mondale.

Recipients include:

- Tim Walz and Tina Smith (2026)
- Athena Hollins (2025)
- Peggy Flanagan (2024)
- Melissa Hortman (2023)
- Melisa López Franzen (2022)
- Betty McCollum (2017)
- Yvonne Prettner Solon (2014)
- Mike Hatch (2013)

== Joan Growe Award ==
The Joan Growe Award for Distinguished Commitment to Expanding Access to Democracy and Justice in Minnesota is awarded to individuals who have contributed to the state's democratic process and voting rights. It is named after former Minnesota Secretary of State Joan Growe.

Recipients include:

- Steve Simon (2026)
- Wintana Melekin (2025)
- Emma Greenman (2024)
- Bobby Joe Champion (2023)
- Carlos Mariani (2022)
- Rena Moran (2017)

== Melissa & Mark Hortman Award ==
The Melissa & Mark Hortman Award for Dedication and Leadership in Public Policy was created in 2026 following the assassinations of Melissa Hortman, her husband, Mark Hortman, and the Hortman's dog, Gilbert. The award is given to public servants who have been responsible for enactment of public policy. In 2026, the award to given to the entirety of Melissa Hortman's senior staff.

Recipients include:

- Sean Rahn, Ted Modrich, Chris McCall, Kevin Labenz, Tara Schaefle, Matt Roznowski, Alayna Smieja, Laura Sparkman (2026)

== Orville L. Freeman Award ==
The Orville L. Freeman Award for Distinguished Service to Greater Minnesota and Agricultural Issues is awarded to individuals who have majorly contributed to the state's agriculture, and to the state as a whole outside of the Twin Cities. The award is named after former governor and United States Secretary of Agriculture Orville Freeman.

Recipients include:

- Gary Wertish (2025)
- Jovita Morales (2024)
- Mary Murphy (2023)
- Paul Marquart (2022)
- Colleen Landkamer (2017)
- Dave Frederickson (2014)
- Thom Petersen (2013)

== Paul D. Wellstone Award ==
The Paul D. Wellstone Award for Lifetime Commitment to Organized Labor is awarded to individuals who contribute to the party's relation with labor unions. The award is named for former Senator Paul Wellstone.

Recipients include:

- Andy Snope (2025)
- Bethany Winkels (2024)
- Paul Slattery (2023)
- Rick Varo (2022)
- Bernie Hesse and Kris Fredson (2015)
- Harry Melander (2014)
