= The Police Tapes =

1977 American documentary film

- Created by: Alan and Susan Raymond
- Country of origin: United States
- Original language: English

Production
- Running time: 90 min.
- Production company: Video Verité

Original release
- Network: WNET
- Release: 1977

The Police Tapes is a 1977 documentary about a New York City police precinct in the South Bronx. The original ran ninety minutes and was produced for public television; a one-hour version later aired on ABC.

== Production ==
Filmmakers Alan and Susan Raymond spent three months in 1976 riding along with patrol officers in the 44th Precinct of the South Bronx, which had the highest crime rate in New York City at that time. They produced about 40 hours of videotape that they edited into a 90-minute documentary.

The result was what New York Times TV critic John J. O'Connor called a "startlingly graphic and convincing survey of urban crime, violence, brutality and cynical despair". Cases followed include the discovery of a dead body on the street, the rescue of a mother trapped in her apartment by a mentally ill son, an attempt to negotiate with a woman armed with an improvised flail who refuses to stop threatening her neighbor, and the arrest of a 70-year-old woman accused of hitting her daughter in the face with an axe.

There is some introductory narration at the beginning describing the neighborhood at the time the documentary was filmed. Some unifying commentary is also provided by an interview with Bronx Borough Commander Anthony Bouza, who ascribes the crime rate in the 44th Precinct to poverty, describes the hardening effects of urban violence on idealistic police officers, and likens himself to the commander of an occupying army, saying "We are manufacturing criminals... we are manufacturing brutality."

The production was financed by the New York State Council on the Arts and WNET and cost only $2,000, thanks to the use of Portapak tape equipment; it would have cost an estimated $90,000 if film had been used. Special Newvicon tubes in the video cameras allowed them to tape with only streetlights for illumination, making them less conspicuous to subjects who might otherwise have fled from or approached the cameras.

== Accolades ==
It won two Emmy Awards, a Peabody Award, and a DuPont-Columbia University Award for Broadcast Journalism.

== Influence and legacy ==
The Police Tapes was an important source for Fort Apache, The Bronx, a 1981 film with Paul Newman and Ed Asner. It influenced the deliberately ragged visual style of the 1980s television police drama Hill Street Blues, which used handheld cameras to provide a sense of realism and immediacy—particularly during the morning roll call in each episode, which was based on a similar scene in The Police Tapes.

Robert Butler, who directed the first five episodes, urged the camera operators to avoid carefully composed shots and to move their cameras frequently, telling them "If you're having trouble focusing, that's great." This mock-documentary style, in turn, influenced many other television dramas.

Another line of influence runs from The Police Tapes to the Fox Network reality TV series COPS. COPS, like its predecessor, closely follows police officers, suspects, and crime victims with handheld cameras. According to New York Times film critic Elvis Mitchell, the style of COPS then became part of the visual language of feature films, so that "the DNA of [the Raymonds'] original has found its way into the film mainstream."
