= Sebastian Ellefson =

American politician

Member-elect of the Minnesota House of Representatives from the 65B district
- Assuming office January 2027
- Succeeding: María Isa Pérez-Vega

Personal details
- Party: Democratic (DFL)

Sebastian Ellefson is an American politician. A member of the Democratic–Farmer–Labor Party, he is the member-elect for the 65B district of the Minnesota House of Representatives.
