= María Isa Pérez-Vega =

American politician and musician

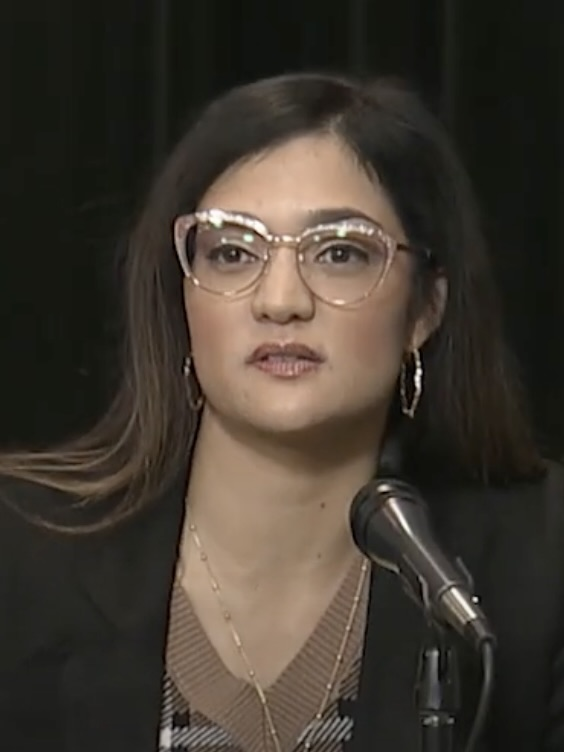
- Pérez-Vega in 2022

Member of the Minnesota House of Representatives from the 65B district
- Incumbent
- Assumed office January 3, 2023
- Preceded by: Carlos Mariani
- Succeeded by: Sebastian Ellefson (elect)

Personal details
- Born: May 1, 1987 (age 39) Saint Paul, Minnesota, U.S.
- Party: Democratic (DFL)
- Children: 1
- Education: Columbia College Chicago
- Occupation: Business owner; Musician; Legislator
- Website: Government website Campaign website

María Isa Pérez-Vega (born May 1, 1987) is an American politician and musician serving in the Minnesota House of Representatives since 2023. A member of the Minnesota Democratic-Farmer-Labor Party (DFL), Pérez-Vega represents District 65B in the Twin Cities metropolitan area, which includes part of Saint Paul, West St. Paul, and parts of Dakota and Ramsey Counties.

== Early life, education and career ==
Pérez-Vega was born in on the West Side of Saint Paul, Minnesota, to parents of Puerto Rican heritage. Governor Rudy Perpich appointed her mother as the first Latina to direct the office of equal opportunity. Pérez-Vega graduated from Columbia College Chicago with a degree in cultural studies.

In 2018, Pérez-Vega traveled to Puerto Rico to help with the recovery effort in the aftermath of Hurricane Maria, helping raise more than $270,000 for a fund with the St. Paul Foundation. She also helped raise awareness and funds in the aftermath of massive earthquakes in 2020 and Hurricane Fiona in 2022.

In 2020, Pérez-Vega supported Bernie Sanders in the 2020 Democratic Party presidential primaries. She was active in the DFL Latino Caucus, which relaunched under the banner "Movimiento".

Pérez-Vega was friends with George Floyd, who was murdered by Minneapolis police officer Derek Chauvin in May 2020, and after his death she said Floyd was a "gentle, precious, funny giant".

=== Music career ===
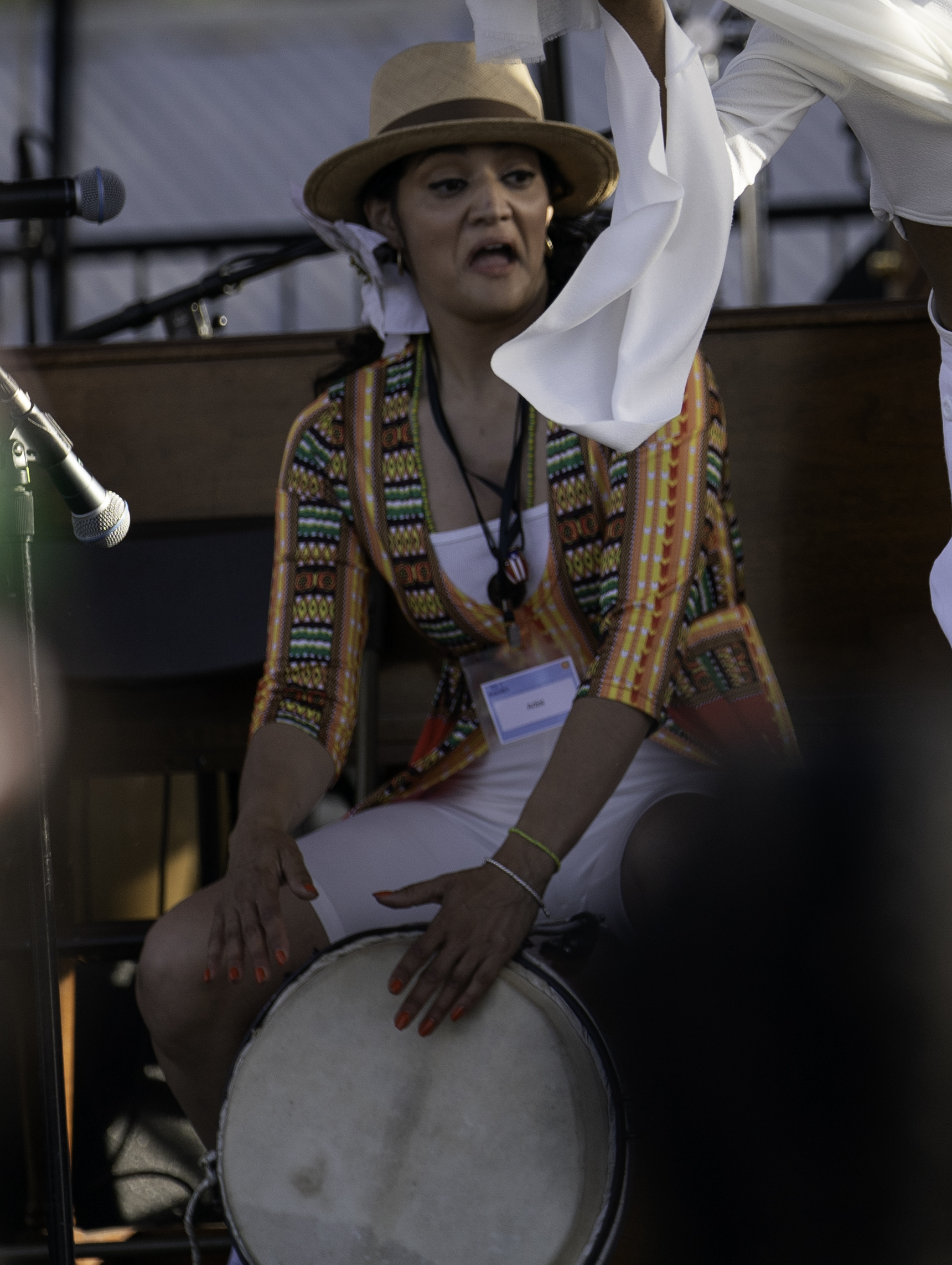
Pérez-Vega performing in 2021

Pérez-Vega is a rapper and singer and has been active in the Twin Cities hip-hop scene since she was a teenager. She owns the record company SotaRico, whose name honors her Minnesotan and Puerto Rican roots.

In 2018, Pérez-Vega performed at the 32nd annual Governor's Council Martin Luther King Jr. Day Celebration at the State Capitol and the Minnesota Women's March. In 2020, she performed at Bernie Sanders's Saint Paul rally during his presidential campaign.

On the day Pérez-Vega was sworn in as a state representative at the Minnesota House, she released a new LP, Capitolio (Spanish for "capital"), and announced she would continue to make music while in office. On the day of the release, Pérez-Vega said, "I wanted people to know I'm still me, still a hip-hop artist and mother and girl from the West Side, and I'm bringing all that with me to the Capitol".

== Minnesota House of Representatives ==
Pérez-Vega was first elected to the Minnesota House of Representatives in 2022. She first ran after legislative redistricting and the retirement of 16-term DFL incumbent Carlos Mariani.

Pérez-Vega serves on the Children and Families Finance and Policy, Education Finance, and Housing Finance and Policy Committees. In 2023, Governor Tim Walz appointed her to the Capitol Area Community Vitality Task Force.

Pérez-Vega is not seeking reelection in 2026, instead running for the Ramsey County Commission.

=== Political positions ===
Pérez-Vega co-led efforts to pass "Driver's Licenses For All" legislation alongside Aisha Gomez, which was passed by both chambers and signed by Governor Tim Walz on March 7, 2023. The bill would allow undocumented immigrants to obtain driver's licenses in the state after then-Governor Tim Pawlenty revoked the right in 2003. Pérez-Vega was in high school when the change was made and has spoken about the bill's positive impacts in the immigrant community.

In 2023, Pérez-Vega joined Muslim legislators and community leaders following a suspected arson at a mosque in Saint Paul, saying the fires amounted to terrorism against the Muslim community.

== Electoral history ==
2022 Minnesota State House - District 65B
Party	Candidate	Votes	%
Democratic (DFL)	Maria Isa Pérez-Hedges	11,995	78.54
Republican	Kevin Fjelsted	3,247	21.33
Write-in		19	0.12
Total votes		15,221	100.0
Democratic (DFL) hold			

2024 Minnesota State House - District 65B
Party	Candidate	Votes	%
Democratic (DFL)	María Isa Pérez-Vega (incumbent)	15,100	76.51
Republican	Mike Hilborn	4,572	23.17
Write-in		63	0.32
Total votes		19,735	100.0
Democratic (DFL) hold			

== Personal life ==
Pérez-Vega lives in the West Side of Saint Paul and has one child. She is of Puerto Rican descent. Pérez-Vega was previously married to Twin Cities rapper Robert Hedges, who uses the stage name Muja Messiah.
