= NorthMet Deposit =

The NorthMet Deposit is a deposit of minerals located in northeastern Minnesota contained within the geological region known as the Duluth Complex. The minerals contained in the deposit include copper, nickel, platinum, silver, palladium, and titanium.

== Background ==
The NorthMet Deposit is located at the eastern end of the Mesabi Iron Range in St. Louis County, Minnesota near the cities of Babbitt and Hoyt Lakes. Geologists have discovered that the deposit contains copper, nickel, silver, platinum, titanium, and palladium. Geologists estimate that the deposits totals about four billion tons and could be worth of one trillion dollars. The precious metals contained within the deposit are essential for items such as computers, cell phones, and cars. The rights to this deposit can be privately leased and are currently being leased by Polymet Mining Corporation.

== Controversy ==
Although PolyMet controls the rights to the deposit, there is much controversy about whether they should be able to mine it. These minerals would be harvested through the traditional Polymet Mining Corporation process. The problem with mining these types of minerals using this process is that the minerals contain sulfites which can cause acid mine drainage or mercury related problems. This causes the water from the surrounding areas including the Boundary Waters Canoe Area Wilderness to not be up to Minnesota water standards. Therefore, the water must be treated before it will be usable and safe to drink. The amount of time that this water will need to be treated is unclear, as it can't be modeled. Proponents of mining the deposit think that the economic benefit would outweigh the possible environmental costs. The debate is the largest Minnesota's DNR has ever seen, with the public filing more than 49,000 comments on the issue.
