= Carl M. Johnson =

American politician (1933–2025)

Carl M. Johnson (September 12, 1933 – April 15, 2025) was an American farmer, businessman, and politician.

Johnson lived in St. Peter, Minnesota, with his wife and family and was a businessman and farmer. Johnson went to Gaylord High School in Gaylord, Minnesota. He served in the United States Army during the Korean War. Johnson received his bachelor's degree in history and industrial arts from Minnesota State University, Mankato. Johnson served in the Minnesota House of Representatives from 1967 to 1982 and was a Democrat.
