= Tony Bouza =

American police chief (1928–2023)

- Born: Antonio Vila Bouza; October 4, 1928; Mugardos, Spain
- Died: June 26, 2023 (aged 94); Bloomington, Minnesota, U.S.
- Citizenship: Spain; United States
- Education: Baruch University (BBA, MPA)
- Occupations: U.S. law enforcement, New York City and Minneapolis
- Spouse: Vivien "Erica" Blume (m. 1957)
- Children: 2

Anthony Vila Bouza (October 4, 1928 – June 26, 2023) was an American police officer who served in the New York City Police Department and as police chief of the Minneapolis Police Department from 1980 to 1989.

== Biography ==
Born on October 4, 1928, in the place of O Seixo, Mugardos, Galicia, Spain, Bouza came to the United States with his family at age nine, escaping the Spanish Civil War. His father José Antonio, worked in the boiler room for the Merchant Navy, while his mother Encarnación, was a professional seamstress. The family settled in Brooklyn, a borough of New York City. He graduated from Manual Training High School in Brooklyn in 1947. He served in the U.S. Army, and then worked briefly in sales in the garment industry in Manhattan.

Bouza joined the New York City Police Department in 1953. He was promoted to inspector in 1971, deputy chief inspector in 1972, and assistant chief in 1973. He served in the NYPD until 1976. In 1976, Bouza was featured in the seminal TV documentary The Police Tapes. He served as Deputy Chief of the New York City Transit Police from 1977 to 1979.

Donald Fraser, who was newly elected as mayor of Minneapolis in 1980, brought in Bouza to be his police chief. Fraser wanted an outsider and a reformer to head the department following a series of scandals under his predecessor. He retained Bouza for a total of three three-year terms.

Bouza had a difficult relationship with the police officers he led in Minneapolis. Within weeks of becoming chief, Bouza reduced the number of police precincts from 6 to 4 and replaced two-member squads with single-member squads in most of the city. Officers blamed the 1981 murder of police officer Richard P. Miller on the switch to single-member squads. In a cost-cutting move, he also instituted a promotion freeze that ran until 1986.

After stepping down as chief, Bouza served as Minnesota gaming commissioner from 1989 to 1991 and then briefly as director of the Center to Prevent Handgun Violence in Washington, D.C. In 1994, Bouza unsuccessfully sought the Democratic Farmer Labor Party nomination for Governor of Minnesota. He lost the nomination to John Marty.

After retiring from policing, Bouza testified for the defense in many trials across the country alleging police mistreatment.

== Education and writing ==
Bouza graduated from Baruch University with a Bachelor of Business Administration in 1965 and a Master of Public Administration in 1968.

Bouza was author of nine books, including trade books: The Police Mystique: An Insider's Look at Cops, Crime, and the Criminal Justice System (1990), A Carpet of Blue: An Ex-Cop Takes a Tough Look at America's Drug Problem (1991), Police Unbound: Corruption, Abuse, and Heroism by the Boys in Blue (2001), The Decline and Fall of the American Empire: Corruption, Decadence, and the American Dream (2003), and Expert Witness: Breaking the Policemen's Blue Code of Silence (2013), as well as two technical books: Police Intelligence: The Operations of an Investigative Unit (AMS Press, 1976) and Police Administration (Elsevier, 1978).

Bouza wrote a monthly column for the Minneapolis community paper Southside Pride.

== Personal life ==
Bouza's wife, Erica Bouza, who was born in the United Kingdom, was arrested repeatedly for engaging in anti-militarism protests against Honeywell while Bouza was Minneapolis police chief in the 1980s. The Bouzas married in 1957 and had two sons, Anthony Jr. and Dominick.

Bouza died on June 26, 2023, at the age of 94. His wife died a few months later on December 14, 2023, at the age of 92.
