= Clark Johnson (politician) =

American politician

Member of the Minnesota House of Representatives from the 19A district
- In office February 19, 2013 – January 7, 2019
- Preceded by: Terry Morrow (District 23A)
- Succeeded by: Jeff Brand

Personal details
- Born: July 21, 1952 (age 74) Fargo, North Dakota
- Party: Minnesota Democratic–Farmer–Labor Party
- Spouse: April Moen
- Children: 2
- Education: Michigan State University (B.A.); Minnesota State University, Mankato (B.S., M.S.)

Clark P. Johnson (born July 21, 1952) is an American politician and former member of the Minnesota House of Representatives. A member of the Minnesota Democratic–Farmer–Labor Party (DFL), he represented District 19A in south-central Minnesota.

== Early life and education ==
Johnson was born in Fargo, North Dakota. He attended Michigan State University, graduating in 1974 with a B.A. in social science. He later attended Minnesota State University, Mankato, graduating in 1985 with a B.S. in social studies education and again in 1990, graduating with a M.S.

== Minnesota House of Representatives ==
Johnson was first elected to the Minnesota House of Representatives in a special election in 2013.

== Personal life ==
Johnson is married to his wife, April Moen. They have two daughters and reside in North Mankato, Minnesota. He is a faculty member at Minnesota State University, Mankato.
