= John Marty =

American politician (born 1956)

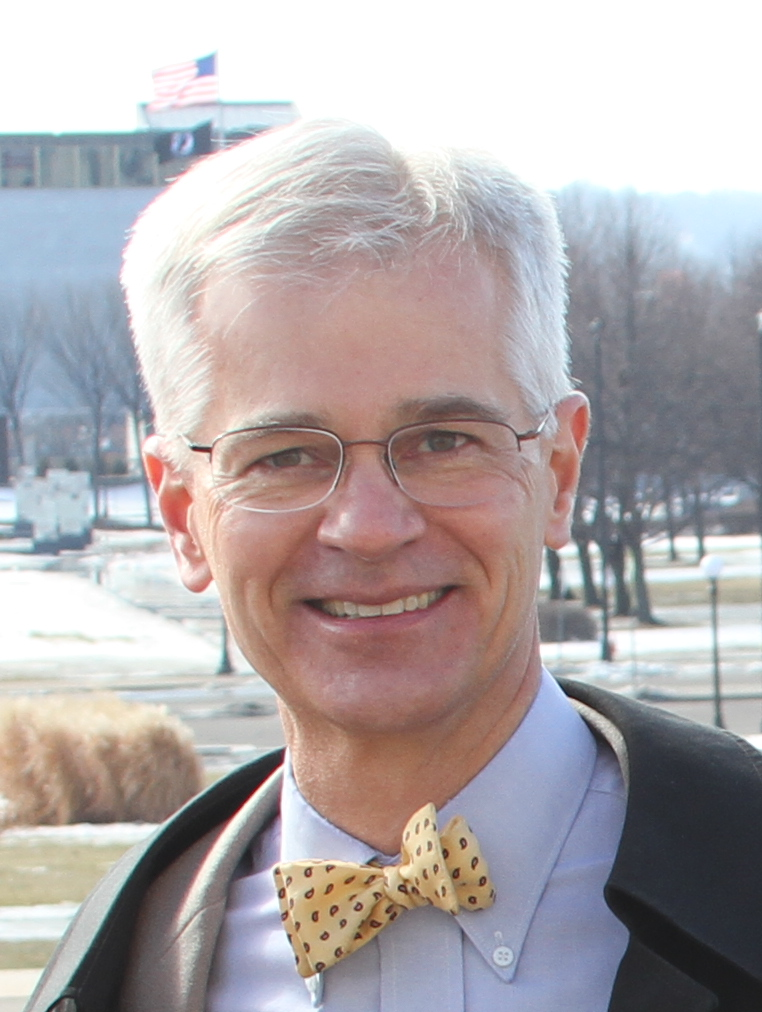
- Marty in 2022

Member of the Minnesota Senate
- Incumbent
- Assumed office January 6, 1987
- Preceded by: Neil Dieterich
- Constituency: 63rd district (1987–1993); 54th district (1993–2013); 66th district (2013–2023); 40th district (2023–present)

Personal details
- Born: November 1, 1956 (age 70) Evanston, Illinois, U.S.
- Party: Minnesota Democratic-Farmer-Labor Party
- Spouse: Connie Jaarsma
- Education: St. Olaf College (BA)

John J. Marty (born November 1, 1956) is a member of the Minnesota Senate, representing District 40, which includes parts of Ramsey County in the northern Twin Cities metropolitan area. As a young state senator, he ran for governor of Minnesota in 1994. He won the DFL nomination and the Democratic primary but lost the general election to the incumbent governor, Arne Carlson. Marty ran for governor again in 2010, but withdrew from the race after failing to win his party's endorsement.

As senator, Marty represents Roseville, Arden Hills, Shoreview, New Brighton, and Mounds View.

== Early life, education and career ==
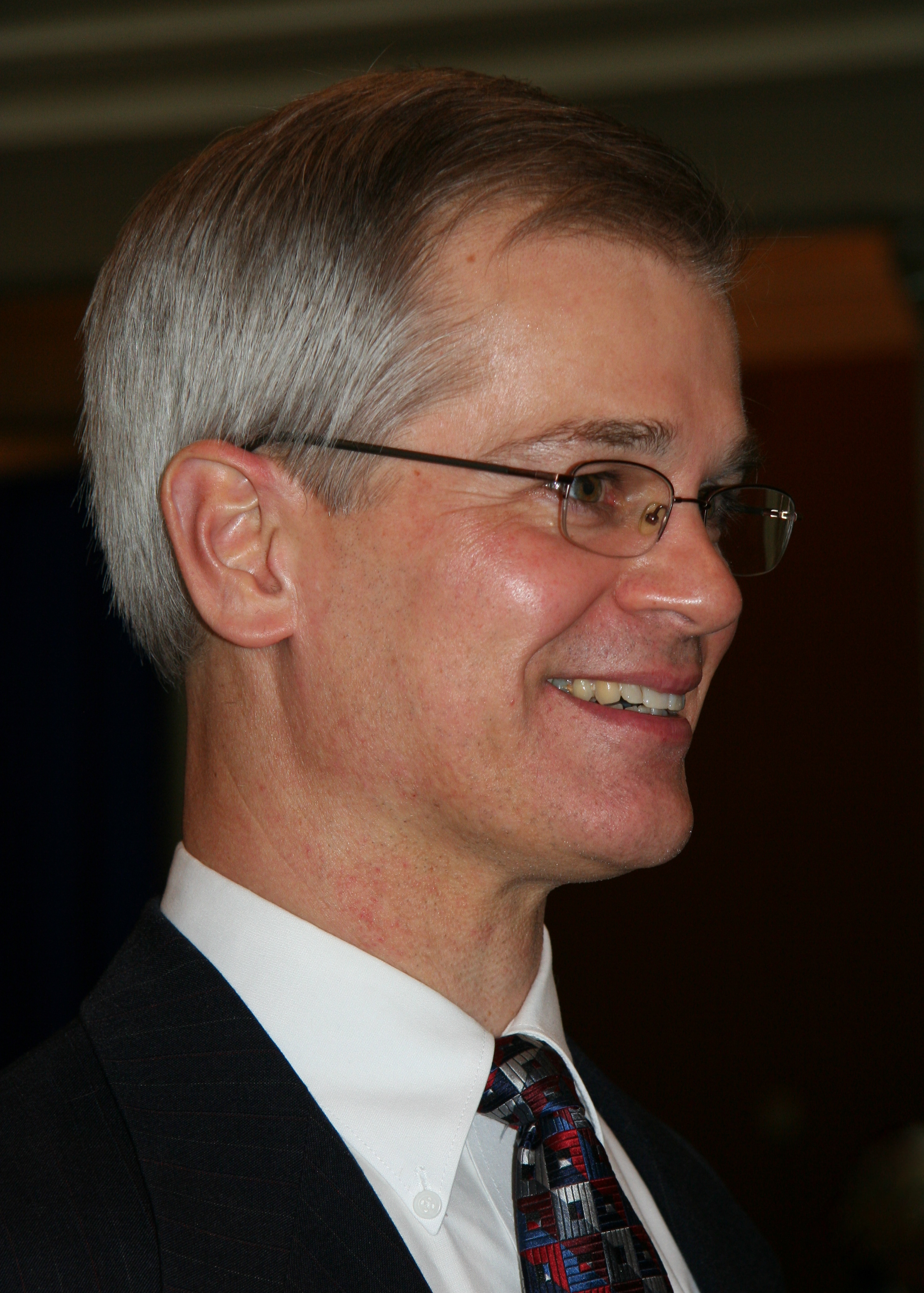
Marty in 2011

John Marty was born in Evanston, Illinois, on November 1, 1956. He is the son of author and theologian Martin E. Marty. He attended St. Olaf College, graduating with a BA in ethics in 1978. In 1979 and 1980 he worked in the DFL Party as a campaign aide and communications director. He became an administrator and researcher for the Criminal Justice Committee of the Minnesota House of Representatives in 1980, before working as a grant administrator at the Lutheran Brotherhood Foundation for two years beginning in 1985. After his election to the Minnesota Senate in 1986, Marty became a member of the board of directors of the National Youth Leadership Council. From 1993 to 1996, he served on the board of Goodwill/Easter Seals Minnesota, a local nonprofit organization.

== Political career ==
=== State legislator: 1987–present ===
Marty was elected state senator from District 63 on November 4, 1986, and sworn in on January 6, 1987, for the 75th legislative session. The 1992 legislative redistricting, in conjunction with the U.S. census, changed Marty's district from 63 to 54.

On November 7, 2006, Marty was reelected to a sixth term, winning 62% of the vote and carrying each of the seven suburbs in his district.

The 2012 legislative redistricting changed Marty's district from 54 to 66.

=== 1994 gubernatorial campaign ===
In 1994, Marty sought to unseat incumbent Republican governor Arne Carlson. He was the DFL nominee, winning its primary by two percentage points over former state commerce commissioner and future attorney general Mike Hatch (the other candidates were Richard T. Van Bergen and former Minneapolis Police Chief Tony Bouza.) Marty's self-imposed campaign finance limits, feasible in his small state senate reelection campaigns, severely handicapped his ability to reach as far as his opponent statewide. After spending most of his campaign funds on the primary, he lost to Carlson by a nearly two-to-one margin.

Marty was one of seven DFLers who entered the 1998 gubernatorial campaign, but he dropped out of the race without filing for office. Eventually the party nominated state Attorney General Hubert H. "Skip" Humphrey III. In an upset, the Reform Party nominee, former professional wrestler Jesse Ventura, won the election.

=== 2010 gubernatorial campaign ===
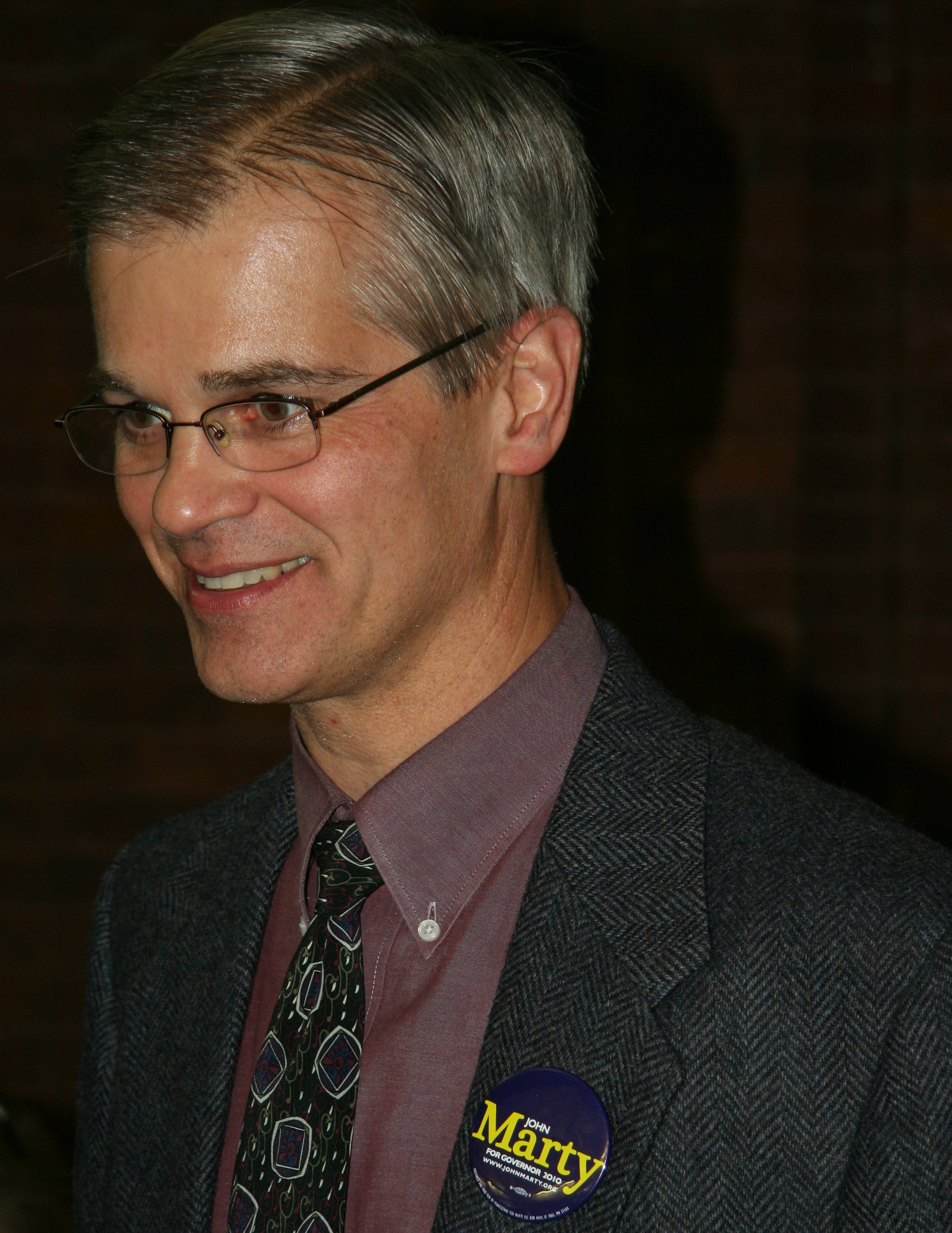
John Marty campaigning for governor

On December 22, 2008, Marty announced that he had launched an exploratory campaign for governor after encouragement from health care reformers. He made a formal announcement several months later.

On February 2, 2010, Marty finished in fourth place in a precinct caucus straw poll with 9.5% of the vote, behind Minneapolis mayor R. T. Rybak and Speaker of the Minnesota House Margaret Anderson Kelliher, who each received more than 20%. Uncommitted voters came in third, with approximately 14.7%.

On March 31, 2010, Marty announced state senator Patricia Torres Ray as his running mate.

On April 24, 2010, Marty withdrew from the race at the DFL state convention after it became clear he could not win the endorsement. He gave his support to Kelliher, whom the party endorsed.

=== Support for other politicians ===
When the national Democratic Party was picking its 2004 presidential nominee, Marty joined State Senate Majority Leader John Hottinger in endorsing Congressman Dennis Kucinich of Ohio. On Super Tuesday, Kucinich received 17% of the vote in Minnesota's presidential caucus, one of his best showings that year. During the 2008 presidential campaign, Marty was a strong supporter of Barack Obama.

== Political positions ==
Marty is best known to Minnesota residents as an advocate on environmental issues, health-care reform, and government ethics and campaign-finance reform. He is the author of the Minnesota Health Plan, a comprehensive single-payer healthcare plan. In 2016, he wrote a book, Healing Healthcare, that makes the case for a universal healthcare system. Marty does not accept soft money contributions or contributions from lobbyists, and sharply limits the contributions he will accept from any one person. Among Marty's ethics legislation was the Minnesota law banning lobbyists from giving gifts to public officials. Marty opposes public funding of stadiums and professional sports teams and was outspoken in his criticism of proposals for new stadiums for the Minnesota Twins and Minnesota Vikings. He also supports medical marijuana, and appeared in the movie Super High Me.

Over the years, Marty has pushed for legislation that was initially dismissed as being politically impossible due to opposition of powerful interest groups, eventually building support and passing legislation several years later. He has authored a wide range of laws, including renewable energy legislation that created community solar and multiplied the use of solar power in Minnesota. He also authored the ban on mercury in consumer products, creation of public benefit corporations as an alternative form of business enterprise, authorization for nurses to dispense oral contraceptives in family planning clinics, significant restrictions on special interest money in politics, and numerous DWI and public safety laws.

Marty’s legislative ideas have frequently made Minnesota the first state to adopt such ideas, with other states following suit, such as his law banning smoking in hospitals and health care facilities, and a ban on the pesticide Triclosan and a prohibition on using several toxic flame retardants.

On LGBTQ rights, Marty was pushing for equality in early 1990s amid of strong public support for DOMA. Marty introduced marriage equality legislation in 2008 and publicly said that despite the position's unpopularity, he thought it could pass within five years, which turned out to be true.

== Family and personal life ==
John Marty is married to Connie Marty (née Jaarsma). They live in Roseville, Minnesota, and have two children. He is Lutheran.

== Electoral history ==
- 2022 election for Minnesota Senate – District 40
  - John Marty (Democratic-Farmer-Labor) 26,490 (64.76%)
  - Rachel Japuntich (Republican)
- 2020 election for Minnesota Senate – District 66
  - John Marty (Democratic-Farmer-Labor) 31,880 (76.89%)
  - Greg Copeland (Republican) 9,490 (22.89%)
- 2016 election for Minnesota Senate – District 66
  - John Marty (Democratic-Farmer-Labor) 28,312 (74.34%)
  - Carolyn Jass (Republican) 9,670 votes (25.39%)
- 2012 election for Minnesota Senate – District 66
  - John Marty (Democratic-Farmer-Labor) 27,735 (73.82%)
  - Wayde Brooks (Republican) 9,718 votes (25.87%)
- 2010 election for Minnesota Senate – District 54
  - John Marty (Democratic-Farmer-Labor) 18,600 (56.52%)
  - Tim Johnson (Republican) 14,277 votes (43.38%)
- 2006 election for Minnesota Senate – District 54
  - John Marty (Democratic-Farmer-Labor) 21,847 (62.05%)
  - Dan Williams (Republican) 13,328 votes (37.86%)
- 2002 election for Minnesota Senate – District 54
  - John Marty (Democratic-Farmer-Labor) 21,609 (56.86%)
  - Mark Zasadny (Republican) 16,359 votes (43.04%)
- 2000 election for Minnesota Senate – District 54
  - John Marty (Democratic-Farmer-Labor) 23,614 (65.50%)
  - Mark Zasadny (Republican) 12,440 votes (34.50%)
- 1994 election for Minnesota Governor
  - Arne Carlson (R) (inc.), 63%
  - John Marty (D), 34%
- 1994 election for Minnesota Governor – DFL Primary
  - John Marty, 38%
  - Mike Hatch, 36%
  - Tony Bouza, 25%
  - Richard T. Van Bergen, 1%
- 1992 election for Minnesota Senate – District 54
  - John Marty (DFL), 56%
  - Pat Igo (R), 44%
- 1990 election for Minnesota Senate – District 63
  - John Marty (DFL), 64%
  - Merlyn Scroggins (R), 36%

== Notes ==
Party political offices
Preceded by Rudy Perpich	Democratic nominee for Governor of Minnesota; 1994	Succeeded by Skip Humphrey
