= Mondale (disambiguation) =

Walter Mondale (1928–2021) was an American lawyer and politician who served as the 42nd vice president of the United States.

Mondale is an American surname of Norwegian origin which comes from the farm Mundal by the Norwegian village Fjærland. Other people with the surname include:

- Joan Mondale (1930–2014), wife of Walter Mondale
- Eleanor Mondale (1960–2011), American radio personality and actress, daughter of Walter Mondale
- Ted Mondale (born 1957), American politician and entrepreneur, son of Walter Mondale
- Lester Mondale (1904–2003), American minister, half brother of Walter Mondale

== See also ==
- Mondale High School, school in the Western Cape, South Africa
- Montale (disambiguation)
- Mondal (surname)
