= 1998 Minnesota gubernatorial election =

- November 3, 1998
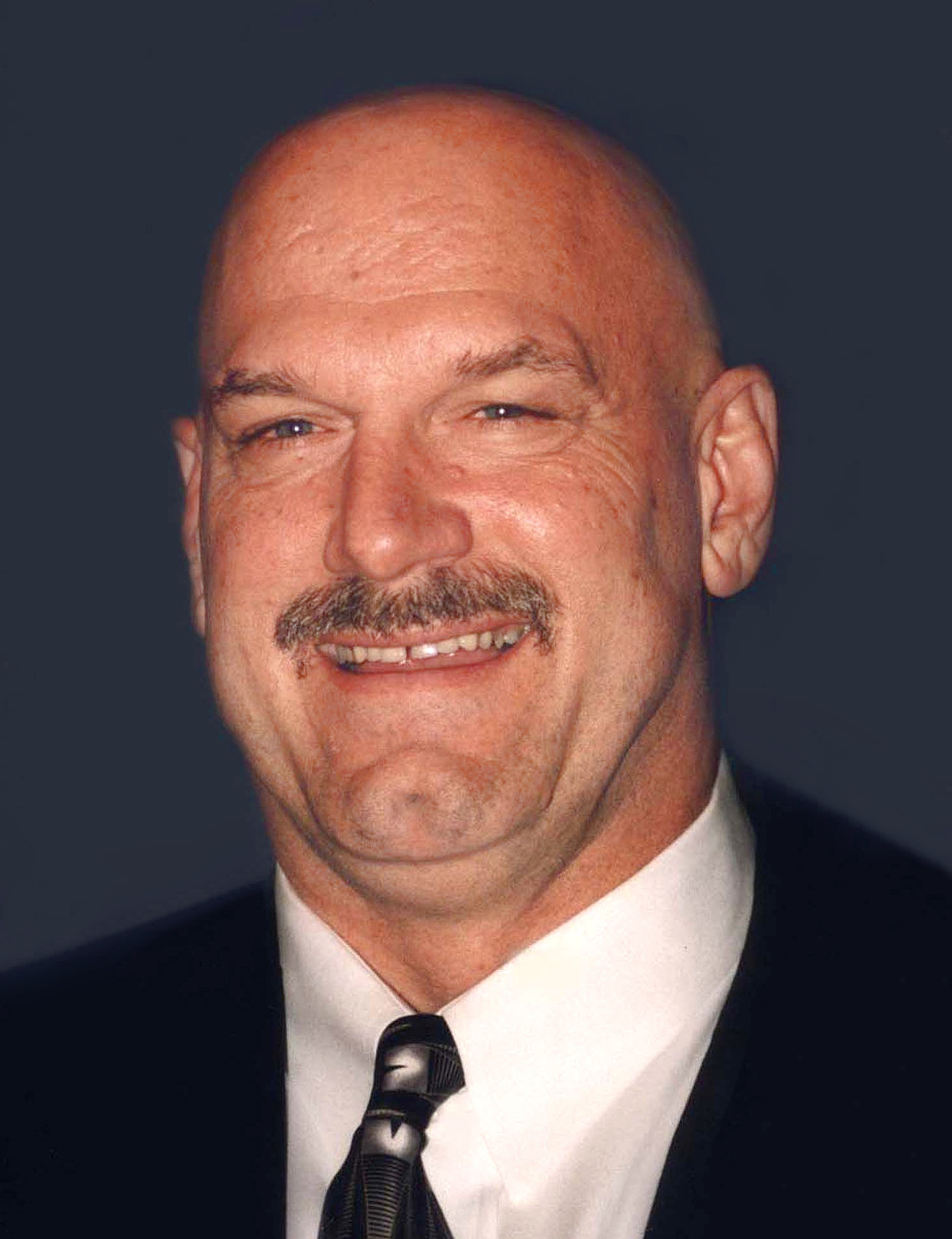

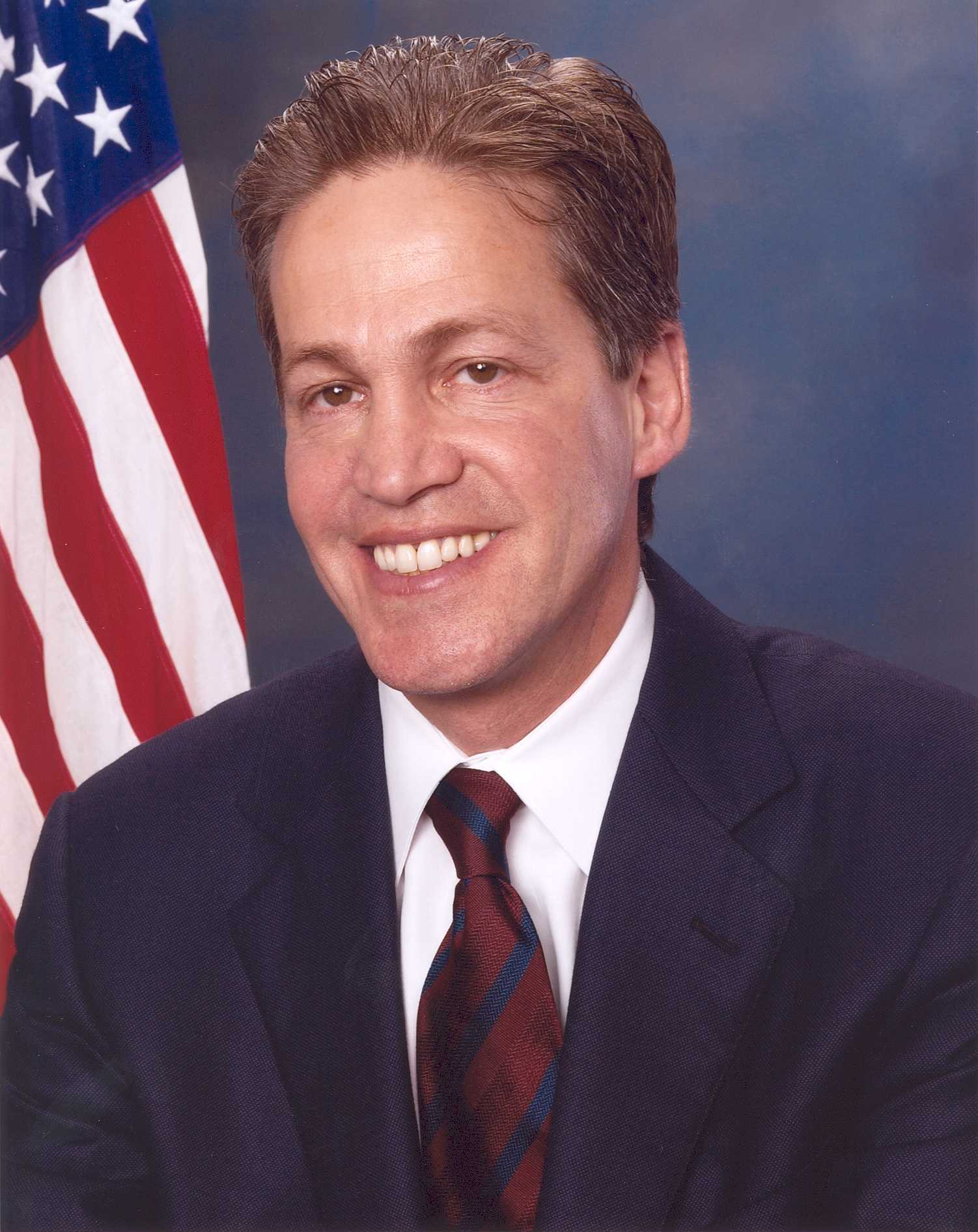

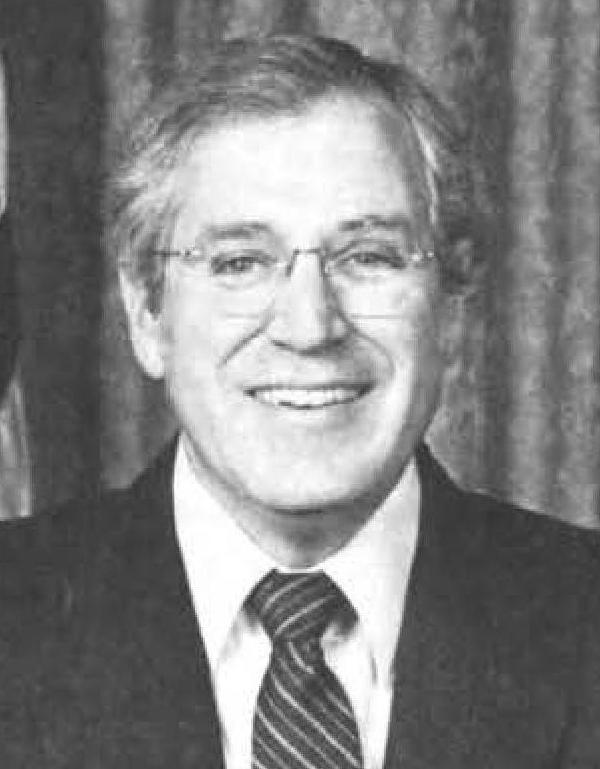
Nominee	Jesse Ventura	Norm Coleman	Skip Humphrey
Party	Reform	Republican	Democratic (DFL)
Running mate	Mae Schunk	Gen Olson	Roger Moe
Popular vote	773,713	717,350	587,528
Percentage	36.99%	34.29%	28.09%
- Ventura: 30–40% 40–50% 50–60% 60–70% 70–80% 80–90% >90% Coleman: 30–40% 40–50% 50–60% 60–70% 70–80% 80–90% >90% Humphrey: 30–40% 40–50% 50–60% 60–70% 70–80% 80–90% >90% Other: 40–50% 60–70% Tie: 30–40% 40–50% 50% No votes
Governor before election
Arne Carlson
Republican
Elected Governor
Jesse Ventura
Reform

The 1998 Minnesota gubernatorial election took place on November 3, 1998. Republican incumbent Arne Carlson was term-limited and constitutionally ineligible to seek a third term in office. Reform Party candidate Jesse Ventura, the former mayor of Brooklyn Park and a former professional wrestler, won office, defeating Republican St. Paul mayor Norm Coleman and DFL state attorney general Skip Humphrey. He succeeded Republican incumbent Arne Carlson. Ventura's victory as a third-party candidate was considered a historic major upset.

As of 2026, the election marks the only time a Reform Party candidate won a major government office. It also remains the last time a third-party candidate won any statewide election in Minnesota. Ventura's vote share of 36.99% is the lowest for a Minnesota gubernatorial election winner since 1890.

== Republican primary ==
=== Candidates ===
==== Nominee ====
- Norm Coleman, mayor of St. Paul
  - Running mate: Gen Olson, state senator from the 34th district

==== Eliminated in primary ====
- Bill Dahn, retired auto mechanic

==== Withdrawn ====
- Joanne Benson, lieutenant governor of Minnesota (endorsed Coleman)
- Dick Borrell, businessman
- Allen Quist, former state representative and 1994 candidate for governor (endorsed Coleman)

=== Polling ===
Poll source	Date(s) administered	Sample size (Note: Key: A – all adults RV – registered voters LV – likely voters V – unclear)	Margin of error	Joanne Benson	Dick Borrell	Norm Coleman	Bill Dahn	Allen Quist	Undecided
Mason-Dixon (Note: Poll commissioned by Minnesota Public Radio, KARE (TV) & the St. Paul Pioneer Press)	August 28–30, 1998	317 (LV)	± 5.8%	–	–	75%	11%	–	14%
Mason-Dixon	May 30 – June 1, 1998	309 (LV)	± 5.7%	20%	2%	39%	–	13%	26%
Mason-Dixon	February 20–22, 1998	319 (LV)	± 5.6%	14%	–	37%	–	11%	34%

=== Results ===
Coleman won the Republican nomination by winning the primary with token opposition.

Republican primary results
Party	Candidate	Votes	%
Republican	Norm Coleman	127,957	91.32%
Republican	Bill Dahn	12,167	8.68%
Total votes		140,124	100.00%

== Democratic–Farmer–Labor primary ==
=== Candidates ===
==== Nominee ====
- Skip Humphrey, Minnesota attorney general and son of former vice president Hubert Humphrey and former U.S. senator Muriel Humphrey
  - Running mate: Roger Moe, Minnesota Senate majority leader from the 2nd district

==== Eliminated in primary ====
- Mark Dayton, Minnesota state auditor and son of businessman Bruce Dayton
  - Running mate: Julie Jansen, day care provider and environmental activist
- Mike Freeman, Hennepin County attorney and son of former Governor Orville Freeman
  - Running mate: Ruth Johnson, state representative (HD24B)
- Doug Johnson, state senator (SD6) from the Iron Range and Chair of the Senate Committee on Taxation
  - Running mate: Tom Foley, former Ramsey County attorney and Washington County attorney
- Ted Mondale, former state senator from the 44th district and son of former vice president Walter Mondale
  - Running mate: Deanna Winter, political reporter
- Ole Savior, perennial candidate
  - Running mate: Ron Moseng

=== Polling ===
Poll source	Date(s) administered	Sample size	Margin of error	Mark Dayton	Mike Freeman	Skip Humphrey	Doug Johnson	John Marty	Ted Mondale	Undecided
Mason-Dixon	August 28–30, 1998	317 (LV)	± 5.6%	23%	10%	38%	4%	–	10%	15%
Mason-Dixon	May 30 – June 1, 1998	326 (LV)	± 5.5%	10%	13%	32%	4%	3%	12%	26%
Mason-Dixon	February 20–22, 1998	319 (LV)	± 5.6%	7%	9%	35%	6%	5%	11%	26%

=== Debate ===
1998 Minnesota gubernatorial election Democratic primary debate
No.	Date	Host	Moderator	Link	Democratic	Democratic	Democratic	Democratic	Democratic
Key: P Participant A Absent N Not invited I Invited W Withdrawn									
Key: P Participant A Absent N Not invited I Invited W Withdrawn					Mark Dayton	Mike Freeman	Skip Humphrey	Doug Johnson	Ted Mondale
1		Minnesota Public Radio	Gary Eichten	MPR (audio only)	P	P	P	P	P

=== Results ===
Democratic–Farmer–Labor primary results
Party	Candidate	Votes	%
Democratic (DFL)	Skip Humphrey	182,562	36.95%
Democratic (DFL)	Mike Freeman	93,714	18.97%
Democratic (DFL)	Doug Johnson	91,888	18.60%
Democratic (DFL)	Mark Dayton	88,070	17.83%
Democratic (DFL)	Ted Mondale	36,237	7.33%
Democratic (DFL)	Ole Savior	1,598	0.32%
Total votes		494,069	100.0%

== General election ==
=== Candidates ===
- Norm Coleman, mayor of St. Paul (Republican)
  - Running mate: Gen Olson, state senator (Rep-SD34)
- Thomas Fiske (Socialist Workers)
- Frank Germann (Libertarian)
- Skip Humphrey, attorney general of Minnesota and son of former Vice President Hubert Humphrey and former U.S. Senator Muriel Humphrey (DFL)
  - Running mate: Roger Moe, Minnesota Senate majority leader (SD2)
- "Fancy" Ray McCloney ("People's Champion")
- Ken Pentel (Green)
- Jesse Ventura, former mayor of Brooklyn Park and professional wrestler (Reform)
  - Running mate: Mae Schunk, Inver Grove Heights teacher
- Chris Wright (Grassroots)

Ventura ran unopposed in his party's primary.

=== Campaign ===
Humphrey was seen as the initial favorite, having scored a $6 billion settlement with the tobacco industry in May of that year. The DFL primary saw candidates mostly focusing on issues, rather than attacking Humphrey. Humphrey had nearly lost the party's endorsement to Mike Freeman. The convention deadlock was broken when the labor caucus led by MAPE delegate David Schmidt, endorsed Skip Humphrey pushing him over the top. The primary was nicknamed the "My Three Sons" campaign, owing to the political pedigree of three of the candidates, Freeman, Mondale and Humphrey. and Mark Dayton, heir to the Dayton fortune. Humphrey was endorsed by the Star Tribune in the run up to November.

Coleman started as a strong challenger to Humphrey. Coleman received the Republican endorsement over more conservative candidates Allen Quist and Joanne Benson. Coleman ran as a social conservative, opposing abortion and gay marriage. He also campaigned on using the state's budget surplus to cut taxes, as well as expanding the state's school choice program to include school vouchers.

Ventura spent around $300,000 and combined it with an aggressive grassroots campaign that featured a statewide bus tour, pioneered use of the Internet for political purposes, and aired quirky TV ads designed by Bill Hillsman, who forged the phrase "Don't vote for politics as usual." Unable to afford many television ads, Ventura mainly focused on televised debates and public appearances, preaching his brand of libertarian politics. His speech at a parade in rural Minnesota during the summer attracted what organizers of the annual event described as one of its largest audiences. He ran on cutting taxes, reducing state government, and reducing public school classroom sizes to a 17 to 1 ratio. He also supported a public debate on the viability of legalized prostitution.

=== Polling ===
A poll taken in June showed that Coleman would defeat any other Democratic candidate than Humphrey; Humphrey would defeat Coleman 44% to 34%. However, Ventura polled in the double digits. No other candidate in the Reform Party's brief history in Minnesota has received more than 5 percent of the votes in a statewide election. Following the primary election in September, a poll on October 20 showed Humphrey leading 35% to Coleman (34%) and Ventura (21%). But the Star Tribune poll suggested that Ventura's surge with the voters had come mostly at Humphrey's expense. Since the primary, Humphrey's support among likely voters had dropped by 14 percentage points, while Coleman's had increased by 5 percentage points.

Poll source	Date(s) administered	Sample size	Margin of error	Jesse Ventura (Rf)	Norm Coleman (R)	Skip Humphrey (D)	Undecided
Market Solutions Group (Note: Poll sponsored by KMSP-TV & the Minnesota Star Tribune)	October 27–30, 1998	1,007 (A)	± 3.0%	27%	30%	35%	8%
Mason-Dixon Polling & Strategy	October 23–25, 1998	816 (RV)	± 3.5%	23%	33%	34%	10%
Market Solutions Group	October 15–18, 1998	806 (LV)	± 3.5%	21%	34%	35%	10%
Mason-Dixon Polling & Strategy	October 10–13, 1998	825 (RV)	± 3.5%	15%	31%	44%	10%
Mason-Dixon Polling & Strategy	August 28–30, 1998	812 (RV)	± 3.5%	13%	29%	43%	15%
Mason-Dixon Polling & Strategy	May 30 – June 1, 1998	806 (RV)	± 3.5%	7%	30%	46%	17%

Hypothetical polling

Coleman vs. Humphrey

Poll source	Date(s) administered	Sample size	Margin of error	Norm Coleman (R)	Skip Humphrey (D)	Undecided
Mason-Dixon	October 23–25, 1998	816 (RV)	± 3.5%	42%	41%	17%
Mason-Dixon	October 10–13, 1998	825 (LV)	± 3.5%	31%	44%	25%
Minnesota Star Tribune	September 16–20, 1998	1,009 (A)	± 4.3%	29%	49%	22%
Mason-Dixon	August 28–30, 1998	812 (LV)	± 3.5%	29%	43%	28%
Minnesota Star Tribune	July 23–28, 1998	1,007 (LV)	± 3.0%	35%	39%	26%
Mason-Dixon	May 30 – June 1, 1998	806 (LV)	± 3.5%	30%	46%	24%
Mason-Dixon	February 20–22, 1998	827 (RV)	± 3.5%	33%	39%	28%

Ventura vs. Coleman vs. Dayton

Poll source	Date(s) administered	Sample size	Margin of error	Jesse Ventura (Rf)	Norm Coleman (R)	Mark Dayton (D)	Undecided
Mason-Dixon	August 28–30, 1998	812 (RV)	± 3.5%	12%	34%	35%	19%

Ventura vs. Coleman vs. Freeman

Poll source	Date(s) administered	Sample size	Margin of error	Jesse Ventura (Rf)	Norm Coleman (R)	Mike Freeman (D)	Undecided
Mason-Dixon	August 28–30, 1998	812 (RV)	± 3.5%	12%	36%	32%	20%
Mason-Dixon	May 30 – June 1, 1998	806 (RV)	± 3.5%	13%	30%	39%	18%

Ventura vs. Coleman vs. Johnson

Poll source	Date(s) administered	Sample size	Margin of error	Jesse Ventura (Rf)	Norm Coleman (R)	Doug Johnson (D)	Undecided
Mason-Dixon	August 28–30, 1998	812 (RV)	± 3.5%	8%	40%	25%	27%

Ventura vs. Coleman vs. Mondale

Poll source	Date(s) administered	Sample size	Margin of error	Jesse Ventura (Rf)	Norm Coleman (R)	Ted Mondale (D)	Undecided
Mason-Dixon	August 28–30, 1998	812 (RV)	± 3.5%	11%	32%	35%	21%
Mason-Dixon	May 30 – June 1, 1998	806 (RV)	± 3.5%	11%	36%	37%	16%

Ventura vs. Benson vs. Freeman

Poll source	Date(s) administered	Sample size	Margin of error	Jesse Ventura (Rf)	Joanne Benson (R)	Mike Freeman (D)	Undecided
Mason-Dixon	May 30 – June 1, 1998	806 (RV)	± 3.5%	13%	28%	35%	24%

Ventura vs. Benson vs. Humphrey

Poll source	Date(s) administered	Sample size	Margin of error	Jesse Ventura (Rf)	Joanne Benson (R)	Skip Humphrey (D)	Undecided
Mason-Dixon	May 30 – June 1, 1998	806 (RV)	± 3.5%	10%	20%	55%	15%

Ventura vs. Benson vs. Mondale

Poll source	Date(s) administered	Sample size	Margin of error	Jesse Ventura (Rf)	Joanne Benson (R)	Ted Mondale (D)	Undecided
Mason-Dixon	May 30 – June 1, 1998	806 (RV)	± 3.5%	11%	24%	45%	20%

Ventura vs. Quist vs. Freeman

Poll source	Date(s) administered	Sample size	Margin of error	Jesse Ventura (Rf)	Allen Quist (R)	Mike Freeman (D)	Undecided
Mason-Dixon	May 30 – June 1, 1998	806 (RV)	± 3.5%	14%	19%	36%	31%

Ventura vs. Quist vs. Humphrey

Poll source	Date(s) administered	Sample size	Margin of error	Jesse Ventura (Rf)	Allen Quist (R)	Skip Humphrey (D)	Undecided
Mason-Dixon	May 30 – June 1, 1998	806 (RV)	± 3.5%	12%	17%	56%	15%

Ventura vs. Quist vs. Mondale

Poll source	Date(s) administered	Sample size	Margin of error	Jesse Ventura (Rf)	Allen Quist (R)	Ted Mondale (D)	Undecided
Mason-Dixon	May 30 – June 1, 1998	806 (RV)	± 3.5%	12%	18%	51%	19%

Coleman vs. Freeman

Poll source	Date(s) administered	Sample size	Margin of error	Norm Coleman (R)	Mike Freeman (D)	Undecided
Mason-Dixon	February 20–22, 1998	827 (RV)	± 3.5%	36%	29%	35%

Coleman vs. Mondale

Poll source	Date(s) administered	Sample size	Margin of error	Norm Coleman (R)	Ted Mondale (D)	Undecided
Mason-Dixon	February 20–22, 1998	827 (RV)	± 3.5%	34%	33%	33%

Benson vs. Freeman

Poll source	Date(s) administered	Sample size	Margin of error	Joanne Benson (R)	Mike Freeman (D)	Undecided
Mason-Dixon	February 20–22, 1998	827 (RV)	± 3.5%	27%	30%	43%

Benson vs. Humphrey

Poll source	Date(s) administered	Sample size	Margin of error	Joanne Benson (R)	Skip Humphrey (D)	Undecided
Mason-Dixon	February 20–22, 1998	827 (RV)	± 3.5%	25%	49%	26%

Benson vs. Mondale

Poll source	Date(s) administered	Sample size	Margin of error	Joanne Benson (R)	Ted Mondale (D)	Undecided
Mason-Dixon	February 20–22, 1998	827 (RV)	± 3.5%	26%	37%	37%

=== Debate ===
1998 Minnesota gubernatorial election debates
No.	Date	Host	Moderator	Link	Reform	Republican	Democratic
Key: P Participant A Absent N Not invited I Invited W Withdrawn							
Key: P Participant A Absent N Not invited I Invited W Withdrawn					Jesse Ventura	Norm Coleman	Skip Humphrey
1	Oct. 1, 1998	League of Women Voters	Judy Duffy	C-SPAN	P	P	P
2	Oct. 16, 1998	League of Women Voters	Catherine Severin	C-SPAN	P	P	P
3	Oct. 24, 1998	KARE (TV), KMSP-TV, KSTP-TV & KTCA	Ken Stone	Twin Cities PBS	P	P	P
4	Oct. 30, 1998	Insight News, KMOJ, KTCA-TV, MPR & Star Tribune	Karen Louise Boothe; Lori Sturdevant	C-SPAN	P	P	P

=== Results ===
County flips: Democratic Hold Flip / Republican Hold / Reform Flip

1998 Minnesota gubernatorial election
Party	Candidate	Votes	%	±%
Reform	Jesse Ventura	773,713	36.99%	New
Republican	Norm Coleman	717,350	34.29%	−29.04%
Democratic (DFL)	Skip Humphrey	587,528	28.09%	−6.02%
Green	Ken Pentel	7,034	0.34%	n/a
Libertarian	Frank Germann	1,932	0.09%	−0.80%
Grassroots	Chris Wright	1,727	0.08%	−1.12%
People's Champion	Fancy Ray McCloney	919	0.04%	n/a
Socialist Workers	Thomas Fiske	787	0.04%	−0.14%
	Write-ins	776		n/a
Majority		56,363	2.69%	
Turnout		2,091,766	60%	
Reform gain from Republican		Swing		

==== By county ====
County	Coleman	Votes	Humphrey	Votes	Ventura	Votes	Others	Votes
Aitkin	31.6%	2,447	30.3%	2,347	37.4%	2,897	0.6%	47
Anoka	29.3%	37,111	19.7%	24,975	50.7%	64,100	0.3%	363
Becker	41.4%	5,030	35.7%	4,349	22.4%	2,721	0.5%	62
Beltrami	39.8%	5,872	35.9%	5,289	23.0%	3,387	1.3%	195
Benton	33.2%	4,388	20.8%	2,750	45.6%	6,027	0.4%	47
Big Stone	31.9%	912	40.0%	1,144	27.5%	786	0.5%	15
Blue Earth	30.9%	7,031	24.9%	5,666	43.8%	9,973	0.6%	111
Brown	45.2%	5,150	21.2%	2,417	33.3%	3,794	0.4%	44
Carlton	31.0%	3,929	42.9%	5,439	25.5%	3,226	0.6%	70
Carver	39.9%	11,479	16.1%	4,621	43.8%	12,606	0.3%	88
Cass	42.0%	4,781	28.9%	3,288	28.7%	3,268	0.5%	55
Chippewa	28.3%	1,721	34.0%	2,064	37.4%	2,271	0.3%	19
Chisago	28.0%	5,376	18.9%	3,621	52.8%	10,138	0.4%	71
Clay	34.7%	6,200	43.5%	7,766	21.8%	3,797	0.5%	91
Clearwater	44.8%	1,439	35.0%	1,124	19.5%	625	0.7%	24
Cook	38.6%	1,010	39.6%	1,046	18.0%	474	3.8%	100
Cottonwood	39.6%	2,420	30.8%	1,884	29.2%	1,788	0.5%	29
Crow Wing	39.7%	9,559	26.0%	6,257	33.9%	8,162	0.4%	104
Dakota	37.3%	56,242	22.0%	33,253	40.4%	60,909	0.3%	484
Dodge	37.4%	2,619	21.2%	1,484	41.0%	2,867	0.4%	27
Douglas	42.1%	6,323	23.3%	3,503	34.3%	5,162	0.3%	41
Faribault	34.2%	2,778	29.3%	2,382	36.0%	2,923	0.4%	34
Fillmore	39.7%	3,359	33.4%	2,823	26.2%	2,219	0.7%	56
Freeborn	39.5%	5,463	33.3%	4,605	26.9%	3,706	0.5%	65
Goodhue	33.9%	6,786	22.7%	4,547	43.0%	8,610	0.5%	92
Grant	30.6%	1,055	31.6%	1,089	37.5%	1,294	0.3%	10
Hennepin	31.9%	155,311	30.2%	147,059	36.9%	179,954	1.0%	4,778
Houston	48.8%	3,616	37.7%	2,797	12.0%	891	1.5%	111
Hubbard	42.6%	3,697	30.1%	2,609	26.7%	2,317	0.7%	57
Isanti	27.3%	3,719	19.6%	2,665	52.9%	7,209	0.3%	36
Itasca	37.8%	7,181	41.6%	7,911	19.8%	3,768	0.8%	143
Jackson	34.9%	1,796	33.5%	1,728	31.1%	1,605	0.5%	24
Kanabec	29.0%	1,895	21.1%	1,374	49.6%	3,238	0.3%	17
Kandiyohi	34.5%	6,287	29.3%	5,337	35.9%	6,530	0.2%	45
Kittson	32.2%	757	50.3%	1,185	16.5%	389	1.0%	23
Koochiching	46.4%	2,721	34.9%	2,347	18.1%	1,064	0.56%	31
Lac Qui	27.6%	1,133	39.5%	1,621	32.4%	1,330	0.4%	16
Lake	30.1%	1,766	42.2%	2,472	26.4%	1,545	1.3%	75
Lake of the Woods	41.5%	837	42.2%	852	14.3%	288	2.1%	41
Le Sueur	30.4%	3,582	22.2%	2,614	47.1%	5,551	0.3%	35
Lincoln	36.4%	1,129	36.7%	1,136	26.3%	815	0.6%	18
Lyon	39.1%	4,043	28.7%	2,966	31.7%	3,277	0.6%	66
McLeod	30.9%	4,754	15.9%	2,449	52.8%	8,126	0.3%	50
Mahnomen	41.8%	821	36.5%	716	20.7%	406	1.1%	21
Marshall	40.5%	1,959	41.5%	2,008	17.2%	834	0.8%	38
Martin	38.8%	3,676	26.7%	2,534	34.2%	3,243	0.2%	23
Meeker	31.3%	3,320	19.7%	2,083	48.6%	5,153	0.4%	39
Mille Lacs	31.0%	2,898	21.4%	1,998	47.2%	4,404	0.4%	39
Morrison	40.6%	5,377	21.9%	2,899	37.0%	4,905	0.6%	78
Mower	34.9%	5,529	39.3%	6,234	25.2%	3,990	0.7%	111
Murray	38.7%	1,819	34.5%	1,620	26.2%	1,233	0.6%	30
Nicollet	33.2%	4,345	25.9%	3,384	40.3%	5,272	0.6%	78
Nobles	39.0%	3,265	31.8%	2,664	28.7%	2,404	0.4%	34
Norman	31.4%	1,024	49.7%	1,621	18.3%	596	0.6%	19
Olmsted	42.7%	19,480	26.8%	12,205	30.1%	13,710	0.4%	199
Otter Tail	45.0%	10,785	29.1%	6,982	25.3%	6,069	0.5%	116
Pennington	38.8%	2,226	39.3%	2,253	21.4%	1,226	0.6%	35
Pine	26.9%	2,869	25.6%	2,730	47.1%	5,027	0.4%	48
Pipestone	46.8%	2,127	35.7%	1,621	16.6%	752	0.9%	43
Polk	40.7%	2,347	43.5%	4,462	15.5%	1,699	0.4%	44
Pope	33.6%	1,954	32.9%	1,738	36.1%	2,099	0.3%	17
Ramsey	32.4%	69,240	32.1%	68,619	34.6%	73,993	0.8%	1,714
Red Lake	39.6%	842	43.3%	920	16.0%	339	1.1%	24
Redwood	42.8%	3,140	22.5%	1,654	34.5%	2,533	0.2%	17
Renville	30.7%	2,514	25.4%	2,079	43.7%	3,583	0.3%	24
Rice	29.7%	6,732	28.5%	6,518	41.3%	9,444	0.7%	170
Rock	47.7%	1,832	36.1%	1,384	15.5%	596	0.7%	25
Roseau	49.8%	2,975	31.2%	1,863	18.1%	1,081	1.0%	57
St. Louis	28.1%	24,439	47.3%	41,208	23.8%	20,682	0.8%	17
Scott	34.9%	12,075	16.7%	5,787	48.1%	16,612	0.3%	97
Sherburne	32.1%	8,139	16.4%	4,163	51.2%	13,004	0.3%	73
Sibley	32.1%	2,261	17.9%	1,262	49.7%	3,497	0.3%	24
Stearns	38.5%	20,731	21.7%	11,696	39.2%	21,116	0.6%	320
Steele	38.5%	5,399	21.6%	3,022	39.7%	5,559	0.3%	37
Stevens	40.7%	2,052	29.9%	1,507	28.9%	1,455	0.5%	25
Swift	26.7%	1,410	35.1%	1,852	38.0%	2,006	0.2%	11
Todd	39.3%	4,293	22.4%	2,426	37.9%	4,146	0.5%	60
Traverse	34.2%	733	33.7%	721	31.5%	674	0.7%	14
Wabasha	35.8%	3,363	23.6%	2,221	40.2%	3,776	0.4%	41
Wadena	43.1%	2,563	25.9%	1,537	30.3%	1,782	1.1%	63
Waseca	35.8%	3,064	22.3%	1,904	41.4%	3,543	0.5%	42
Washington	35.8%	32,565	22.2%	20,205	41.7%	37,910	0.3%	300
Watonwan	33.4%	1,711	27.9%	1,429	38.3%	1,965	0.4%	19
Wilkin	43.2%	1,181	32.6%	892	23.4%	639	0.8%	22
Winona	42.9%	7,856	33.7%	6,176	22.1%	4,039	1.3%	235
Wright	32.1%	11,957	16.2%	6,027	51.4%	19,124	0.3%	106
Yellow Medicine	29.8%	1,628	33.7%	1,838	36.0%	1,966	0.5%	25
Totals	34.29%	717,350	28.09%	587,528	36.99%	773,713	0.63%	13,175

Counties that flipped from Republican to Reform

- Benton
- Blue Earth
- Chisago
- Scott
- Dakota
- Goodhue
- Grant
- Isanti
- Kanabec
- Kandiyohi
- Le Sueur
- McLeod
- Meeker
- Mille Lacs
- Nicollet
- Pope
- Renville
- Sherburne
- Sibley
- Stearns
- Steele
- Wabasha
- Washington
- Watonwan
- Wright
- Aitkin
- Pine
- Rice
- Anoka
- Carver
- Yellow Medicine
- Chippewa
- Hennepin
- Ramsey
- Swift
- Faribault
- Waseca
- Dodge

Counties that flipped from Republican to Democratic

- Big Stone
- Cook
- Clay
- Itasca
- Kittson
- Lac qui Parle
- Lake of the Woods
- Lincoln
- Marshall
- Mower
- Norman
- Pennington
- Polk
- Red Lake

== Notes ==
Partisan clients
