= Skip Humphrey =

American retired politician (born 1942)

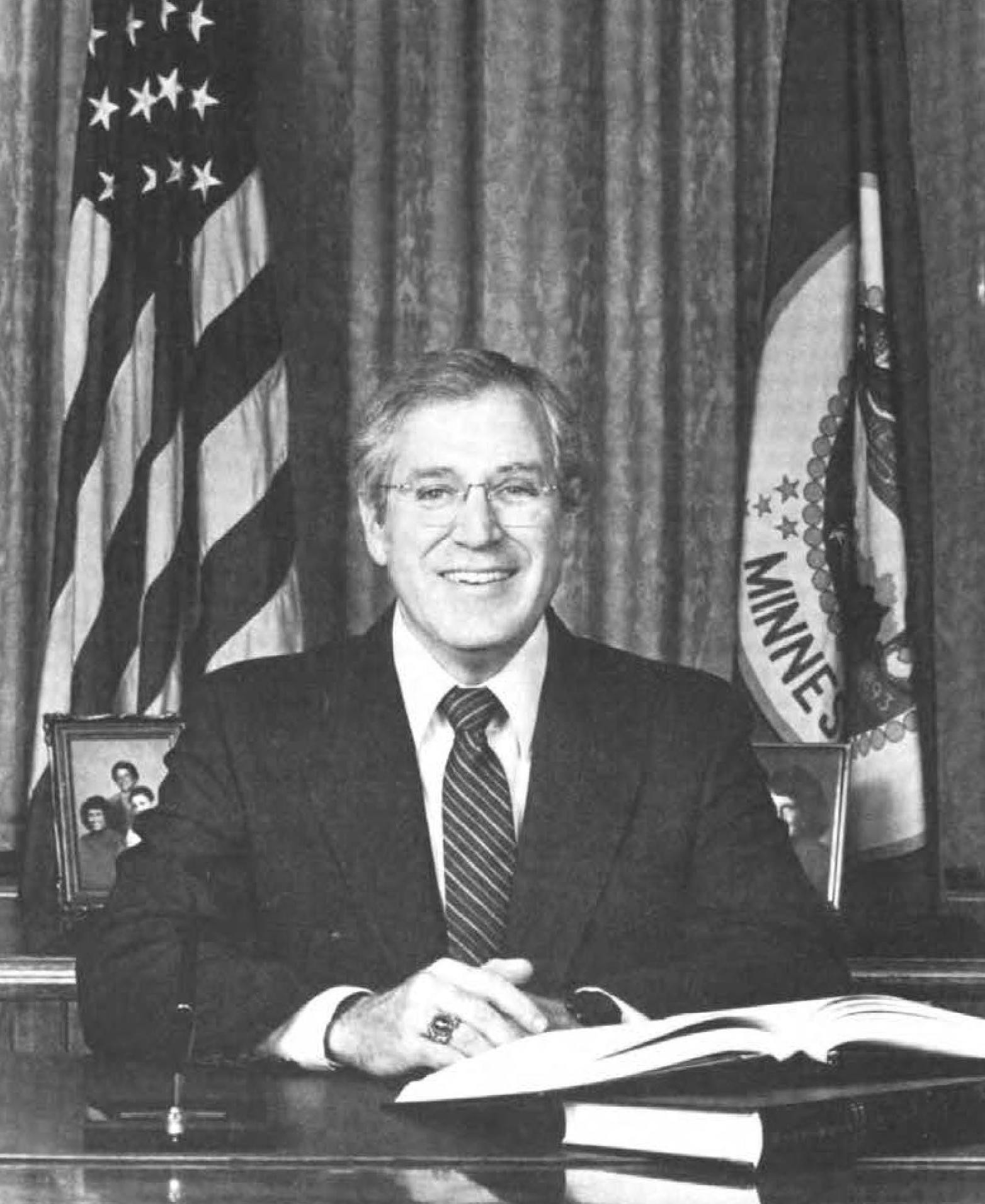
- Humphrey in 1985

27th Attorney General of Minnesota
- In office January 3, 1983 – January 4, 1999
- Governor: Rudy Perpich; Arne Carlson
- Preceded by: Warren Spannaus
- Succeeded by: Mike Hatch

Member of the Minnesota Senate from the 44th district
- In office January 2, 1973 – January 3, 1983
- Preceded by: John C. Chenoweth
- Succeeded by: Phyllis W. McQuaid

Personal details
- Born: Hubert Horatio Humphrey III; June 26, 1942 (age 84) Minneapolis, Minnesota, U.S.
- Party: Democratic
- Spouse: Nancy Jeffery (m. 1963)
- Children: 3, including Buck
- Parent(s): Hubert Humphrey; Muriel Humphrey
- Education: American University (BA); University of Minnesota (JD)

Hubert Horatio "Skip" Humphrey III (born June 26, 1942) is an American retired politician who served from 1983 to 1999 as Minnesota Attorney General and from 1973 to 1983 as a member of the Minnesota Senate. Humphrey led the Office of Older Americans as the assistant director at the Consumer Financial Protection Bureau (CFPB).

A member of the Minnesota Democratic–Farmer–Labor Party, Humphrey is a son of Vice President Hubert Humphrey and U.S. Senator Muriel Humphrey. He was the Democratic nominee in the hotly contested 1998 Minnesota gubernatorial election.

== Early life ==
Hubert Horatio Humphrey III was born on June 26, 1942, in Minneapolis, Minnesota. Humphrey graduated from American University, where he was a member of Alpha Sigma Phi, Beta Chi chapter, and is a graduate of the University of Minnesota Law School.

== Political career ==
Humphrey was elected to the Minnesota Senate in 1972 and served as a state senator from 1973 to 1983. He was elected Minnesota Attorney General in 1982, one of the DFL Party's most popular candidates ever in terms of popular vote. He served in the office for four consecutive terms, from 1983 to 1999.

On January 13, 1978, his father died of bladder cancer at the age of 66.

In 1988, he ran for the same U.S. Senate seat that his father and his mother previously held, but was defeated by incumbent Independent-Republican Senator David Durenberger. After this loss he served as president of the National Association of Attorneys General, and in 1996 he was state chair of President Bill Clinton's reelection campaign.

By 1998, he was again encouraged to run for higher office, and entered the DFL gubernatorial primary, winning handily in a crowded field (which included another scion of an eminent Minnesota political family, Ted Mondale). In the general election, both Humphrey and Republican candidate Norm Coleman lost to the third-party candidacy of Jesse Ventura in a tumultuous race. On September 20, his mother died at the age of 86.

== Political legacy ==
Humphrey was an enthusiastic successor of his father's New Deal-inspired political philosophy, and throughout his career he remained devoted to traditional progressive ideals as well as their more modern manifestations: "If you think that being too liberal means raising the minimum wage, advocating health care for everyone, protecting the environment, taking on the tobacco industry, enacting campaign finance reform, and putting more cops on the streets, then guess what? That's what Minnesotans want." One of his most passionately held principles was his opposition to tobacco and its powerful political lobby: in 1999, the World Health Organization awarded him the Director-General's Prize for outstanding global contribution to tobacco control.

== Personal life ==
While a student at American University, Humphrey met Nancy Lee Jeffery, the daughter of a U.S. Navy captain. The two were married while spending the summer of 1963 in Europe. The Humphreys are the parents of three children, including Hubert H. "Buck" Humphrey IV, who ran for Minnesota Secretary of State in 2002, losing by three percentage points to Republican nominee Mary Kiffmeyer.

Humphrey was a senior fellow at the University of Minnesota, where he taught public health policy and law, and was also Senior Vice President at Tunheim Partners, a Minnesota-based communications and public affairs firm. Beginning in 2004, Humphrey served as the president of the Minnesota chapter of the American Association of Retired Persons (AARP), and later was a member of the Board of Directors of the National AARP. In October 2011, Humphrey was appointed the assistant director of the Office of Older Americans at the Consumer Financial Protection Bureau.

== Electoral history ==
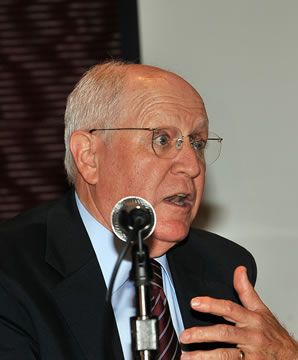
Humphrey in 2012

=== 1972 ===
1972 Primary Election for Minnesota State Senator, District 44
Party	Candidate	Votes	%
Nonpartisan	Don Forseth	1,956	52.34%
Nonpartisan	Skip Humphrey	1,637	43.81%
Nonpartisan	Betty A. Harasyn	144	3.85%
Total votes		3,737	100%

1972 General Election for Minnesota State Senator, District 44
Party	Candidate	Votes	%
Nonpartisan	Skip Humphrey	12,538	54.75%
Nonpartisan	Don Forseth	10,361	45.25%
Total votes		22,899	100%

=== 1976 ===
1976 General Election for Minnesota State Senator, District 44
Party	Candidate	Votes	%
Democratic (DFL)	Skip Humphrey (incumbent)	15,890	68.62%
Republican	Rick Sathre	7,268	31.38%
Total votes		23,158	100%

=== 1980 ===
1980 DFL Primary Election for Minnesota State Senator, District 44
Party	Candidate	Votes	%
Democratic (DFL)	Skip Humphrey (incumbent)	655	100%
Total votes		655	100%

1980 General Election for Minnesota State Senator, District 44
Party	Candidate	Votes	%
Democratic (DFL)	Skip Humphrey (incumbent)	19,579	100%
Total votes		19,579	100%

=== 1982 ===
1982 DFL Primary Election for Minnesota Attorney General
Party	Candidate	Votes	%
Democratic (DFL)	Skip Humphrey	473,950	100%
Total votes		473,950	100%

1982 General Election for Minnesota Attorney General
Party	Candidate	Votes	%
Democratic (DFL)	Skip Humphrey	1,082,539	61.72%
Republican	Elliot Rothenberg	653,162	37.24%
Conservative People's	Samuel Faulk	18,278	1.04%
Total votes		1,753,979	100%

=== 1986 ===
1986 DFL Primary Election for Minnesota Attorney General
Party	Candidate	Votes	%
Democratic (DFL)	Skip Humphrey (incumbent)	406,487	85.67%
Democratic (DFL)	Wendy Alison Nora	27,544	5.81%
Democratic (DFL)	Richard Bullock	24,151	5.09%
Democratic (DFL)	Samuel Faulk	16,271	3.43%
Total votes		474,453	100%

1986 General Election for Minnesota Attorney General
Party	Candidate	Votes	%
Democratic (DFL)	Skip Humphrey (incumbent)	985,569	70.32%
Republican	Lew Freeman	399,483	28.51%
Green	Derrick Grimmer	16,394	1.17%
Total votes		1,401,446	100%

=== 1988 ===
1988 DFL Primary Election for US Senator
Party	Candidate	Votes	%
Democratic (DFL)	Skip Humphrey	153,808	90.58%
Democratic (DFL)	Kent Herschbach	15,994	9.42%
Total votes		169,802	100%

1988 General Election for US Senator
Party	Candidate	Votes	%
Republican	David Durenberger	1,176,210	56.18%
Democratic (DFL)	Skip Humphrey	856,694	40.92%
Progressive Issues Party	Polly Mann	44,474	2.12%
Green	Derrick Grimmer	9,016	0.43%
Libertarian	Arlen Overvig	4,039	0.19%
Socialist Workers	Wendy Lyons	3,105	0.15%
Total votes		2,093,538	100%

=== 1990 ===
1990 DFL Primary Election for Minnesota Attorney General
Party	Candidate	Votes	%
Democratic (DFL)	Skip Humphrey (incumbent)	335,339	100%
Total votes		335,339	100%

1990 General Election for Minnesota Attorney General
Party	Candidate	Votes	%
Democratic (DFL)	Skip Humphrey (incumbent)	1,126,447	63.22%
Republican	Kevin Johnson	655,282	36.78%
Total votes		1,781,729	100%

=== 1994 ===
1994 DFL Primary Election for Minnesota Attorney General
Party	Candidate	Votes	%
Democratic (DFL)	Skip Humphrey (incumbent)	329,417	87.92%
Democratic (DFL)	Kent Herschbach	24,590	6.56%
Democratic (DFL)	Lewis Smith	20,668	5.52%
Total votes		374,675	100%

1994 General Election for Minnesota Attorney General
Party	Candidate	Votes	%
Democratic (DFL)	Skip Humphrey (incumbent)	1,115,285	66.63%
Republican	Sharon Anderson	488,753	29.20%
Grassroots	Dean Anumdson	69,776	4.17%
Total votes		1,673,814	100%

=== 1998 ===
1998 DFL Primary Election for Minnesota Governor and Lieutenant Governor
Party	Candidate	Votes	%
Democratic (DFL)	Skip Humphrey and Roger Moe	182,562	36.95%
Democratic (DFL)	Mike Freeman and Ruth Johnson	93,714	18.97%
Democratic (DFL)	Doug Johnson and Tom Foley	91,888	18.60%
Democratic (DFL)	Mark Dayton and Julie Jansen	88,070	17.83%
Democratic (DFL)	Ted Mondale and Deanna Weiner	36,237	7.33%
Democratic (DFL)	Ole' Savior and Ron Moseng	1,598	0.32%
Total votes		494,069	100%

1998 General Election for Minnesota Governor and Lieutenant Governor
Party	Candidate	Votes	%
Reform	Jesse Ventura and Mae Schunk	773,403	37.00%
Republican	Norm Coleman and Gen Olson	716,880	34.29%
Democratic (DFL)	Skip Humphrey and Roger Moe	587,060	28.08%
Green	Ken Pentel and Susan Jasper	7,034	0.34%
Libertarian	Frank Germann and Michael C. Strand	1,932	0.09%
Grassroots	Chris Wright and D.G. Paulson	1,727	0.08%
People's Champion	Fancy Ray McCloney and Toni McCloney	919	0.04%
Socialist Workers	Thomas Fiske and John Hawkins	787	0.04%
Write-in		776	0.04%
Total votes		2,090,518	100%

Legal offices
Preceded by Warren Spannaus	Attorney General of Minnesota; 1983–1999	Succeeded by Mike Hatch
Party political offices
Preceded by Warren Spannaus	Democratic nominee for Attorney General of Minnesota; 1982, 1986, 1990, 1994	Succeeded by Mike Hatch
Preceded by Mark Dayton	Democratic nominee for U.S. Senator from Minnesota (Class 1); 1988	Succeeded by Ann Wynia
Preceded by John Marty	Democratic nominee for Governor of Minnesota; 1998	Succeeded by Roger Moe
