= Mae Schunk =

American politician (born 1934)

45th Lieutenant Governor of Minnesota
- In office January 4, 1999 – January 6, 2003
- Governor: Jesse Ventura
- Preceded by: Joanne Benson
- Succeeded by: Carol Molnau

Personal details
- Born: Mae A. Gasparac; May 21, 1934 (age 92) Greenwood, Wisconsin, U.S.
- Party: Independence (from 2000)
- Other political affiliations: Reform (until 2000)
- Spouse: William Schunk
- Education: University of Wisconsin–Eau Claire
- Profession: Teacher

Mae A. Schunk (née Gasparac; born May 21, 1934) is an American politician and educator from Minnesota who served as the 45th lieutenant governor of Minnesota from 1999 to 2003. Elected on the same ticket as Jesse Ventura in the historic upset election of 1998 Minnesota gubernatorial election, she became the first Reform Party member elected as lieutenant governor of any state.

== Biography ==
Prior to her tenure as lieutenant governor, she was a teacher for 37 years. In his memoir, Ventura mentioned that he chose her to "balance out all the testosterone." During her term in office, she visited schools throughout the state and frequently read to students as part of her efforts to encourage literacy and appreciation for reading among young people.

In the 2000 presidential campaign, as polls showed Texas Governor George W. Bush and U.S. Vice President Al Gore tied in Minnesota within 2 weeks of Election Day, Schunk endorsed Gore at a rally held on Nicollet Avenue in downtown Minneapolis while Ventura committed himself to a third-party candidate, John Hagelin. Later, in an interview with CNN, Ventura commented that Schunk had asked him before making the endorsement and that he had consented to her decision.

Born to Croatian parents, Schunk lived with her husband, William Schunk (now deceased) in Inver Grove Heights, Minnesota; they have a son, Benjamin Schunk. Schunk was educated at the University of Wisconsin-Eau Claire.

== Electoral history ==
1998 Minnesota gubernatorial election
Party	Candidate	Votes	%	±%
Reform	Jesse Ventura	773,713	36.99%	New
Republican	Norm Coleman	717,350	34.29%	−29.04%
Democratic (DFL)	Skip Humphrey	587,528	28.09%	−6.02%
Green	Ken Pentel	7,034	0.34%	n/a
Libertarian	Frank Germann	1,932	0.09%	−0.80%
Grassroots	Chris Wright	1,727	0.08%	−1.12%
People's Champion	Fancy Ray McCloney	919	0.04%	n/a
Socialist Workers	Thomas Fiske	787	0.04%	−0.14%
	Write-ins	776		n/a
Majority		56,363	2.69%	
Turnout		2,091,766	60%	
Reform gain from Republican		Swing		

== See also ==
- List of female lieutenant governors in the United States

Party political offices
First	Reform nominee for Lieutenant Governor of Minnesota; 1998	Succeeded by Martha Robertson; Independence
Political offices
Preceded by Joanne Benson	Lieutenant Governor of Minnesota; 1999–2003	Succeeded by Carol Molnau
