= You and Me, Ghost =

Studio album by Sleeping in the Aviary
- Released: September 8, 2011
- Genres: Indie rock, pop rock, garage pop
- Label: Science of Sound Records

Sleeping in the Aviary chronology
Great Vacation! (2010)	You and Me, Ghost (2011)

You and Me, Ghost is the fourth and final studio album by indie rock band Sleeping in the Aviary. It was released on September 8, 2011 on the Science of Sound record label; the release took place at the Triple Rock Social Club in Minneapolis, Minnesota. It is also the band's only album with guitarist Kyle Sobczak. All 12 of the album's songs are about girls.

== Critical reception ==
Professional ratings
Review scores
Source	Rating
AllMusic	3.5/5 stars
Isthmus	(favorable)

The Shepherd Express described You and Me, Ghost as "wonderfully strange" and "a record rich with traces of The Clean, The Knack and Guided by Voices." Citypages named the album one of the best Minnesota albums of 2011. The newspaper's Loren Green wrote that on the album, "...there's a strong '60s influence at play in the crisp melodies and doo-wop refrains" and that "The stronger pop element gives extra bounce that contrasts with the deeper lyrics to form a complete package of joy and exploration." KCMP wrote of the album that "With a flair for '50s pop melodies, Sleeping in The Aviary keep their tunes short, sweet, filled with the catchiest hooks and even a shoo-be-do or two."

== Track listing ==
1. "Talking Out of Turn"
2. "Love Police"
3. "You and Me, Ghost"
4. "Someone Loves You"
5. "Ain't So Bad"
6. "So Lonely"
7. "Are You Afraid of Being Poor?"
8. "Karen, You're an Angel"
9. "Molly"
10. "On the Way Home"
11. "Infatuation"
12. "Pathetic Housewife Remembering Her First Martini"

== Personnel ==
- Elliott Kozel – vocals, guitar
- Phil Mahlstadt – bass
- Michael Sienkowski – drums, backing vocals
- Celeste Heule – accordion, keyboards, musical saw
- Kyle Sobczak – guitar
