= Oh, This Old Thing? =

Studio album by Sleeping in the Aviary
- Released: February 6, 2007
- Genre: Indie rock
- Length: 23:25
- Label: Science of Sound

Sleeping in the Aviary chronology
Oh, This Old Thing? (2007)	Expensive Vomit in a Cheap Hotel (2008)

Oh, This Old Thing? is the debut album by Twin Cities-based band Sleeping in the Aviary, released on February 6, 2007 on Science of Sound Records.

== Critical reception ==
Professional ratings
Review scores
Source	Rating
PopMatters	7/10 stars
Punknews.org	3.5/5 stars
Three Imaginary Girls	8.4/10

Tom Laskin of Isthmus described "Another Girl" as "...the kind of crazed, effervescent bass-drum-guitar confection that banishes the cares of a crappy day to the small, dark room where they belong."

== Track listing ==
No.	Title	Length
1.	"Face Lift Floats"	0:48
2.	"Pop Song"	1:23
3.	"Another Girl"	1:55
4.	"Gloworm"	1:51
5.	"Sign My Cast"	3:06
6.	"Maureen"	0:33
7.	"Drug Suitcase"	1:48
8.	"No Socks"	1:13
9.	"Only Son"	1:04
10.	"Lanugo"	2:26
11.	"Love Song"	3:06
12.	"Getting Thin"	1:39
13.	"Untitled"	2:33
