= Sexy Ester and the Pretty Mama Sisters =

American band in Madison, formed 2002

Sexy Ester is a musical group out of Madison, Wisconsin, consisting of Lyndsay Evans (lead vocals), Adam Eder (guitar), Roscoe Evans (keyboard), Paul Kennedy (drums), and Brad Schubert (bass guitar) and winner of several Madison Area Music Awards.

== Formation ==
The earliest roots of the band go back to 2002 when Lyndsay Evans, Adam Eder, Ken Hale, and Travis Smith formed a group known as Nefarious Star and the Wyrms. This band contained members of the defunct band Vampyres Sleep in the Shade (formerly Nimbus) along with powerhouse vocalist Lyndsay Evans. The early music was inspired by the classic rock sounds of bands like Led Zeppelin and Janis Joplin. In 2003 the group would move from the small town of Warren, Illinois leaving behind Smith.

== Establishment in Madison 2003–2010 ==
The band continued to change once in Madison forming the first version of Sexy Ester with Lyndsay Evans (vocals), Adam Eder (guitar), Ken Hale (drums), and Phil Fendley (bass guitar), however for the first month the band was known as Sexy Kaufman. Hale and Fendley soon departed leaving Evans and Eder performing as an acoustic duo. Later Hale briefly returned as rhythm guitarist with Adam Hart playing drums, but this formation would be short lived with Evans and Eder returning to an acoustic duo. In late 2006 with an album's worth of songs the band reached out to former Vampyres Sleep in the Shade drummer Dusty Hay. At this time they performed around the Madison area with harmonica player Mike Adams as a regular fixture in the group. In the Spring of 2008 Evans, Eder, and Hay headed to Megatone Studios to record their first full-length album Get Your Love On with Paul Schluter as producer/engineer and former member Ken Hale as executive producer. Adam Eder performed both the guitar and bass parts for the album. Shortly after the record was released the band brought in Brad Schubert to cover the duties on bass guitar.

In January 2009 Roscoe Evans made his debut with the band and the band's sound immediately shifted towards a new wave or dance-punk sound. The band headed back to the studio to lay down two more songs Tell Me You Do and Who Needs Loves Anyway?. The songs would be released on a two-song single CD, and the band would spend 2009 performing a number of well received shows in the Upper Midwest, and be nominated by the Isthmus as one of Madison's best new bands.

In 2010 the band returned to the studio to record four more songs, which added to the previous two would make up a 6-song EP. The band would also be nominated for a MAMA for best rock song. The EP, Hubba Bubba, was released on Slothtrop Records in November 2010.

== 2011–present ==
On January 27, 2011, Sexy Ester made the official announcement, via a message on Facebook to the members of their group, that Dusty Hay (drums) would be "hanging up his drumsticks" but would stay with the band until they could find a replacement. In May 2011 Sexy Ester announced that Paul Kennedy would take over on drums. Hay's final performance with Sexy Ester was at The 2011 Madison Area Music Awards. The band took home a total of four awards at the event including Alternative Album of the year for Hubba Bubba, Alternative song of the year for Love Bubble, Alternative performer of the year, and female vocalist of the year. In June the band released the single Glitter Baby in preparation for the release of their next record. In September the album Sequins Sins and Appetite was released along with the music video for Glitter Baby.

The band continued to play an aggressive slate of shows in support of the new record. This culminated in winning eight Madison Area Music Awards in 2012 including: Artist of the Year, Video of the Year, Alternative Song of the Year (Glitter Baby), Female Vocalist of the Year (Lyndsay Evans), Interpretive song of the year (Girl You Want), Specialty Instrument of the Year (Roscoe Evans), and Drummer of the Year (Paul Kennedy). On January 7, 2013, it was announced that Paul Kennedy was leaving the band and being replaced by Sun Prairie, WI native Jenna Joanis. In March 2013 the band released the EP Monomania to a great fan reaction. In the summer of 2014 Paul Kennedy resumed his drum playing duties. On April 18, 2015, the band released its newest creation self-titled Sexy Ester, and will tour the country in support.
