= Expensive Vomit in a Cheap Hotel =

Studio album by Sleeping in the Aviary
- Released: October 14, 2008
- Genre: Pop/Rock
- Length: 45:40
- Label: Science of Sound

Sleeping in the Aviary chronology
Oh, This Old Thing? (2007)	Expensive Vomit in a Cheap Hotel (2008)	Great Vacation! (2010)

Expensive Vomit in a Cheap Hotel is the second album by Minnesota-based band Sleeping in the Aviary. Originally released on October 14, 2008, it was re-released on vinyl on July 26, 2012.

== Recording and style ==
Sleeping in the Aviary's frontman, Elliott Kozel, wrote some of the songs on Expensive Vomit in a Cheap Hotel while in a hospital in Colorado waiting to find out if his mom would die (she didn't). The album was recorded soon after Kozel's mother's hospitalization, as well as a co-worker's brain aneurysm and a friend's drug overdose. He has since said that he didn't like Expensive Vomit very much and that he thought there were "four good songs" on it, and the album's style was "a conscious response to Panic! at the Disco’s last album", saying, "They weren’t keeping it real so we thought we’d try to add some flavor." An article in Free Press Houston noted that Expensive Vomit's music took "a decidedly more folky and weighty approach" than did Sleeping in the Aviary's previous album, Oh, This Old Thing?.

== Reception ==
Professional ratings
Review scores
Source	Rating
AllMusic	3.5/5 stars
Alternative Press	3/5
The Badger Herald	2/5 stars
MSN Music (Expert Witness)	A–
No Ripcord	6/10
Punknews.org	3.5/5 stars
Three Imaginary Girls	8.5/10

The album received mainly positive reviews; for example, The A.V. Club wrote that it "opens up the band’s tender side amid its lo-fi scars and unruly freak-outs," and Katjusa Cisar described it as "a blistering and catchy mix of punk, folk and rock". Cisar later named the album one of the best Madison releases of 2008. It was also ranked as the second best Madison album of 2008 by Rich Albertoni in Isthmus and one of the 10 best "albums you didn't hear" of 2008 by Magnet. Well-known music critic Robert Christgau awarded the album an A−, later ranking it #43 on his Dean's List for 2008.

== Track listing ==
No.	Title	Length
1.	"Write On"	3:05
2.	"Calm Me Down"	3:32
3.	"Gas Mask Blues"	5:05
4.	"Maybe You're the Same"	3:54
5.	"Things Look Good"	2:56
6.	"I'm Old"	2:46
7.	"Everybody's Different, Everybody Dies"	2:42
8.	"You're a Party"	4:11
9.	"Ladybug Death Song"	4:01
10.	"Girl in the Ground"	4:13
11.	"Windshield"	9:15

== Personnel ==
1. Elliott Kozel—vocals, guitar, songwriting
2. Phil Mahlstadt—bass guitar
3. Kyle Sobczak—guitar
4. Celeste Huele—accordion, musical saw
5. Michael Sienkowski—drums
