= Sleeping in the Aviary =

Indie-rock band from Wisconsin and Minnesota

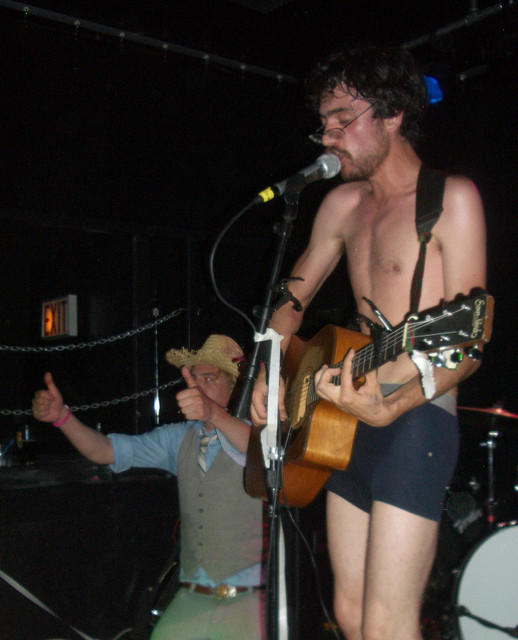
- Sleeping in the Aviary performing live. Elliott Kozel is on the right.

Background information
- Origin: Madison, Wisconsin
- Genres: Indie rock, pop rock
- Years active: 2004–2012
- Label: Science of Sound
- Members: Elliott Kozel, Phil Mahlstadt, Michael Sienkowski, Kyle Sobczak, Celeste Heule

Sleeping in the Aviary was an indie-rock band established in Madison, Wisconsin, but which was based in the Twin Cities area of Minnesota at the time they broke up in 2012. Their musical style has been compared to that of "early XTC and Talking Heads," Violent Femmes, Nirvana, Neutral Milk Hotel, and Bon Iver.

== History ==
The band's two core members were guitarist-vocalist Elliott Kozel and bassist Phil Mahlstadt. They formed Sleeping in the Aviary in 2003 in Madison, where it played its first show in the spring of 2004. They cycled through several additional members before deciding on drummer Michael Sienkowski as their band's third member. Kozel has offered conflicting explanations for the origin of the band's name, such as that he came up with it after his uncle sent him a bottle of Australian cologne by the same name, or that it, in his words, "came from a sexual experience our guitar player Porkchop [referring to Kyle Sobczak] had as a 12-year-old boy." Celeste Heule, an accordion and musical saw player, joined the band in 2008. Also that year, the band released a split 7-inch with another Madison based garage rock band The Hussy. Kozel then moved from Madison to Minneapolis. Late in 2010, after their third album, Great Vacation! was released, Kozel and his girlfriend parted ways, and several months later, he said he was planning for their next album to be a breakup record replete with “fuzzed-out, doo-wop music”.

The band went on tour for nearly two months at the start of 2011. Later that year, they promoted their fourth album, You and Me, Ghost, by making a 13-minute infomercial described by the Minnesota Daily as "a tongue-in-cheek homage to all those late-night advertisements you’ve probably fallen asleep to once or twice." Fancy Ray McCloney appears in the video. Also in 2011, while the band was breaking up, Kozel formed a side project called Tickle Torture. His first release as Tickle Torture was an EP entitled Spiritual Machete, released in 2012, which was followed by the release of another EP, Spectrophilia, in 2014. Kozel has described Tickle Torture as "like if Prince and Justin Timberlake were [having sex] in a dumpster."

== Reception ==
KCMP has described Sleeping in the Aviary's music as "energetic pop-rock". A Punknews.org reviewer described the band's debut album, Oh, This Old Thing?, as "snotty, fuck-all lo-fi power-pop," while Wisconsin Public Television described their style as "country-punk-rock." Reviewers have also noted that Sleeping in the Aviary's music resembles that of the 1950s and 60's, and have compared the music on their fourth album, "You and Me, Ghost," to The Clean, the Knack, and Guided by Voices. A Minnesota Daily review of You and Me, Ghost wrote that "Perhaps Sleeping in the Aviary’s most commendable feat is their ability to take some of the most basic elements of early rock ‘n’ roll and mold their music into something that sounds entirely original" and concluded that the band was "this city’s best-kept secret" [referring to Minneapolis].

== Discography ==
- Oh, This Old Thing? (2007)
- Expensive Vomit in a Cheap Hotel (2008)
- Great Vacation! (2010)
- You and Me, Ghost (2011)
