= 1994 Minnesota Attorney General election =

- November 8, 1994
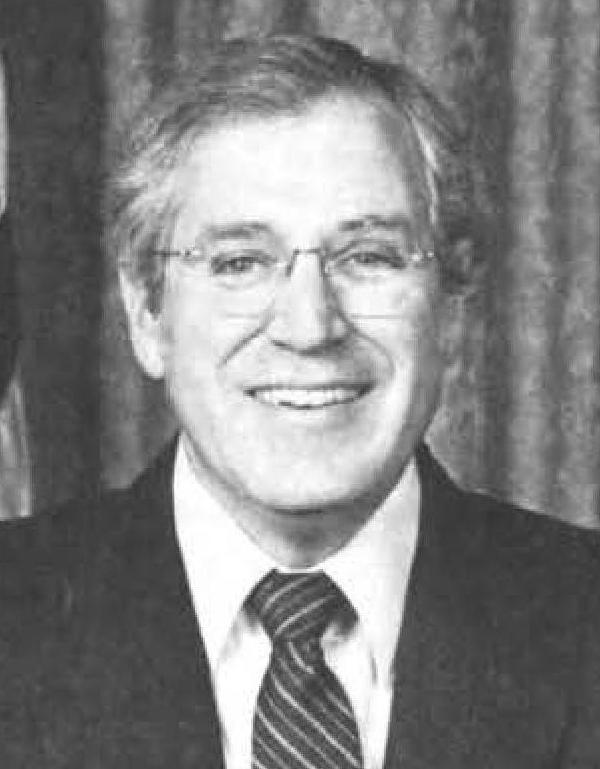

Nominee	Skip Humphrey	Sharon Anderson
Party	Democratic (DFL)	Republican
Popular vote	1,115,285	488,753
Percentage	64.7%	28.3%
- Humphrey: 30–40% 40–50% 50–60% 60–70% 70–80% 80–90% >90% Anderson: 30–40% 40–50% 50–60% 60–70% 70–80% Tie: 40–50% 50% No votes
Attorney General before election
Skip Humphrey
Democratic (DFL)
Elected Attorney General
Skip Humphrey
Democratic (DFL)

The 1994 Minnesota Attorney General election was held on Tuesday, November 8, 1994, to elect the Minnesota Attorney General for a four-year term. Incumbent DFLer Skip Humphrey ran for re-election to a fourth term, ultimately defeating Republican nominee Sharon Anderson. The election marked the seventh attorney general race in a row won by the DFL since 1970. Humphrey won every single county in the state, becoming the first person to do so since Senator Hubert Humphrey in 1976, and the most recent person to do so as of 2026, although Governor Arne Carlson won all but three counties in the adjacent gubernatorial election, and U.S. senator Amy Klobuchar won all but two in 2012.

== Democratic–Farmer–Labor primary ==
The primary was held on September 13. Incumbent attorney general Skip Humphrey won the DFL nomination. Humphrey faced only token opposition for renomination from LaRouchite candidates.

=== Candidates ===
==== Nominated in primary ====
- Hubert "Skip" Humphrey III, incumbent attorney general, former state senator

==== Elimated in primary ====
- Kent S. Herschbach, LaRouchite perennial candidate, truck driver
- Lewis du Pont Smith, LaRouchite and heir of the du Pont family

=== Results ===
Results by county: Humphrey: 70–80%; 80–90%; 90-100%

1994 DFL Primary Election for Minnesota Attorney General
Party	Candidate	Votes	%
Democratic (DFL)	Hubert "Skip" Humphrey III	329,147	87.91%
Democratic (DFL)	Kent S. Herschbach	24,590	6.57%
Democratic (DFL)	Lewis du Pont Smith	20,668	5.52%
Total votes		374,405	100%

== Independent-Republican primary ==
The primary was held on September 13. Sharon Anderson won the Independent-Republican nomination over Republican Party-endorsed candidate Tom Neuville, an upset attributed to Anderson's "very electable name."

=== Candidates ===
==== Nominated in primary ====
- Sharon Anderson, activist, perennial candidate

==== Elimated in primary ====
- Thomas M. Neuville, state senator
- Andrew Olson, LaRouchite farmer

=== Results ===
Results by county: Anderson: 30–40%; 40–50%; 50–60%; Neuville: 30–40%; 40–50%; 50–60%; 60–70%; 80–90%; Olson: 30–40%

1994 Independent-Republican Primary Election for Minnesota Attorney General
Party	Candidate	Votes	%
Republican	Sharon Anderson	148,660	40.01%
Republican	Thomas M. Neuville	127,992	34.45%
Republican	Andrew Olson	94,926	25.55%
Total votes		371,578	100%

== Other candidates ==
=== Grassroots Party ===
==== Nominee ====
- Dean W. Amundson

== General election ==
=== Results ===
1994 Minnesota Attorney General election
Party	Candidate	Votes	%	±%
Democratic (DFL)	Skip Humphrey (incumbent)	1,115,285	64.67%	
Republican	Sharon Anderson	488,753	28.34%	
Grassroots Party	Dean W. Amundson	69,776	4.05%	
N/A	Write Ins	50,681	2.94%	
Total votes		1,724,495	100.00%	
