= Montale =

Montale may refer to:

- Eugenio Montale (1896–1981), Italian poet
- Montale (San Marino), one of the Three Towers of San Marino
- Montale, Tuscany, municipality in the Province of Pistoia in the Italian region Tuscany
- Montale Rangone, village in Castelnuovo Rangone
- 22379 Montale, minor planet

== See also ==
- Mondale (disambiguation)
