= 1988 United States Senate election in Minnesota =

- November 8, 1988
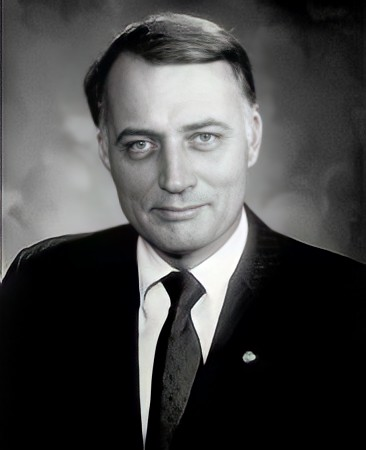

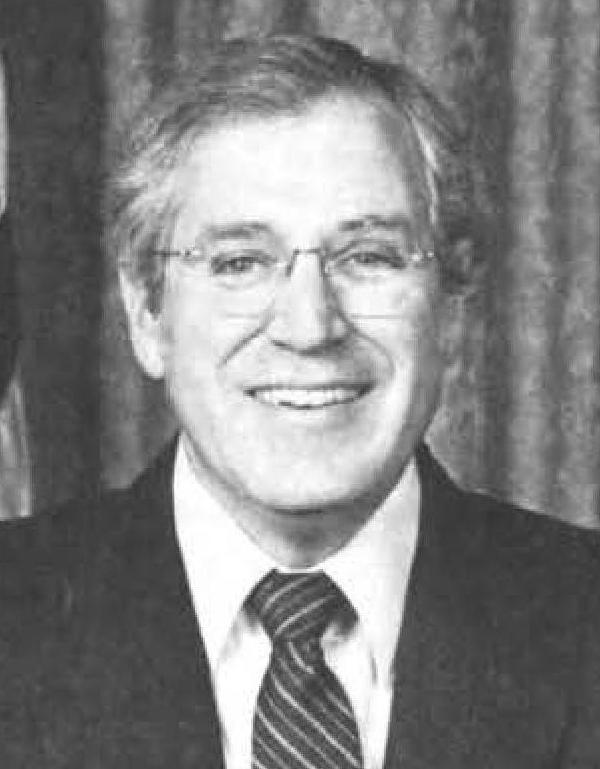
| Nominee | David Durenberger | Skip Humphrey |
| Party | Ind.-Republican | Democratic (DFL) |
| Popular vote | 1,176,210 | 856,694 |
| Percentage | 56.18% | 40.92% |
- County results Durenberger: 50–60% 60–70% Humphrey: 50–60%
U.S. senator before election
David Durenberger
Ind.-Republican
Elected U.S. Senator
David Durenberger
Ind.-Republican

The 1988 United States Senate election in Minnesota was held on November 8, 1988. Incumbent Republican U.S. Senator David Durenberger won re-election to his third term. He was challenged by the DFL candidate Hubert "Skip" Humphrey III, the son of former vice president Hubert Humphrey. The seat had previously been held by both of Skip Humphrey's parents. This is the last time that Minnesota voted for a Senate candidate and a presidential candidate of different political parties as Durenberger, a liberal Republican, remained popular among Minnesotans during his tenure in the Senate.

== Major candidates ==
=== Democratic ===
- Skip Humphrey, Attorney General of Minnesota and former State Senator

=== Republican ===
- David Durenberger, incumbent U.S. Senator since 1978

== Results ==
General election results
| Party | Candidate | Votes | % |
|---|---|---|---|
| Ind.-Republican | David Durenberger (incumbent) | 1,176,210 | 56.18% |
| Democratic (DFL) | Skip Humphrey | 856,694 | 40.92% |
| Minnesota Progressive Party | Polly Mann | 44,474 | 2.12% |
| Grassroots | Derrick Grimmer | 9,016 | 0.43% |
| Libertarian | Arlen Overvig | 4,039 | 0.19% |
| Socialist Workers | Wendy Lyons | 3,105 | 0.15% |
| Total votes | | 2,093,538 | 100.00% |
| Majority | | 319,516 | 15.26% |
| Ind.-Republican hold | | | |

== See also ==
- 1988 United States Senate elections
