= Great Vacation! =

Studio album by Sleeping in the Aviary
- Released: November 30, 2010
- Genres: Indie rock, garage pop
- Length: 38:42
- Label: Science of Sound

Sleeping in the Aviary chronology
Expensive Vomit in a Cheap Hotel (2008)	Great Vacation! (2010)	You and Me, Ghost (2011)

Great Vacation! is the third studio album by Minneapolis, Minnesota-based band Sleeping in the Aviary, released on November 30, 2010 on Science of Sound Records. In January 2011, the band released a trilogy of music videos made for three of the album's songs: "Y.M.C.A. (No Not That One)", "Maria's Ghost", and "Last Kiss on a Sinking Ship". The video for "Last Kiss on a Sinking Ship" had originally been released in November 2010, shortly before the album itself was released.

== Style ==
Great Vacation! is somewhat more soul-influenced than Sleeping in the Aviary's previous albums, and features an increased emphasis on polished melodies. Many of the album's lyrics are about surreal topics, and almost all of them are about love. Sleeping in the Aviary frontman Elliott Kozel has called the album “a gooey exploration of spine-tingling animalistic human behavior.”

Professional ratings
Review scores
Source	Rating
AllMusic	3/5 stars
WGTB	(favorable)

== Track listing ==
1. YMCA (No, Not That One)
2. Weightlessly in Love
3. You Don't Have to Drive
4. Maria's Ghost
5. Last Kiss on a Sinking Ship
6. Blacked-Out Fun
7. Nothing
8. Axes Ground Looth Tooth
9. Start the Car
10. The Very Next Day I Died
