= Ruth Johnson (Minnesota politician) =

American politician (born 1947)

Member of the Minnesota House of Representatives from the 23A district
- In office 2005–2006

Member of the Minnesota House of Representatives from the 24B district
- In office 2001–2002
- In office 1997–1998

Personal details
- Born: 1947 (age 78–79) Minneapolis, Minnesota, U.S.
- Party: Minnesota Democratic–Farmer–Labor Party
- Education: Gustavus Adolphus College, Indiana University
- Occupation: college administrator

Ruth Johnson (born 1947) is an American politician in the state of Minnesota. She served in the Minnesota House of Representatives.
