= Ted Mondale =

American politician (born 1957)

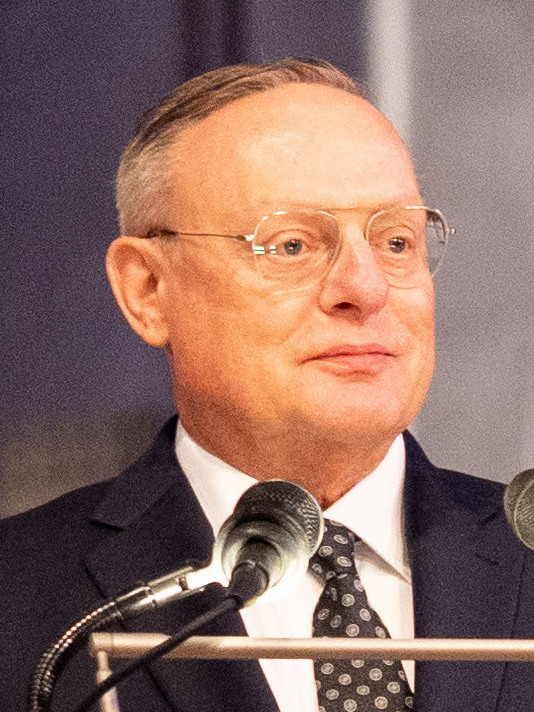
- Mondale speaking at the funeral of Jimmy Carter in 2025

Chairman of the Metropolitan Council
- In office January 7, 1999 – January 6, 2003
- Governor: Jesse Ventura
- Preceded by: Curtis W. Johnson
- Succeeded by: Peter Bell

Member of the Minnesota Senate from the 44th district
- In office January 8, 1991 – January 6, 1997
- Preceded by: Phyllis W. McQuaid
- Succeeded by: Steve P. Kelley

Personal details
- Born: Theodore Adams Mondale; October 12, 1957 (age 68) Minneapolis, Minnesota, U.S.
- Party: Democratic
- Spouses: Pamela Burris (m. 1988; div. 2013) Rebecca Mondale (m. 2014)
- Children: 3
- Relatives: Walter Mondale (father); Joan Mondale (mother); Eleanor Mondale (sister); William Mondale (brother)
- Education: University of Minnesota (BA); William Mitchell College of Law (JD)

Theodore Adams Mondale (born October 12, 1957) is an American politician and businessman who served as a member of the Minnesota Senate from 1991 to 1997. He is the elder son of the late former U.S. Vice President Walter Mondale and the late Joan Mondale.

== Career ==
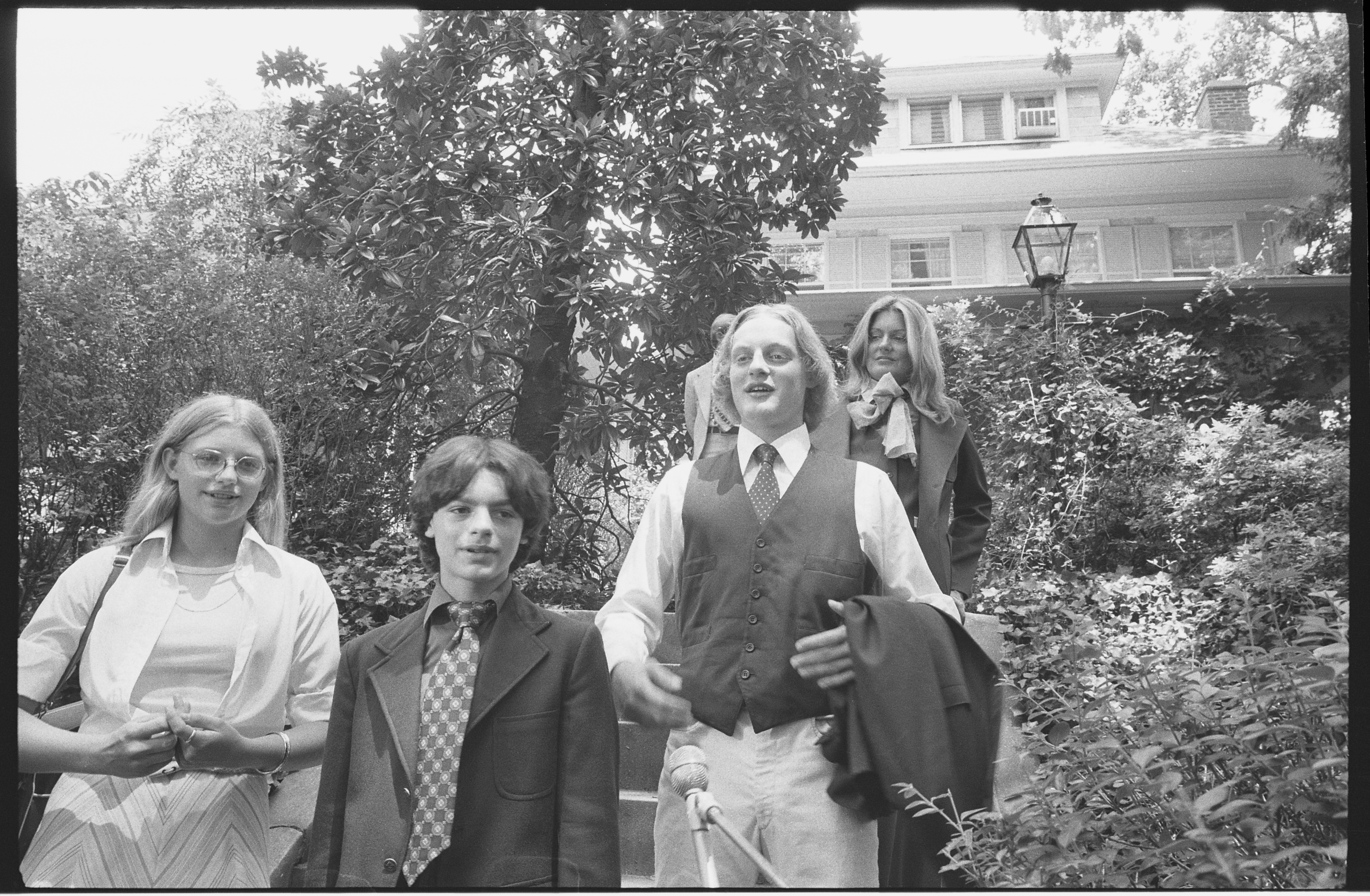
Senator Walter Mondale's children, (l-r) Eleanor, William and Teddy, standing in front of their home in Washington, D.C., before leaving for the Democratic National Convention in New York City, 1976

After graduating from the University of Minnesota and William Mitchell Law School, Mondale joined the law firm of Lakin Hoffman Daily and Lindgren in 1987, where he worked as an Associate Attorney in the Administrative Law Department.

In 2003, Mondale founded NAZCA Solutions Inc., a company that developed and implemented a SaaS Property Title Automated Service for the property settlement services industry. At NAZCA Mondale raised over $11 million of start up capital for the life of the company. In 2011, he was named the Vice President of Strategy and Research at Greater MSP, a newly created regional economic development organization.

== Political career ==
From 1991 to 1997, Mondale was a member of the Minnesota Senate. During his time in the Senate Mondale also served as the Vice President of Public Sector Services for United Healthcare.

In 1998, he sought the Democratic primary nomination for Minnesota governor in 1998, along with the son of another former Vice President from Minnesota, Skip Humphrey, the son of Hubert Humphrey.

In 1999, Mondale was appointed the Chair of the Metropolitan Council by then Governor Jesse Ventura to oversee the seven county regional government body in charge of regional planning, transit, wastewater operations, regional parks and affordable housing in the Twin Cities.

In 2011, he was also named chair of the Metropolitan Sports Facilities Commission by Governor Mark Dayton. In 2012, Mondale was named the CEO of the newly formed Minnesota Sports Facilities Authority. As CEO of the MSFA, Mondale was the Dayton's administration's point person for getting the stadium's public financing passed by the legislature and was responsible with overseeing the state's investment in the new $1.2 billion stadium.

Mondale read a eulogy written by his father on the occasion of the 2025 state funeral of former President Jimmy Carter.

== Personal life ==
Mondale was married to Pam Burris, with whom he has three children; the couple separated in 2011 and divorced in 2013. Mondale married Rebecca Mondale in 2014.

Mondale's sister, Eleanor Mondale, was a television personality who died of brain cancer at the age of 51 in 2011.
