= Eleanor Mondale =

American media personality (1960–2011)

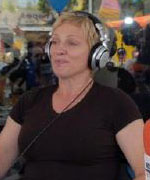
- Mondale Poling in 2007
- Born: Eleanor Jean Mondale; January 19, 1960; Minneapolis, Minnesota, U.S.
- Died: September 17, 2011 (aged 51); Prior Lake, Minnesota, U.S.
- Education: St. Lawrence University
- Known for: Radio and television host
- Political party: Democratic
- Spouses: Keith Van Horne (m. 1988; div. 1989) Greg Malban (m. 1991; div. 1991) Chan Poling (m. 2005)
- Parent(s): Walter Mondale; Joan Mondale

Eleanor Jane Mondale Poling (January 19, 1960 – September 17, 2011) was an American radio personality, television host, actress, and political activist. She briefly pursued acting, with small roles in TV shows, as well as roles in films later on. She chiefly pursued journalism, working in local radio and television in Los Angeles, Chicago, and Minneapolis, before reaching US national television on networks such as NBC, E!, ESPN, and CBS. Despite her famous last name as the daughter of Walter Mondale, she was seen as having made a career of her own.

== Biography ==
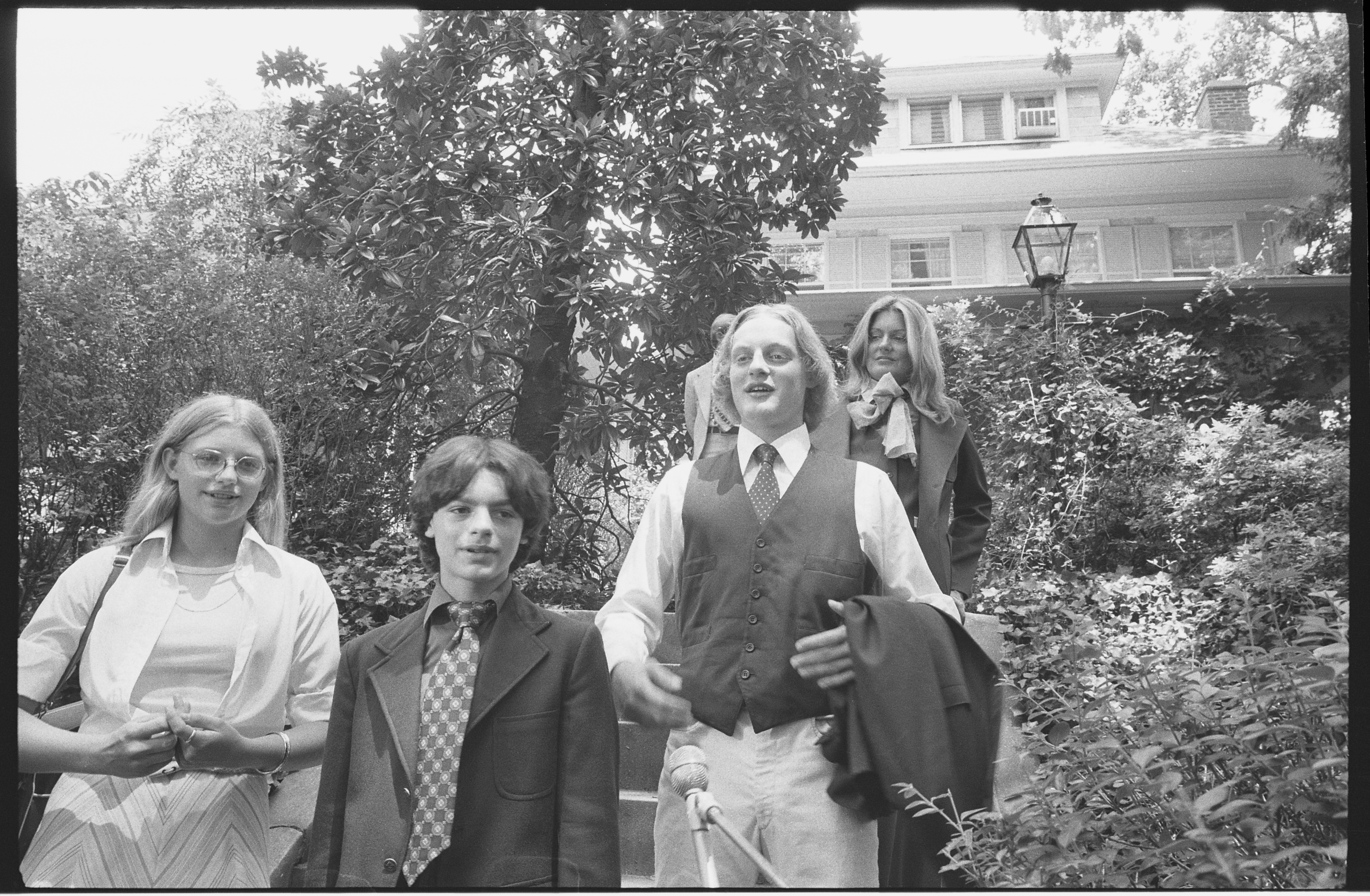
Senator Walter Mondale's children (l-r), Eleanor, William and Teddy, standing in front of their home in Washington, D.C., before leaving for the Democratic National Convention in New York City, 1976

Mondale was the only daughter of Joan Mondale and former Vice President Walter Mondale. Her older brother is former Minnesota State Senator Theodore Adams "Ted" Mondale. Her younger brother is attorney William Hall Mondale, the former assistant attorney general of Minnesota (1990–2000).

For her senior year of high school, Mondale attended St. Timothy's, a boarding school outside of Baltimore. After graduating from St. Lawrence University in Canton, New York, she moved to begin a career in Hollywood.

== Personal life ==
After she completed her college education, Mondale quickly earned a reputation in the media for being a "wild child", although she claimed many of the rumors were unfounded. She was married three times and had no children. She was involved with some high-profile men, including, reportedly, former President Bill Clinton, during his time in office.

Mondale's first marriage, to football player Keith Van Horne, lasted from April 9, 1988, until August 1989, when Van Horne filed for divorce. In 1990, she dated rock singer-songwriter Warren Zevon, traveling on tour with him to Australia. She also dated Washington Redskins offensive tackle George Starke.

Mondale's second marriage, from June 21, 1991, to November 1991, was to Greg Malban, a DJ known as Greg Thunder.

In 1999, Mondale sold her house in Los Angeles to move to New York to be with her then-boyfriend, New York plastic and reconstructive surgeon Joe DeBellis.

In June 2005, Mondale married Minneapolis musician Chan Poling, of the group The New Standards and The Suburbs. They lived on a small farm in Minnesota, where they raised miniature horses until her death.

=== Acting career ===
Mondale took time off from college in 1981 to move to Hollywood. She worked briefly as an extra and had one speaking line in the TV series 240-Robert. She then returned to St. Lawrence University, in Canton, New York, graduating in 1982. By January 1983, Mondale was back in Hollywood, where she had small roles on such TV shows as Three's Company, Dynasty, and Matt Houston.

Eleanor Mondale was a regular guest on Howard Stern's E! TV show during the late 1990s and early 2000s.

=== Journalism career ===
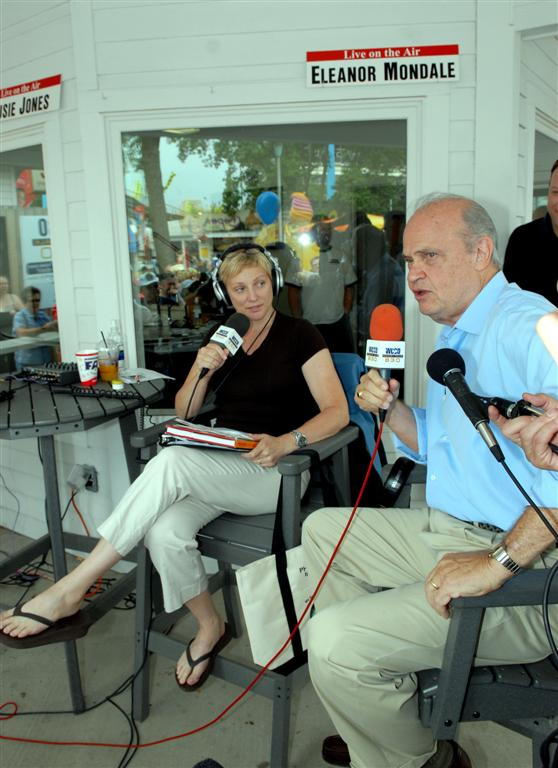
Mondale interviewed Fred Dalton Thompson at the 2007 Minnesota State Fair.

Mondale began her journalism career while still in Los Angeles, taking a job at KABC-TV in 1985. She left the station in late 1985 and soon moved to Chicago, getting her first radio break as a helicopter reporter at WMAQ (AM). She continued taking fill-in radio news jobs at various Chicago radio stations, including WCKG-FM. She also was waiting for the pilot of a King World Productions show, The Rock 'n Roll Evening News, to be sold. Within a few months the show began airing in national syndication, with Mondale working as its Midwest correspondent.

In 1986, Mondale signed a one-year contract with powerhouse Chicago radio station WGN (AM) to appear as a frequent contributor to programs. In early 1987, she joined Chicago radio station WCKG-FM as a morning news anchor. In June 1987, she shifted to being the co-host of WCKG's morning show alongside John Fisher. In early 1988, she took a leave of absence from WCKG to collaborate with a Chicago writer on a book about the children of U.S. presidents.

In June 1989, Mondale took a job in Minneapolis as an entertainment reporter for WCCO-TV. In March 1990, she quit unexpectedly just a few days before a local magazine was to publish a feature on Mondale titled "Walter and Joan's Wild Child".

After leaving WCCO and spending some time in Australia, Mondale became a morning sidekick on WLOL-FM in Minneapolis, where she remained until the station was bought by Minnesota Public Radio in 1991. She also hosted "The Great American TV Poll" on the Lifetime cable channel.

In April 1991, Mondale returned to Chicago's airwaves as a morning sidekick at WKQX, working alongside morning host Robert Murphy. Mondale and fellow sidekick Dan Walker were forced out of WKQX in January 1993.

After leaving WKQX, Mondale began working in television. In March 1993, Mondale and Robin Leach co-hosted a two-hour special on national television about Madonna titled "Madonna Exposed". In early 1994, Mondale began working as a correspondent for NBC's Today show.

In mid-1994, Mondale landed a job as anchor/host of Q and E, a half-hour weekly celebrity show airing on E!, and was also a regular correspondent for the network's news division. In 1996, Mondale was hired by CBS as a Los Angeles-based correspondent for This Morning.

Mondale also later hosted the E! shows Wild On in 1997 and E! News Live. She worked on ESPN as a reporter on the horse racing events, which lasted two years (2002–2003). She covered for ESPN2 the Professional Rodeo Cowboys Association. After ESPN, she co-hosted The World's Greatest Auto Shows for the Speed Channel in 2004 and 2005. She worked for the CBS Television show This Morning.

In 2006, after battling brain cancer for the first time, Mondale signed on as a host at WCCO-AM. She remained there until 2009, when she left the airwaves to go on disability because of her cancer's recurrence.

In 2013, she was posthumously inducted into the Minnesota Broadcasting Hall of Fame.

=== Film career ===
Mondale had five speaking lines in the opening minutes of the 1991 film Drop Dead Fred. She appeared in the 1999 film Ground Control as Christine, and narrated the feature documentary film Fritz: The Walter Mondale Story (2008), which details the life of her father and aspects of her own childhood. She also appeared in the short film Mirage (2004), directed by Sayer Frey and produced by Shelli Ainsworth.

=== Illness and death ===
After a bout of seizures, Mondale was diagnosed with brain cancer in June 2005. In the summer of 2006, the cancer was in remission, but she announced in February 2008 that a small tumor had returned and that she would seek treatment at the Mayo Clinic. Mondale was again diagnosed with brain cancer in August 2009 and was scheduled to undergo surgery later that month. She died from the disease at her home in Minnesota on September 17, 2011, at the age of 51.

== See also ==
- List of people with brain tumors
