= Joan Mondale =

Second Lady of the United States from 1977 to 1981

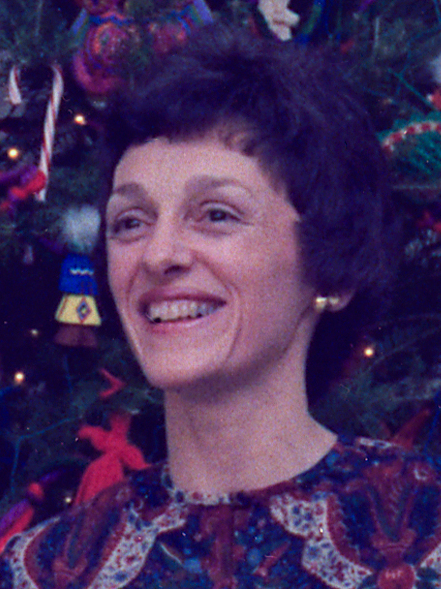
- Mondale in 1977

Second Lady of the United States
- In role January 20, 1977 – January 20, 1981
- Vice President: Walter Mondale
- Preceded by: Happy Rockefeller
- Succeeded by: Barbara Bush

Personal details
- Born: Joan Adams; August 8, 1930 Eugene, Oregon, U.S.
- Died: February 3, 2014 (aged 83) Minneapolis, Minnesota, U.S.
- Resting place: Ashes scattered at St. Croix River
- Party: Democratic
- Spouse: Walter Mondale (m. 1955)
- Children: Ted; Eleanor; William
- Education: Macalester College (BA)

Joan Mondale (née Adams; August 8, 1930 – February 3, 2014) was the second lady of the United States from 1977 until 1981 as the wife of Walter Mondale, the 42nd vice president of the United States. She was an artist and author and served on the boards of several organizations. For her promotion of the arts, she was affectionately dubbed Joan of Art.

== Family and education ==
Joan Adams was born on August 8, 1930, in Eugene, Oregon, one of three daughters of the Rev. John Maxwell Adams, a Presbyterian minister, and his wife, the former Eleanor Jane Hall. She attended Media Friends School, an integrated Quaker school in Media, Pennsylvania; a public school in Columbus, Ohio; and later St. Paul Academy and Summit School in St. Paul, Minnesota. In 1952, she graduated from Macalester College in St. Paul, where her father served as chaplain, with a bachelor's degree in history. Following graduation from college, she worked at the Boston Museum of Fine Arts and the Minneapolis Institute of Art.

On December 27, 1955, Joan married Minneapolis lawyer Walter "Fritz" Mondale, whom she had met on a blind date.

The couple had three children:

- Ted Mondale (b. October 12, 1957), Minnesota politician, former State Senator, and candidate for Governor of Minnesota in 1998.
- Eleanor Jane Mondale Poling (January 19, 1960 – September 17, 2011), television and radio personality who died of brain cancer at the age of 51.
- William Hall Mondale (b. February 27, 1962), Assistant Attorney General, Office of the Minnesota Attorney General (1990–2000)

== Political life ==
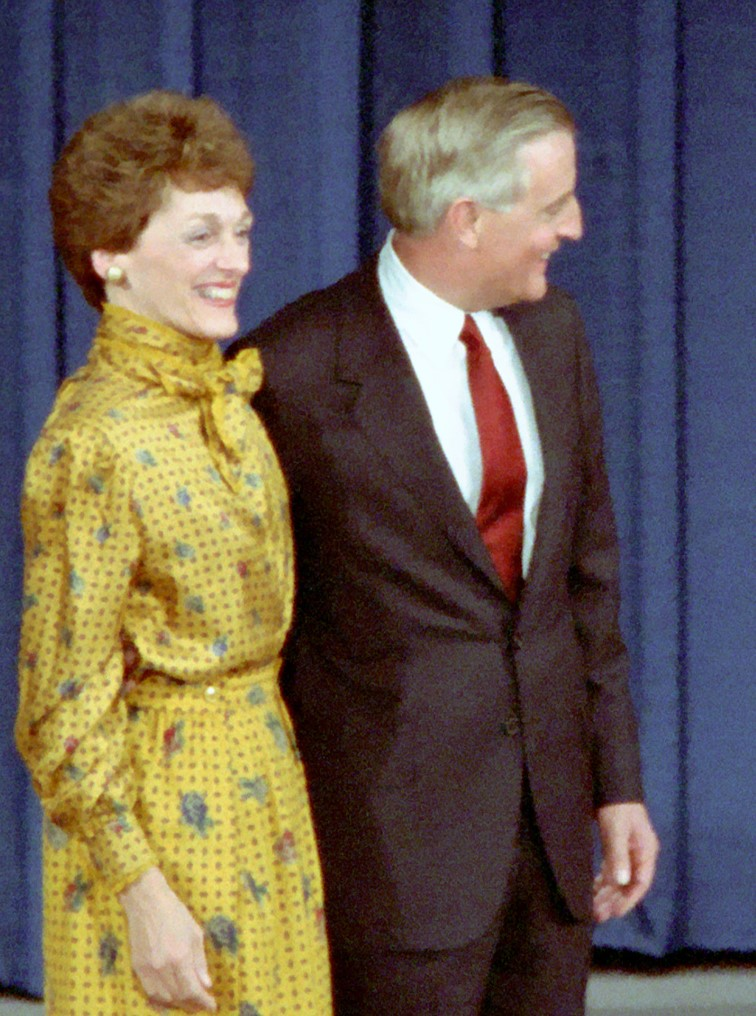
Joan and Walter Mondale in 1984

In 1964, Walter Mondale replaced Hubert Humphrey as a U.S. Senator, serving until 1976, when Democratic presidential candidate Jimmy Carter selected him as his running-mate in his successful bid for the Presidency.

Joan Mondale then became Second Lady, succeeding Happy Rockefeller, during her husband's term as vice president from 1977 to 1981. She and her husband also became the first Second Lady and vice president to live at Number One Observatory Circle. She was succeeded as Second Lady by Barbara Bush.

Joan Mondale was a supporter of the Equal Rights Amendment and often lent her support publicly to the cause.

Out of office during Ronald Reagan's first term as president, Walter Mondale won the Democratic presidential nomination in 1984. As a prospective First Lady, Joan Mondale told Maureen Dowd of The New York Times that she would not talk about recipes or clothes during the campaign, but when her husband's political opponents took issue with this, costing him votes, she published The Mondale Family Cookbook, with recipes including Fettucine à la Pimiento Mondale, and declared that she was a "traditional wife and mother and supporter".

Walter Mondale lost the election, and the Mondales returned to Minnesota, where they lived until his term as U.S. Ambassador to Japan from 1993 to 1996, after which he resumed his Minneapolis-based law practice.

== Joan of Art ==
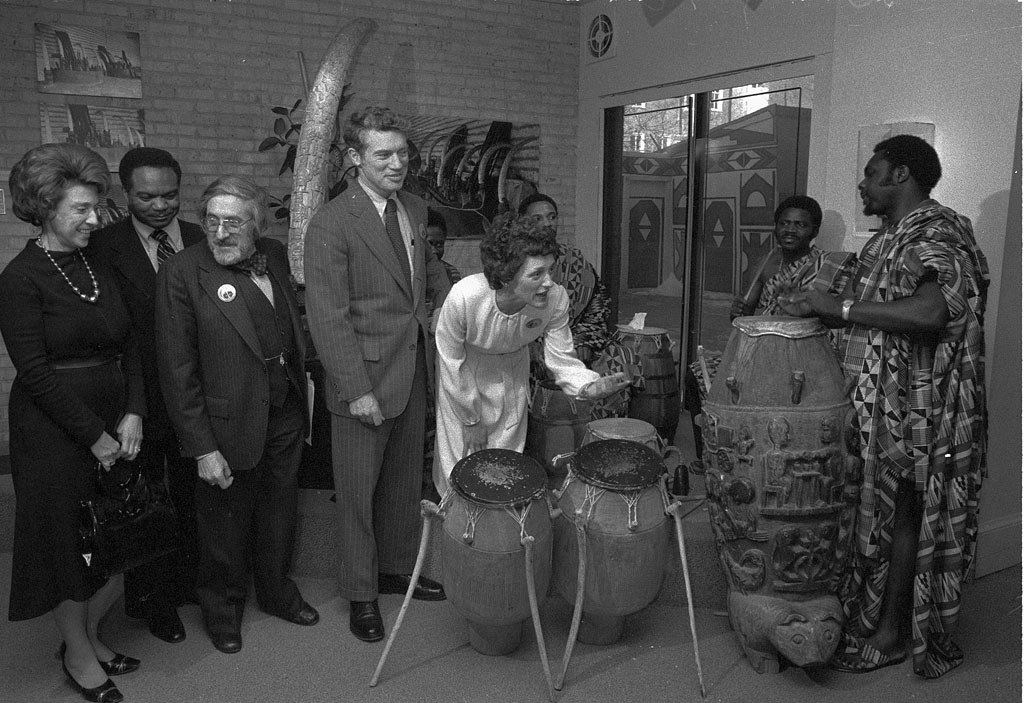
Mondale playing the drums after a press conference at the National Museum of African Art with, (l–r), Rep. Lindy Boggs, Rep. Walter E. Fauntroy, Warren M. Robbins (founder of the museum), and Sen. Wendell Anderson, 1978

Joan Mondale was a lifelong practitioner, patron, and advocate of the arts, and her nickname 'Joan of Art' was a tribute.

An accomplished potter, she studied art at college, and then worked in galleries, before moving to Washington as a Senator's wife in 1964, and led guided tours at the National Gallery of Art. In 1972, she wrote a book Politics in Art, examining how political commentary is reflected in artworks. Later she regularly gave tours as a guide for friend Ellen Proxmire (the then wife of Wisconsin Democratic Senator William Proxmire)'s company whirl-around.

Later, as Second Lady, she turned the Vice Presidential Mansion into a showcase of American art, with works by artists including Robert Rauschenberg, Edward Hopper, Louise Nevelson, and Ansel Adams. At this time, she also served as chairperson of the Federal Council on the Arts and Humanities.

As the U.S. Ambassador's wife in Japan, she enthusiastically promoted inter-cultural understanding through art, redecorating the Embassy with American paintings and organising tours with a bi-lingual guide. She studied Japanese art, and impressed the Mayor of Kyoto by presenting him with a ceramic bowl she had made herself in the traditional Mashiko style.

She was the author of Letters From Japan, a collection of essays about life overseas published in 1998.

Back in Minnesota, Mondale continued to make her own pottery and promote the arts. She served on the boards of the Minnesota Orchestra, Walker Art Center, Macalester College and the National Portrait Gallery. In 2004, the Textile Center in Minneapolis endowed an exhibition space in her honor, the Joan Mondale Gallery.

She also served as a member of the Postmaster General's Citizens' Stamp Advisory Committee from 2005 to 2010.

== Death ==
On February 2, 2014, Mondale's family announced that she had entered hospice care due to Alzheimer's disease. She died at a care facility in Minneapolis the following day, at age 83. Her remains were cremated, and later dispersed along the St. Croix River.

== Legacy ==
The Joan and Walter Mondale Award for Public Service is named for Mondale and her husband.

== Books ==
- Politics in Art. Minneapolis: Lerner Publications Co. 1972. ISBN 978-0-8225-0170-1.
- The Mondale Family Cookbook. Mondale for President Committee. 1984. ASIN B000LGQZPC.
- Mondale, Joan (1997). Letters from Japan. J Mondale. ISBN 978-0-9662-2200-5.

Honorary titles
Preceded by Happy Rockefeller	Second Lady of the United States; 1977–1981	Succeeded by Barbara Bush
