= Doug Johnson (Minnesota politician) =

American politician (1942–2022)

Member of the Minnesota Senate from the 6th district
- In office 1977–2002

Member of the Minnesota House of Representatives from the 6B district
- In office 1973–1976

Member of the Minnesota House of Representatives from the 63rd district
- In office 1971–1972

Personal details
- Born: August 17, 1942 Cook, Minnesota, U.S.
- Died: November 7, 2022 (aged 80)
- Party: Minnesota Democratic–Farmer–Labor Party
- Spouse: Denesse Hoole
- Children: 2
- Education: University of Minnesota Duluth, University of Wisconsin–Superior
- Occupation: Counselor

Douglas J. Johnson (August 17, 1942 – November 7, 2022) was an American politician in the state of Minnesota.

Johnson was born in Cook, Minnesota and graduated from Cook High School. He received his associate degree from Virginia Community College (now Mesabi Range College) and his bachelor's degree from University of Minnesota Duluth. He also received his master's degree from University of Wisconsin–Superior. Johnson was a high school guidance counselor. He served as the mayor of Cook, Minnesota and was a Democrat. Johnson served in the Minnesota House of Representatives from 1971 to 1976 and in the Minnesota State Senate from 1977 to 2002. Johnson, his wife, and family lived in Tower, Minnesota.
