= Fancy Ray =

American stand-up comedian

Fancy Ray McCloney
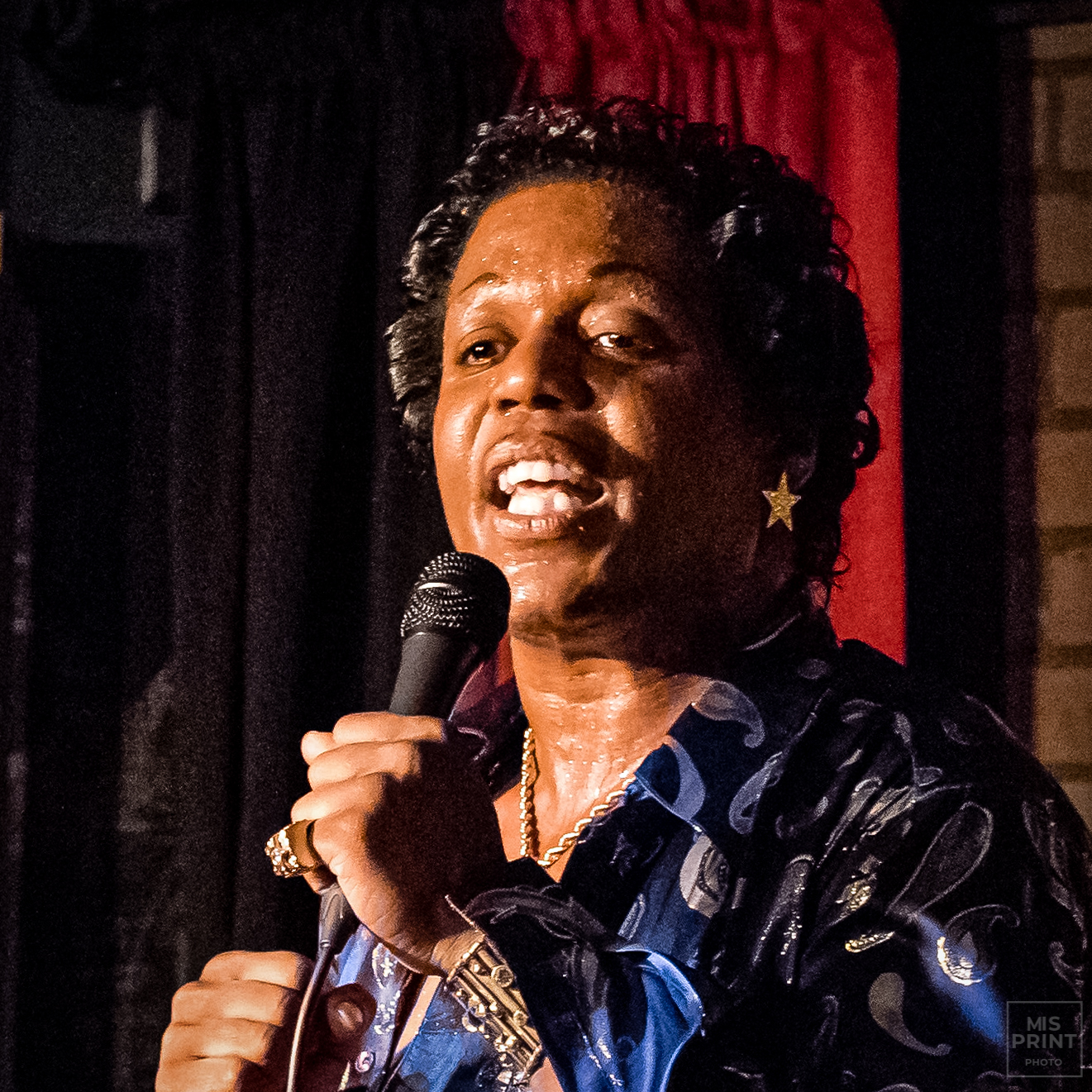
- McCloney in 2018
- Born: Ray McCloney; Claims to be "ageless" or 29; Minneapolis, Minnesota, U.S.
- Occupations: Stand-up comedian, advertising pitchman and producer
- Years active: 1989–present
- Website: fancyray.com

Fancy Ray McCloney is a stand-up comedian and advertising pitchman from Minneapolis, Minnesota. He is known for his flamboyant comic persona, once described as "gleefully narcissistic," blending elements of Little Richard, Muhammad Ali, James Brown, Prince, and a tent-revival preacher. He is known for producing and starring in low-budget TV ads for local businesses in the Twin Cities and markets across the U.S., including a Taco Bell ad aired during the 2016 Super Bowl that played off his status as a "local legend." Rarely breaking character on stage or off, Fancy Ray is a buoyantly self-aggrandizing, larger-than-life personality given to spontaneous poetry (about himself) and mock-boastful proclamations including his oft-repeated characteristic catchphrase "I'm the best-lookin’ man in comedy."

In 2020, he released the career-retrospective stand-up album The Best Lookin' Man in Comedy on Stand Up! Records. Writer/producer Diablo Cody, who wrote the liner notes for the album, calls Fancy Ray a "subversive" and "bombastic character (who) looms large in the collective psyche of the Twin Cities ... a nontraditional, nonconformist guy" whose "shtick is almost like a spell."

== Early life ==
The youngest of four boys from north Minneapolis, McCloney attended Central, Marshall-University and West high schools, graduating from West. As a second-grader, Ray did a ventriloquist act with Rev. Billy Graham's traveling show. His nickname came from his grandfather, William M.L. "Fancy" Wade, a sharp-dressed ladies' man and professional athlete who also introduced McCloney to the music and style of Little Richard, a major influence.

== Career ==
=== Stand-up comedy ===
McCloney's career began in 1984 when he won a lip-sync contest at Minneapolis' First Avenue nightclub impersonating Little Richard, Screamin' Jay Hawkins, and James Brown. This led to spots on the nationally syndicated lip-sync TV show Puttin' on the Hits. He began performing stand-up in 1989, performing locally and opening for Richard Pryor, Little Richard and Chris Rock. Fancy Ray's comic persona includes a flamboyant sexual ambiguity and style of dress, and a theatrical mock-arrogance and vanity once described as "a cross between Little Richard and Ethel Merman" and a "carefully crafted ... naughty alter ego with goofy, winking innocence" that gives him the "ability to soften life’s seedier edges with campy joie de vivre." His penchant for bombastic nicknames also includes "The Human Chocolate Orchid." He has sometimes been disparaged for merely being "famous for being famous," which he acknowledges with the joke "I'm like Paris [Hilton] with a pretty tan."

=== Get Down With It ===
Also in 1989, McCloney debuted a talk show, Get Down With It, on local cable-access Minneapolis Television Network. The show cemented his status as a local celebrity in the Twin Cities, interviewing guests including Ron Jeremy, Bootsy Collins, Whoopi Goldberg, Al Green, Bo Diddley, George Clinton, Carol Channing, Kevin Garnett, and Gloria Steinem. Though focusing on comedy, the show also had a serious side; McCloney interviewed white supremacists during the Los Angeles riots, as well as civil rights activist Spike Moss and (in his final interview) HIV-positive Minneapolis City Council member Brian Coyle. A reviewer for the St. Cloud Times noted that despite his reputation for outrageous self-promotion, "Fancy Ray's true calling is as an interviewer. He's sensitive, prepared and interested in what other people have to say."

=== Television advertising ===
McCloney runs a one-man ad agency, Chocolate Orchid Productions, which produces, writes, edits and stars in television commercials for local businesses in the Twin Cities and other markets including San Jose; Phoenix; Memphis; St. Louis, Missouri; and Jacksonville, Florida. He also appeared in a Taco Bell ad aired during the 2016 Super Bowl that played off his status as a "local legend."

=== Political career ===
In 1998, he ran for governor of Minnesota on the third-party People's Champion ticket, stating that "the whole election was a joke so why not have me, a professional comedian?" Beyond novelty value, he also wanted to be a spokesman for issues affecting blacks and poor people. His running mate was his mother, Toni McCloney. He received 919 votes, losing to Jesse Ventura.

=== The Best Lookin' Man in Comedy ===
On March 27, 2020, McCloney released The Best Lookin' Man in Comedy, on Stand Up! Records. Originally recorded in 2014, the album features highlights from 30 years of his comedy career and liner notes by Diablo Cody. The mayors of both Minneapolis and St. Paul officially proclaimed the date "Fancy Ray McCloney Day" in his honor. McCloney was also named grand marshal of the St. Patrick’s Day parade in Minneapolis, though the parade was canceled due to the COVID-19 pandemic.

=== Other appearances ===
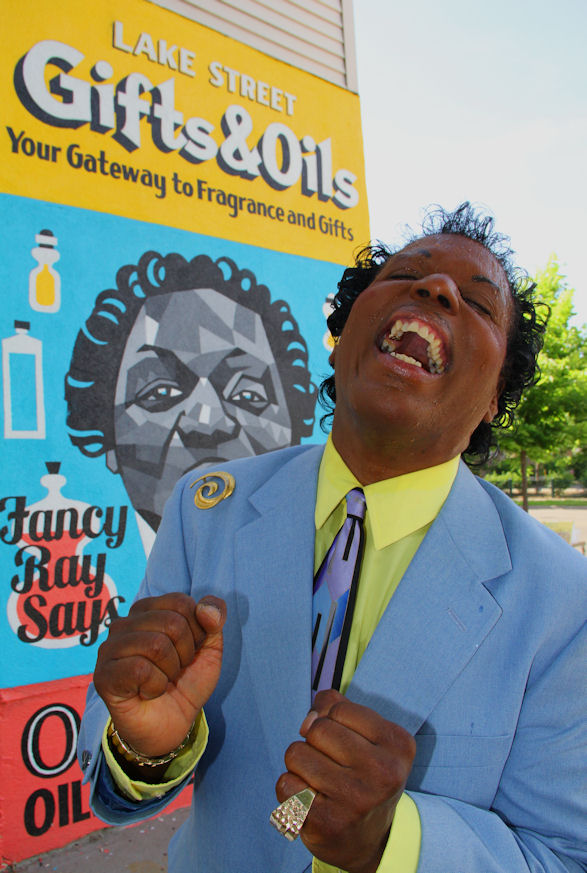
McCloney stands in front of a mural of himself on Lake Street in Minneapolis

Fancy Ray has appeared on a number of nationwide talk shows and reality series, including The Tonight Show, America's Got Talent, Last Comic Standing, Entertainment Tonight, The Maury Povich Show, and The Jenny Jones Show. He moved to Los Angeles in 2003 to establish a Hollywood career, but returned to the Twin Cities in 2008. McCloney appeared in the 2008 direct-to-video comedy The Junkyard Willie Movie: Lost In Transit as "Crazy Revival Preacher." He contributed guest vocals to the 2003 song "Parrots" by indie-rock band Hymie's Basement, and stars in a promotional video for Sleeping in the Aviary's 2010 album You and Me, Ghost, described by the Minnesota Daily as "a tongue-in-cheek homage to all those late night advertisements you’ve probably fallen asleep to once or twice."

He was profiled in a 2019 segment of Twin Cities PBS' Minnesota Original.

His face appears on a mural painted on a building at 2933 E. Lake St. in Minneapolis.

McCloney is an ordained minister in the Universal Life Church and has officiated many weddings.

== Discography ==
- The Best Lookin' Man in Comedy (Stand Up! Records, 2020)
- Fancy Ray’s 20th Anniversary of Comedy (DVD, 2009)

== Personal life ==
McCloney has a son, Trevon.

He claims to be "ageless", and for decades has given his age as between 24 and 29.
