= Isthmus (newspaper) =

American alternative newspaper

- To The Death!
- Type: Alternative newspaper
- Format: Tabloid
- Owner(s): Isthmus Community Media, Inc.
- Publisher: Jason Joyce
- President: Judith Davidoff
- Associate editor: Linda Falkenstein
- Staff writers: Chali Pittman
- Calendar Editor: Bob Koch
- Founded: April 9, 1976
- Headquarters: Madison, Wisconsin, United States
- Circulation: 35,000
- Website: isthmus.com

Isthmus is a free alternative newspaper based in Madison, Wisconsin (US). Founded by Vince O'Hern and Fred Milverstedt in 1976, the paper is published monthly on the first Thursday, with a circulation of 35,000. In 2020 the newspaper became a nonprofit, joining a growing number of local news outlets turning to community support to fund operations. Isthmus offers local news, opinion, sports and coverage of the arts, dining and music scenes.

Isthmus takes its name from the land mass that forms the heart of Madison's downtown and houses the twin engines of the city's economy, the University of Wisconsin—Madison and the Wisconsin State Capitol. The paper was founded by Vincent P. O'Hern and Fred Milverstedt, the latter a Madison area journalist and the former a Madison transplant originally from Detroit. It was O'Hern and Milverstedt who came up with the paper's somewhat ominous original motto, "To the Death," a mantra that, according to O'Hern, "expressed our determination to succeed," though he noted that "no life has been lost in [the paper's] production." Milverstedt served as original editor of Isthmus until leaving the paper in 1980. O'Hern would remain as the paper's publisher, and write a weekly "Making the Paper" column; his wife, Linda Baldwin, also served as associate publisher.

On July 10, 2014, O'Hern announced that he and Baldwin would retire from Isthmus, and that its parent company would be sold to Red Card Media, a Madison-based company known for the Red Card prepaid dining service for UW—Madison students. Red Card's principal ownership includes the trio of Jeff Haupt, Craig Bartlett, and Mark Tauscher. On March 19, 2020, Red Card ceased Isthmus' print publications for the first time in forty years due to the COVID-19 pandemic and laid off the newspaper's entire staff. Isthmus continued to produce content online, notably staff writer Dylan Brogan's coverage of downtown protests and civil unrest following the murder of George Floyd by a Minneapolis police officer and the police shooting of Jacob Blake in Kenosha, WI.

Haupt and Bartlett transferred most of the newspaper's intellectual property to Isthmus Community Media, Inc., a 501(c)(3) nonprofit organization on November 1, 2020. Red Card retained ownership of Beer and Cheese Fest, Paddle and Portage, and other events created under the Isthmus brand.

Dylan Brogan, Judith Davidoff, Linda Falkenstein, and Bob Koch led the transition to a nonprofit model and worked as volunteers for months to save the paper during the height of the COVID-19 outbreak. Jason Joyce, former news editor at The Capital Times and the former digital media editor at Isthmus, was hired as publisher in July 2021. He oversees operations with Davidoff, who serves as editor and president of the board of directors.

Isthmus returned to print on August 5, 2021, after a 17-month hiatus. The paper publishes the first Thursday of the month.

Isthmus, through both its print edition and its website (Isthmus.com), carries investigative and in-depth articles, offers opinions and commentaries on current events, provides incisive coverage of the arts, and features stories on trends and culture in the Madison area. It has won numerous awards for journalistic excellence over the years, including more than three dozen first-place awards from the Milwaukee Press Club and two Golden Quills, the top honor from the International Society of Weekly Newspaper Editors. Isthmus is a member of the Association of Alternative Newsmedia, a North American trade association of alternative newsweeklies.

Notable former freelancers and staffers include arts writer Kent Williams; editor and TV critic Dean Robbins; news editor Bill Lueders, who joined the Wisconsin Center for Investigative Journalism in June 2011 after 25 years at Isthmus and later became the editor of The Progressive; Anne Strainchamps and Steve Paulson from the national syndicated public radio show To The Best Of Knowledge; and former interns Anthony Shadid and Abigail Goldman, who have gone on to win Pulitzer Prizes.

Unusually for an alternative weekly, Isthmus has published overseas reporting, sending a freelancer to Ukraine in 2025 to write about the life of former University of Wisconsin mathematician Stanisław Ulam.

== See also ==
- List of alternative weekly newspapers
