= NCAA Native American mascot decision =

Subsequent to the Native American mascot controversy

In 2005 the National Collegiate Athletic Association (NCAA) distributed a "self evaluation" to its member institutions for teams to examine the use of potentially offensive imagery with their mascot choice. This examination was done in accordance with NCAA policy that requires each member institution to maintain an "atmosphere of respect for and sensitivity to the dignity of every person." Fourteen schools either removed all references to Native American culture or were deemed not to have references to Native American culture as part of their athletics programs. Subsequently, 19 teams were cited as having potentially "hostile or abusive" names, mascots, or images, that would be banned from displaying them during post-season play, and prohibited from hosting tournaments.

== Changes ==
Colleges or universities previously using the nickname Indians or tribal name:

| School | Former nickname | Current nickname |
|---|---|---|
| Arkansas State University | Indians | Red Wolves |
| Carthage College | Redmen | Firebirds |
| Chowan University | Braves | Hawks |
| Dartmouth College | Indians | Big Green |
| Indiana University of Pennsylvania | Indians | Crimson Hawks |
| McMurry University | Indians | War Hawks |
| Miami University | Redskins | RedHawks |
| Midwestern State University | Indians | Mustangs |
| Newberry College | Indians | Wolves |
| Quinnipiac University | Braves | Bobcats |
| Stonehill College | Chiefs | Skyhawks |
| Southeastern Oklahoma State University | Savages | Savage Storm |
| University of Louisiana at Monroe | Indians | Warhawks |
| University of Massachusetts Amherst | Redmen | Minutemen and Minutewomen |
| University of Massachusetts Lowell | Chiefs | River Hawks |
| University of North Dakota | Fighting Sioux | Fighting Hawks |

California State University, Stanislaus eliminated Native American references to their Warrior nickname, initially using a Warrior Hawk mascot which never caught on; it has been replaced by a Roman Warrior, Titus. The College of William and Mary (W&M) had previously changed from "Indians" to The Tribe, but was cited due to two feathers in its logo, which were removed. After a brief period of having the frog-like character Colonel Ebirt as its unofficial mascot, W&M selected the Griffin in 2010. Both Alcorn State University and Bradley University kept the nickname Braves but changed their mascots, while the Chowan University Braves became the Hawks. The Carthage College Redmen became the Red Men and Lady Reds, eventually dropping both nicknames in January 2021 in favor of Firebirds for all teams; and the Southeastern Oklahoma State University Savages changed to Savage Storm.

=== Controversies ===
San Diego State University (SDSU) was not cited by the NCAA in 2005 due to a decision that the Aztecs were not a Native American tribe with any living descendants. An SDSU professor of American Indian Studies states that among other problems the mascot teaches the mistaken idea that the Aztecs were a local tribe rather than living in Mexico 1,000 miles away. However, in February 2017 the SDSU Native American Student Alliance supported removal of the mascot, calling its continued use "institutional racism" in its official statement to the Committee on Diversity, Equity and Outreach. Although that resolution was rejected by the SDSU Associated Students, the University Senate, which represents the administration, faculty, staff and students, voted to phase out the human depiction of the Aztec Warrior. A task force of students, faculty, and alumni studied the issue and recommended keeping the name but modify the mascot performance and certain references used in other contexts. However, there are few signs of this recommendation being implemented.

The University of Illinois Urbana-Champaign (UIUC) kept the Fighting Illini nickname as referring to the state, not Native Americans, but officially stopped using the Chief Illiniwek image and mascot in 2007, although an attachment remains among many students and alumni; but not all. The "Honor the Chief Society" filed an application with the U.S. Patent and Trademark Office in 2009 to register the Chief Illiniwek symbol, which the university opposed. In October 2013, an agreement was reached that would allow for the limited private use of the name as long as it was accompanied by a disclaimer stating that the university is not involved in such use. A new Chief Illiniwek cannot be named, and the university retains control of the name. However, an "unofficial" chief has been selected by former Chief Illiniwek portrayers. An effort to resolve the controversy by then-chancellor Robert J. Jones included the work of a committee that issued a report of its "critical conversations" that included over 600 participants representing all sides, which remained sharply divided. Jones then appointed a Commission on Native Imagery: Healing and Reconciliation to implement the recommendations of the committee. A non-binding resolution to make "Alma Otter" the official mascot was placed on the spring 2019 student election ballot, but failed to receive a majority. However, some saw the vote as a sign of progress. In 2020 the belted kingfisher, which is blue and orange, the UIUC colors, received a majority of student votes. The vote was advisory, with the university making the official decision. In September 2020, the University Senate overwhelmingly endorsed the Kingfisher as the new mascot, voting 105 to 2 with 4 abstaining. The mascot has won subsequent student votes, however the university has taken no action.

The University of North Dakota challenged the NCAA policy in court and settled in 2007 when it was given three years to obtain consent from the Sioux tribes in the state. When one tribe refused permission, the state Board of Higher Education proceeded with plans to eliminate the Fighting Sioux name and logo. In 2011, the State Legislature voted that the university should retain the name but in a 2012 referendum the voters decided to proceed with the change, which has been completed but no alternative nickname or logo has been selected. The NCAA has agreed to allow some of the logos to remain in the sports stadiums, while removing the larger and more obvious ones. Additional legal cases have run their course, leaving the Fighting Sioux name and logo officially retired. The 2012 referendum specified that there would be a cooling off period during which a new nickname would not be selected, which ended on January 1, 2015. After a year-long selection process, "Fighting Hawks" was selected as the new nickname on November 18, 2015. Fighting Hawks merchandise is sold, but many fans, particularly at hockey games, continue to wear "Sioux" jerseys.

== Waivers granted ==
The NCAA has granted waivers from their mascot policy to five university teams originally on the "hostile and abusive" list that obtained official support from individual tribes for the use of their names and images, based upon the principle of Tribal Sovereignty. As stated by the NCAI: "In general, NCAI strongly opposes the use of derogatory Native sports mascots. However, in the case where mascots refer to a particular Native nation or nations, NCAI respects the right of individual tribal nations to work with universities and athletic programs to decide how to protect and celebrate their respective tribal heritage."

- Catawba College Indians became the Catawba Indians with approval of that tribe.
- Central Michigan University (Chippewas) – The Saginaw Chippewa Tribal Nation of Michigan gave its support to the nickname.
- Florida State University (Seminoles): The name Seminoles was selected by student vote in the 1940s, and for the first two decades the athletic teams mostly used images based on stereotypes such as in Hollywood Westerns. Leaders of the Seminole Tribe of Florida who attended a basketball game on the campus in 1972 expressed their concerns to university officials regarding the antics of such mascots as Sammy Seminole and Chief Fullabull which were retired that year. 1978 marked the first appearance of Osceola and Renegade, in which a student portrays the 19th-century Seminole leader Osceola, riding Renegade, an Appaloosa horse. The student, chosen for his horsemanship, wears clothing provided by the Seminole tribe but is not necessarily of Native American descent himself. The Seminole Tribe of Florida officially sanctions the use of the Seminole as Florida State University's nickname and of Osceola as FSU's symbol. Max Osceola, the chief and general council president of the Seminole Tribe of Florida, has stated that he regards it as an "honor" to be associated with the university. However, the Seminole Tribe of Florida is only one of the tribal authorities representing Seminoles. Some members of the much larger Seminole Nation of Oklahoma objected to the use of the name and imagery, leading to the NCAA originally placed FSU on the list of colleges using imagery "hostile or abusive" towards Native Americans. However, in July 2005, the Seminole Nation General Council, the legislative body for the Seminole Nation of Oklahoma, voted 18–2 not to oppose the use of Native American names and mascots by college sports teams. One opponent is David Narcomey who has referred to Osceola as a "minstrel show." The relationship between the Florida tribe and the university has been maintained to the present. In addition to Osceola, there are the FSU traditions of the "tomahawk chop" and "war chant", which have more controversial associations.
- Mississippi College (Choctaws) received the support of the Mississippi Band of Choctaw Indians to keep their name, but retired their mascot, Chief Choc.
- University of Utah (Utes) – For many decades, the school did not have an official Western Athletic Conference mascot. As early as the 1950s, the University of Utah created a Ute Indian boy, named "Hoyo", as its mascot. The University of Utah club organizations, such as the Associated Students of the University of Utah, the University of Utah Alumni Association, the Daily Chronicle, and many other social organizations highly celebrated "Hoyo" at homecoming events, before and after football games events, and at other social events for many years. Prior to 1972, teams used both "Utes" and "Redskins" as nicknames, but dropped the latter in response to tribal concerns. In 1996 Swoop, a red tailed hawk, became the official mascot. Even though Swoop is now the University of Utah's official mascot, Utah fans and its clubs alike still use "Utes" as their nickname at sporting events. (Note: Except for the women's gymnastics team, which is known as the Red Rocks.) This is done with permission from the Ute Tribal Council. In a 2020 renewal of the agreement, the university will be required to include information regarding the Ute tribe in the orientation of incoming students.

== See also ==
- List of college sports team names and mascots derived from the indigenous peoples of North America
