= List of college sports team names and mascots derived from Indigenous peoples =

The use of terms and images referring to Native Americans/First Nations as the name or mascot for a sports team is a topic of public controversy in the United States and in Canada. The documents most often cited to justify the trend for change are an advisory opinion by the United States Commission on Civil Rights in 2001 and a resolution by the American Psychological Association in 2005. Both support the views of Native American organizations and individuals that such mascots maintain harmful stereotypes that are discriminatory and cause harm by distorting the past and preventing understanding of Native American/First Nations peoples in the present. Such practices are seen as particularly harmful in schools and universities, which have the stated purpose of promoting ethnic diversity and inclusion. This view lead to the NCAA adopting a policy to eliminate "hostile and abusive" names and mascots. However some changes began in the 1970s in response to the Native American civil rights movement, led by the National Congress of American Indians.

Defenders of the current usage often state their intention to honor Native Americans by referring to positive traits, such as fighting spirit and being aggressive, brave, stoic, dedicated, and proud; while opponents see these traits as being based upon stereotypes of Native Americans as savages. Supporters also claim that the issue is not important, being only about sports, and that the opposition is nothing more than "political correctness", which change advocates argue ignores the extensive evidence of harmful effects of stereotypes and bias. These advocates ignore other, non-Indian tribal names, such as ‘Vikings’.

== Canada ==
The Department of Educational Foundations at the University of Saskatchewan passed a resolution calling for the retirement of all school mascots and logos that depict First Nations people.

There was debate at McGill University in the 2010s over the use of the name "Redmen" for men's varsity sports teams, which alumni say originated as a reference to the school colors and the Celtic heritage of its founder before late becoming associated with First Nation's names and imagery which were removed from use in the 1990s. (The women's teams, though by the 2010s long since re-dubbed "Marlets", had previously been known as the "Squaws".) Others, including indigenous students and Washington State University professor C. Richard King, argue that the name itself is generally used as a disparaging term for indigenous peoples, reinforcing stereotypes and white settler culture. McGill principal and vice chancellor Suzanne Fortier announced that the university would refer to its men's teams as "the McGill teams" during the 2019–20 academic year while deciding on a new name. Since 2020–21, McGill men's teams have been known as the "Redbirds", while women's sports programs continue to use the name "Martlets", which was not the subject of controversy.

Seneca College in Toronto, Ontario changed from the Braves to "The Sting" in 2000.

== Mexico ==
Aztecas UDLAP ("Aztecs") is the name of the sports teams that represent the Universidad de las Américas Puebla (UDLAP).

== Philippines ==
The varsity teams of Arellano University, the Arellano Chiefs was ostensibly named after Cayetano Arellano, the first Chief Justice of the Philippines; its varsity teams were previously known as the "Flaming Arrows" until 2006. Its logo depicts a native American. Its high school teams are called the "Arellano Braves".

The San Beda Little Indians during a halftime performance at the Araneta Coliseum in 2006.

The varsity teams of San Beda University, the San Beda Red Lions, has its Indian Yell cheer, complete with schoolchildren cheerleaders in Indian face paint, costume and war bonnet.

== United States ==
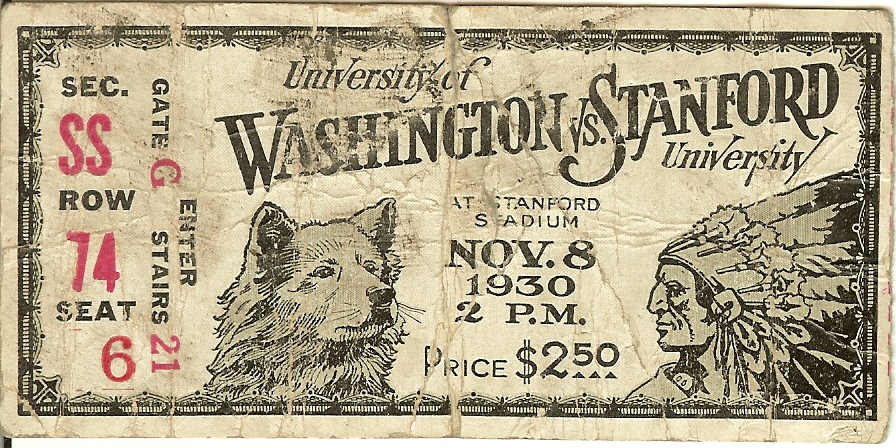
1930 Football ticket stub depicting the former Stanford Indian mascot

=== NCAA policy ===
In 2005 the National Collegiate Athletic Association (NCAA) distributed a "self evaluation" to 31 colleges for teams to examine the use of potentially offensive imagery with their mascot choice. Subsequently, 19 teams were cited as having potentially "hostile or abusive" names, mascots, or images, that would be banned from displaying them during post-season play, and prohibited from hosting tournaments.

Schools that removed all references to Native American culture or were deemed not to have references to Native American culture as part of their athletics programs:

- Alcorn State University – Lorman, Mississippi (Braves) - Logo is a large A, mascot is the "Bravehawk".
- Lycoming College (Warriors)
- Eastern Connecticut State University (Warriors)
- East Stroudsburg University of Pennsylvania (Warriors)
- Merrimack College (Warriors)
- University of North Carolina at Pembroke (Braves) – The university was initially founded to educate American Indians, and since its creation has had close ties to the local Lumbee tribe.
- University of Hawaiʻi at Mānoa – (Hawaiʻi Rainbow Warriors and Rainbow Wahine) From 2000 through 2013, each team was allowed to select its own nickname; most notably, the football team was simply known as "The Warriors". In 2013, the school adopted the identity of "Rainbow Warriors" for all men's teams, while women's teams remain "Rainbow Wahine".
- Wisconsin Lutheran College (Warriors)

Schools granted waivers to retain their nicknames after gaining support from those respective tribes:

- Catawba College - Salisbury, North Carolina (Catawba Indians)
- Central Michigan University – Mount Pleasant, Michigan (Chippewas)
- Florida State University – Tallahassee, Florida (Seminoles) - the mascot is Osceola and Renegade and FSU originated the Tomahawk chop performed by fans at games.
- Mississippi Christian University, formerly Mississippi College – Clinton, Mississippi (Choctaws)
- University of Utah – Salt Lake City, Utah (Utes) Prior to 1972, the Utah teams had informally been known as the Redskins as well as the Utes.

The NCAA did not cite San Diego State University, San Diego, California as "hostile and abusive" due to the Aztec people having no modern representatives. A SDSU professor of American Indian Studies states that the mascot teaches the mistaken idea that Aztecs were a local tribe rather than living in Mexico 1,000 miles from San Diego. In April 2017, the university's Associated Students council rejected a resolution to retire the mascot introduced by the Native American Student Association. In May 2021, the San Diego State University Senate passed a resolution to replace the Aztec Warrior mascot image and to create an advisory council to choose a new mascot consistent with local Kumeyaay traditional narratives.

=== Other current usage (non-NCAA) ===
- Bacone College, Muskogee, Oklahoma (Warriors) – Founded as a Cherokee Baptist Mission school and retains a connection to several tribes.
- Cochise College, Douglas, Arizona (Apaches) – Community College
- Diné College, Tsaile, Arizona (Warriors) – Tribal college
- Haskell Indian Nations University, Lawrence, Kansas (Fighting Indians) – Tribal university
- Lewis–Clark State College, Lewiston, Idaho (Warriors) – Logo features Lewis and Clark, use of Warriors nickname deemed respectful by Tribal leaders.
- Ottawa University, Ottawa, Kansas (Braves) – Affiliated with the Ottawa Tribe of Oklahoma
- Tyler Junior College, Tyler, Texas (Apaches)
- University of South Carolina Salkehatchie (Indians)

=== Prior usage ===
- Carlisle Indians, a school for American Indians that was a college football power in the early 1900s
- University of Oklahoma mascot: Little Red

| Old Name | School | City, State | Year Changed | New Name | Notes |
|---|---|---|---|---|---|
| Apaches | Illinois Valley Community College | Oglesby, Illinois | 2001 | Eagles | |
| Apaches | Southwestern College | Chula Vista, California | 2001 | Jaguars | Community College |
| Beothuk | Memorial University of Newfoundland | St. John's, Newfoundland and Labrador, Canada | 1987 | Sea-Hawks | The Beothuk aboriginal peoples became extinct in 1829 and the university deemed the use of the Beothuk name to be offensive |
| Braves | Bradley University | Peoria, Illinois | 2005 | | While the nickname has never changed, all Native American imagery has been removed. The logo is now a block B and the mascot is a gargoyle. |
| Braves | Chowan University | Murfreesboro, North Carolina | 2006 | Hawks | |
| Braves | Husson College | Bangor, Maine | 2004 | Eagles | |
| Braves | University of West Georgia | Carrollton, Georgia | 2006 | Wolves | |
| Braves | Quinnipiac University | Hamden, Connecticut | 2002 | Bobcats | |
| Brown Indians/Squaws | St. Bonaventure University | Allegany, New York | 1992 | Bonnies | |
| Chief Ouabache | Indiana State University | Terre Haute, Indiana | 1989 | Sycamores | The team name was always the Sycamores; Chief Ouabache and "Indian Princess" were the on-field mascots from 1969 to 1989. |
| Chiefs | Oklahoma City University | Oklahoma City, Oklahoma | 1998 | Stars | |
| Chiefs | Springfield College | Springfield, Massachusetts | 1995 | Pride | Change was made voluntarily without protest on either side. |
| Chiefs | University of Massachusetts Lowell | Lowell, Massachusetts | 1991 | River Hawks | Change occurred with merger of University of Lowell into the UMass system |
| Chieftains | Seattle University | Seattle, Washington | 2000 | Redhawks | "H" is uncapitalized here, unlike Miami's nickname. |
| Chieftains | Stonehill College | Easton, Massachusetts | 2005 | Skyhawks | In late 2002, The Strategic Planning Committee of Stonehill College determined that the mascot was disrespectful to American Indians and decided that it would be changed. After discussion, the mascot was changed to the Skyhawk in 2005. |
| Fighting Sioux | University of North Dakota | Grand Forks, North Dakota | 2012 | Fighting Hawks | The "Fighting Sioux" nickname was retired in 2012, but the state passed a law prohibiting the university from adopting a new nickname until January 2015. In November of that year, following two rounds of fan voting, the current nickname of Fighting Hawks was chosen and immediately adopted. For more information, see North Dakota Fighting Sioux controversy. |
| Hurons | Eastern Michigan University | Ypsilanti, Michigan | 1991 | Eagles (The mascot is "Swoop") | The change remained controversial as some students and alumni sought to restore it. In 2012, the university president brought back the Hurons logo, which was placed inside a flap of the band uniforms, along with another historic logo, with the stated intent of recognizing the past. However, the return of the Hurons logo has prompted protests from Native Americans at the university and in the local community, who state that the old mascot promotes stereotypes and hostility. |
| Indians | Adams State University | Alamosa, Colorado | 1997 | Grizzlies | |
| Indians | Arkansas State University | Jonesboro, Arkansas | 2008 | Red Wolves | |
| Indians | University of Wisconsin–La Crosse | La Crosse, Wisconsin | 1989 | Eagles | |
| Indians | University of the Cumberlands | Williamsburg, Kentucky | 2002 | Patriots | Originally Cumberland College, name changed 2005 |
| Indians | Dartmouth College | Hanover, New Hampshire | 1974 | Big Green | Indians was not official, and the current "unofficial" mascot is Keggy the Keg. |
| Indians | Juniata College | Huntingdon, Pennsylvania | 1994 | Eagles | |
| Indians | Midwestern State University | Wichita Falls, Texas | 2006 | Mustangs | |
| Indians | Martin Methodist College | Pulaski, Tennessee | 2002 | Firehawks | |
| Indians | McMurry University | Abilene, Texas | 2006 | War Hawks | |
| Indians | Minnesota State University, Mankato | Mankato, Minnesota | 1977 | Mavericks | |
| Indians | Montclair State University | Montclair, New Jersey | 1989 | Red Hawks | |
| Indians | University of Nebraska Omaha | Omaha, Nebraska | 1971 | Mavericks | |
| Indians | University of Louisiana at Monroe | Monroe, Louisiana | 2006 | Warhawks | "Chief Brave Spirit" mascot also retired |
| Indians | Indiana University of Pennsylvania | Indiana County, Pennsylvania | 2007 | Crimson Hawks | |
| Indians | Newberry College | Newberry, South Carolina | 2008 | Wolves | |
| Indians | University of Southern Colorado | Pueblo, Colorado | 1995 | ThunderWolves | |
| Indians | Stanford University | Stanford, California | 1972 | Cardinal | Stanford had the "Indian" as its mascot from 1930 to 1972. In 1981 the "Cardinal" was selected to honor the university athletic team color. The symbol of the Stanford Band is the "Stanford Tree." |
| Indians | Siena College | Loudonville, New York | 1988 | Saints | |
| Indians | College of William & Mary | Williamsburg, Virginia | 1978 | Tribe | Mascot is the Griffin |
| Indians | Yakima Valley Community College | Yakima, Washington | 1998 | Yaks | |
| Indians and Otahkians | Southeast Missouri State University | Cape Girardeau, Missouri | 2004 | Redhawks | |
| Indiens | Collège Ahuntsic | Montreal, Quebec, Canada | 2019 | Aigles (Eagles) | |
| Maroon Chiefs | Morningside College | Sioux City, Iowa | 1998 | Mustangs | |
| Moccasins | University of Tennessee at Chattanooga | Chattanooga, Tennessee | 1996 | Mocs | "Scrappy the Mockingbird" in honor of coach Andy Moore. Prior mascot was Chief Moccanooga. |
| Mohawks | Massachusetts College of Liberal Arts | North Adams, Massachusetts | 2002 | Trailblazers | |
| Old Siwash | Knox College | Galesburg, Illinois | 1994 | Prairie Fire | Mascot is the Fox |
| Plainsmen | Nebraska Wesleyan University | Lincoln, Nebraska | 2000 | Prairie Wolves | |
| Red Raiders | Colgate University | Hamilton, New York | 2001 | Raiders | |
| Red Raiders | Southern Oregon University | Ashland, Oregon | 1980 | Raiders/Red-Tailed Hawk | |
| Red Men/Lady Reds | Carthage College | Kenosha, Wisconsin | 2005 | Firebirds | In 2020, Carthage's board of trustees unanimously voted to retire the name Red Men/Lady Reds and the mascot "Torchie" from Carthage athletics and will compete as Carthage Athletics during the 2020–21 academic year. A new team name and mascot will be approved and announced prior to the 2021–22 academic year. |
| Redmen | University of Massachusetts Amherst (UMass) | Amherst, Massachusetts | 1972 | Minutemen and Minutewomen | According to the University Redmen referred to the color of uniforms worn by the athletics teams |
| Redmen | Northeastern State University | Tahlequah, Oklahoma | 2006 | RiverHawks | Founded as the Cherokee National Female Seminary. T-shirts with the old "Redman" mascot continue to be sold. |
| Redmen | Ripon College | Ripon, Wisconsin | 1992 | Red Hawks | Initially changed to "The Red" for two years before changing to the current name in 1994. |
| Redmen | St. John's University | New York City | 1995 | Red Storm | Although the school's website indicated that the name did not originally refer to American Indians, but to the school color; some athletics logos used an Indian character as late as the 1980s. The university was pressured to change by American Indian groups who considered Redmen a slur. |
| Redmen and Lady Reds | Simpson College | Indianola, Iowa | 1992 | The Storm | |
| Redmen and Redwomen | University of Rio Grande | Rio Grande, Ohio | 2008 | RedStorm | |
| Redskins | Miami University | Oxford, Ohio | 1997 | RedHawks | The university began discussions regarding the propriety of the Redskins name and images in 1972, and changed its team nickname to the RedHawks in 1996. |
| Redskins | Southern Nazarene University | Bethany, Oklahoma | 1998 | Crimson Storm | |
| Savages | Dickinson State University | Dickinson, North Dakota | 1972 | Blue Hawks | |
| Savages | Eastern Washington University | Cheney, Washington | 1973 | Eagles | |
| Savages | Southeastern Oklahoma State University | Durant, Oklahoma | 2006 | Savage Storm | |
| Warrior | Syracuse University | Syracuse, New York | 1978 | Otto the Orange | The "Saltine Warrior" represented Syracuse from 1931 until 1978. After a brief attempt to use a Roman warrior mascot, Otto the Orange was introduced in 1980 and became official in 1990. |
| Warriors | Hartwick College | Oneonta, New York | 1994 | Hawks | |
| Warriors | Marquette University | Milwaukee, Wisconsin | 1994 | Golden Eagles | Marquette retired the mascot "Willie Wampum" in 1971, and changed their team name from the Warriors to the Golden Eagles in 1994. The school's president stated: "We live in a different era than when the Warriors nickname was selected in 1954. The perspective of time has shown us that our actions, intended or not, can offend others. We must not knowingly act in a way that others will believe, based on their experience, to be an attack on their dignity as fellow human beings." |
| Zias | Eastern New Mexico University | Portales, New Mexico | 2015 | Greyhounds | The women's teams are reverting to the name used prior to the 1970s, which is the same as the men's teams. |

== See also ==
- List of Indigenous peoples
- List of contemporary ethnic groups
