= Ed Schafer =

29th United States Secretary of Agriculture

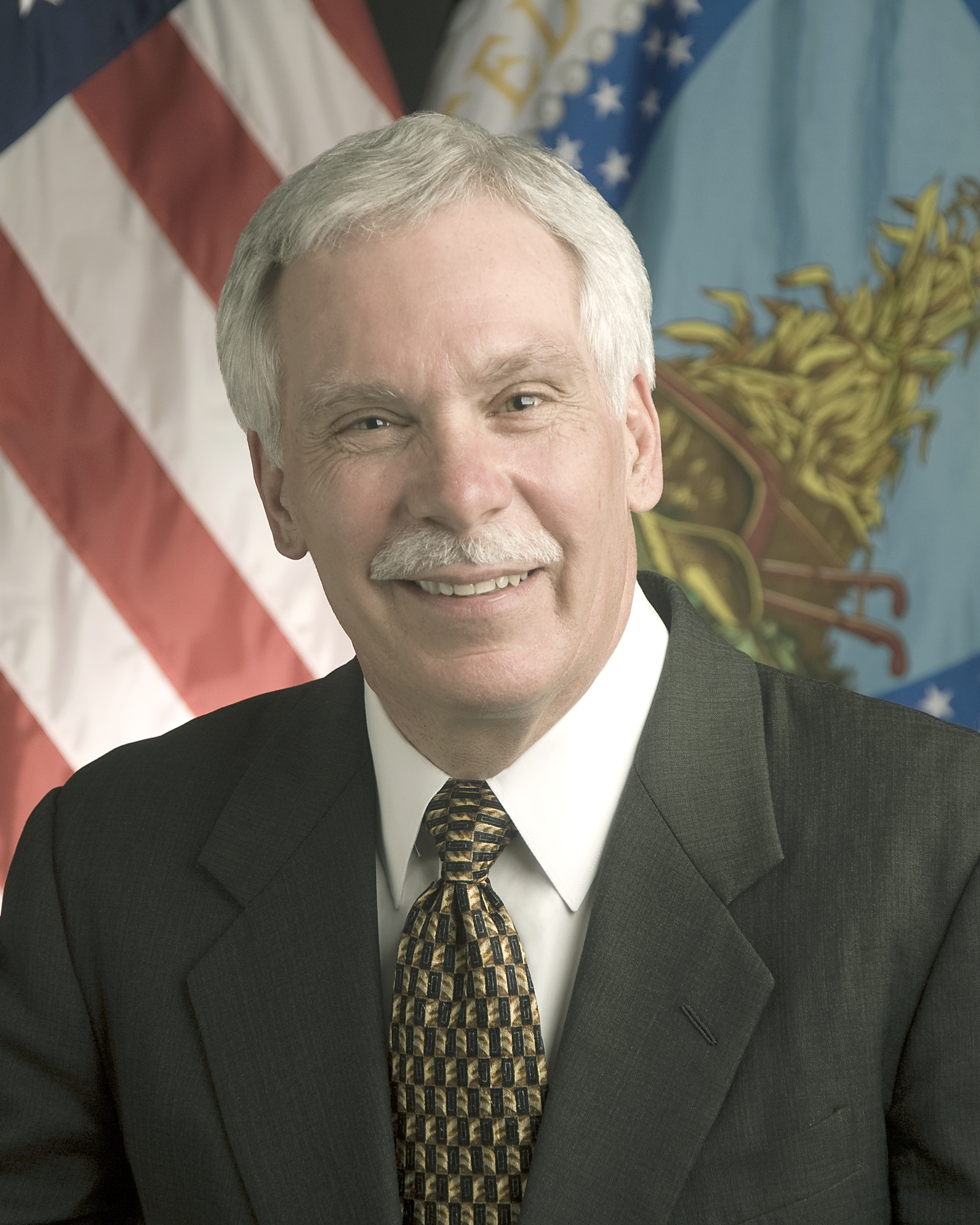
- Official portrait, 2008

President of the University of North Dakota
- Acting
- In office January 14, 2016 – July 1, 2016
- Preceded by: Robert Kelley
- Succeeded by: Mark Kennedy

29th United States Secretary of Agriculture
- In office January 28, 2008 – January 20, 2009
- President: George W. Bush
- Preceded by: Mike Johanns
- Succeeded by: Tom Vilsack

30th Governor of North Dakota
- In office December 15, 1992 – December 15, 2000
- Lieutenant: Rosemarie Myrdal
- Preceded by: George A. Sinner
- Succeeded by: John Hoeven

Personal details
- Born: Edward Thomas Schafer; August 8, 1946 (age 80) Bismarck, North Dakota, U.S.
- Party: Republican
- Spouse: Nancy Jones
- Children: 4, including 2 stepchildren
- Education: University of North Dakota (BA); University of Denver (MBA)

Edward Thomas Schafer (born August 8, 1946) is an American businessman and politician who served as the 30th governor of North Dakota from 1992 to 2000 and as the 29th United States secretary of agriculture from 2008 to 2009 under President George W. Bush. From January to July 2016 he served as interim president of the University of North Dakota.

== Early life, education, and family ==
Schafer was born and raised in Bismarck, North Dakota, and is the son of Marian Nelsen and businessman Harold Schafer. He is of German descent. He has one sister, Pamela (Pam).

Schafer attended the University of North Dakota, where he earned a bachelor's degree in 1969. There he became a member of Sigma Nu fraternity. He earned an M.B.A. degree from the University of Denver in 1970.

Schafer is married to Nancy Jones. They have two children: Thomas "Tom" Schafer and Ellie Schafer. Schafer has two stepchildren: Eric Jones and Kari (Jones) Hammer.

His sister, Pam Schafer, was the first wife of former Democratic-NPL U.S. Senator Kent Conrad.

== Gold Seal Company ==
Schafer took a full-time job after graduation with his family's firm, the Gold Seal Company. Gold Seal was a North Dakota-based manufacturing company founded by his father, Harold Schafer, in 1942.

Gold Seal was the distributor of "Mr. Bubble" bubble bath, "Glass Wax" glass cleaner and "Snowy Bleach".

Ed Schafer rose through the ranks at Gold Seal, working in several divisions of the company until serving as company president from 1978 to 1985. At its height, Gold Seal generated more than $50 million in annual revenues, making it one of North Dakota's largest privately held firms.

== Junkyard Wars ==
Schafer has long had an interest in building machinery and equipment from used scrap materials. He was selected as a contestant on the Discovery Channel's engineering game show Junkyard Wars. His team worked to build a machine from junked components.

In 2003, Schafer competed during the show's fifth season, when he also served as the captain of the "High Flyers" team. His team took second place in the competition, losing to the "Jet Doctors" in the season finale.

== Governor of North Dakota ==
Schafer was elected twice as the 30th governor of North Dakota, holding office from 1992 to 2000. He is a Republican and a self-styled conservative.

In 1990, Schafer unsuccessfully challenged then-U.S. Congressman Byron Dorgan as Dorgan ran for reelection. Schafer captured 35% of the vote to Dorgan's 65%. He entered the 1992 North Dakota gubernatorial campaign as the Republican nominee. He and Republican lieutenant governor nominee Rosemarie Myrdal defeated the Democratic nominee for governor, former North Dakota Attorney General Nicholas Spaeth, and the Democratic nominee for lieutenant governor, Julie Hill. Schafer and Myrdal captured nearly 58% of the vote, to 41% for Spaeth and Hill.

When Schafer became governor, North Dakota was facing major budgetary and financial hurdles. This continued, on and off, throughout his two terms. "As governor, Schafer had to deal with budget crunches during his eight years as state budget maker in the Capitol," according to the Bismarck Tribune.

While governor, Schafer oversaw annual state budgets that exceeded $4.5 billion and a state employee workforce of more than 12,000.

Schafer prioritized the expansion and diversification of North Dakota's economy. For example, he worked with the private sector to expand the production and distribution of value-added agricultural products such as corn sweeteners and pasta.

During his time in office, he helped to build a closer trading relationship with China in concert with other North Dakota government officials, federal government trade specialists and private sector business leaders. These efforts assisted in the development of China into a primary export market for North Dakota's products and services in the 1990s.

As governor during the rise of the global internet and its introduction to broader society, Schafer realized the need for internet access across North Dakota. He worked with both government and business leaders, implementing various efforts "to upgrade North Dakota's communications infrastructure and make high-speed voice and data networks available to farmers, ranchers and rural businesses", and to individual households.

In 1995 Schafer served as Chair of the Midwestern Governors Association.

When Schafer ran for reelection in 1996, he and Myrdal defeated Lee Kaldor, the Democratic gubernatorial nominee, and Barbara Pyle, the Democratic nominee for lieutenant governor. Schafer and Myrdal received about two-thirds of the vote.

Schafer's long-held interest in conservation led him to help arrange the U.S. Forest Service's May 2007 purchase of the 5,200-acre Elkhorn Ranch in North Dakota. The Elkhorn Ranch was established by former United States president Theodore Roosevelt as his main working ranch in the North Dakota Badlands, and is now protected as a unit of the Theodore Roosevelt National Park.

In 1999–2000 Schafer served as chair of the Republican Governors Association. He did not seek reelection as governor in 2000.

== Work life and political activities in the 2000s ==
Schafer was co-founder and CEO of Extend America, a start-up wireless communications company he founded after leaving office as governor.

In 2002, he was appointed as civilian aide to the United States Secretary of the Army.

He was a frequent guest host of the Hot Talk radio program on WDAY-AM in Fargo, North Dakota.

Before his appointment as Secretary of Agriculture, Schafer served as an advisor and occasional spokesperson for the North Dakota chapter of Americans for Prosperity, a conservative advocacy group backed by the Koch Brothers.

He became a supporter of the North Dakota Taxpayers' Association, serving as an advisor and a keynote speaker.

== U.S. Secretary of Agriculture ==
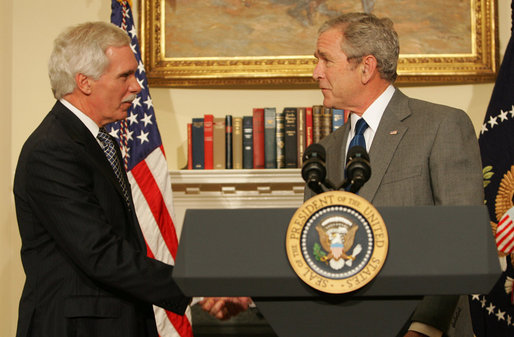
Schafer shaking hands with President George W. Bush on October 31, 2007

In October 2007, Schafer was nominated by then-President George W. Bush to be the next Secretary of Agriculture.

Schafer had wide support in the Senate. His hearing was originally scheduled for January 30, 2008, but was moved up by request of North Dakota Senator Kent Conrad so that Schafer could attend the State of the Union address as a cabinet member. That confirmation hearing was held on January 24, with senators asking Schafer questions on various topics such as US beef exports to Japan and South Korea, the Department of Agriculture's ability to deliver on programs passed by Congress, policy on sugar, and cotton prices. On January 28 he was unanimously confirmed by the Senate. Later that day, as Secretary of Agriculture, Schafer attended the State of the Union Address with other members of the President's cabinet.

Schafer was in office for less than two days when a major scandal erupted concerning animal cruelty and unsafe food practices by Hallmark/Westland Meat Packing Company, the nation's second-largest supplier of ground beef to the National School Lunch Program, which is administered by the Department of Agriculture.

This led to the largest recall of meat in the history of the United States. The issues of how best to handle the problems of unsafe food practices and animal cruelty by USDA-inspected meat processing plants became a major focus of Schafer's administration.

The Humane Society of the United States received video showing multiple instances of workers abusing and torturing cattle who had fallen and were unable to walk into kill pens on their own, videographed in October and November 2007. The Humane Society and many meat animal experts, ethicists and nutritionists objected to the use of downer cattle, or non-ambulatory cattle for human food, because of health, food safety, and because the cruelty showed ethical lapses on Hallmark's part in overseeing its employees' behavior.

The company recalled massive quantities of beef and voluntarily shut down the plant where the videos were taken. According to the Cattlemen's Beef Promotions Board, "The 143 million pound recall of beef from Hallmark/Westland Meat Packing Company triggered significant coverage and renewed skepticism about the safety of the nation's beef supply and the competency of the U.S. Department of Agriculture (USDA)."

At issue for USDA, under Schafer, and the Senate was whether these sick, injured and/or aged non-ambulatory cattle were safe for humans to eat.

In his February 28, 2008, testimony before the U.S. Senate Appropriations Subcommittee on Agriculture, Rural Development, Food and Drug Administration, and Related Agencies, Schafer said he "would not endorse an outright ban on 'downer' cows entering the food supply or back stiffer penalties for regulatory violations by meat-processing plants in the wake of the largest beef recall in the nation's history."

Specifically, "the penalties are strong and swift, as we have shown," Schafer said. "Financially, I don't see how this company can survive. People need to be responsible and, from USDA's standpoint, they will be held responsible. . . . They broke the rules. That does not mean the rules are wrong. I believe the rules are adequate."

Under Schafer's leadership, the Agriculture Department promised to improve animal welfare and human food safety. On August 27, 2008, the USDA announced a proposed change in the rule regarding the treatment and handling of downer cattle. In a reversal of his February testimony to the Senate, Schafer said that "to maintain consumer confidence in the food supply, eliminate further misunderstanding of the rule and, ultimately, to make a positive impact on the humane handling of cattle, I believe it is sound policy to simplify this matter by initiating a complete ban on the slaughter of downer cattle." As Schafer had predicted in his February 2008 testimony, Hallmark/Westland Meat Packing Company subsequently went out of business.

Based in part on the initial work USDA personnel did during Schafer's tenure as Agriculture Secretary, the U.S. government sued Hallmark/Westland for farm animal cruelty (to downer cattle), misrepresentation and fraud, winning a massive final judgment of $497 million.

This was the largest judgment ever entered for agriculture-related fraud and farm animal cruelty in federal court history. In this first-of-its-kind fraud case, the United States Department of Justice, at the USDA's behest, joined a lawsuit with the Humane Society against Hallmark. The lawsuit alleged that the Hallmark defrauded the federal government by misrepresenting its compliance with the terms of its federal school lunch program contracts requiring the humane handling of animals.

Most of the $497 million judgment was not recovered by the Justice Department because of Hallmark's bankruptcy and cessation of business. The amount was reduced to $155 million as part of the final settlement with the remaining defendants. Part of the judgment amount was paid personally by company executives and members of the Hallmark family in structured settlements.

The Justice and Agriculture Departments intended these huge judgments and settlements in the government's favor to deter future animal cruelty and fraud by the nation's slaughterhouses.

Schafer left the Secretary of Agriculture position at the end of the Bush administration in January 2009.

== Interim president of the University of North Dakota ==
Schafer was appointed interim president of the University of North Dakota on November 9, 2016, by the Board of Higher Education. He said he had no intention to apply to become the next permanent president. Schafer signed a contract on December 2, 2015, to fill in for former University of North Dakota president Robert Kelley upon Kelley's retirement, which took place on January 14, 2016. Schafer reportedly accepted the interim post with "some hesitancy".

Schafer's appointment as interim president "did not sit well with a significant portion of the university faculty, according to the faculty representative on the Board of Higher Education." This lack of support by that portion of the university faculty was in large part because Schafer did not have an earned doctorate or any administrative experience at a research university, according to Eric Murphy, the advisor to the North Dakota State Board of Higher Education. "The faculty voice is in opposition to" Schafer's selection, Murphy said. Schafer's working life was spent primarily in business and politics.

Despite his lack of academic leadership experience, Schafer became the highest-paid administrator in the state's entire higher education system history to that time. He was paid $33,216 per month for his work from January 15 to June 30, 2016. Schafer's contract paid him $2,250 per month more than retiring President Kelley had been earning after more than seven years in that position.

Among the tasks Schafer inherited was overseeing the final stages of the Fighting Sioux naming issue that erupted over objections by various tribes, ethnic groups, and First Nation peoples identifying as Sioux, as well as many other groups and thought leaders, because of the University's use of the Sioux name for its sports teams. On Schafer's first day as interim president, the University's Graphic Identity RFP Evaluation and Recommendation Team met to begin reviewing the 16 proposals from design firms for a new logo design for the Fighting Hawks. Five months later, near the end of his interim term, Schafer revealed the new logo at a news conference on June 22, 2016, calling the logo's debut a "historic moment".

On March 15, 2016, the selection of Mark Kennedy as the 12th president of the University of North Dakota was announced. Kennedy's term began on July 1 of that same year.

== Electoral history ==
- 1996 Race for Governor
  - Ed Schafer (R) (inc.), 66%
  - Lee Kaldor (D), 34%
- 1992 Race for Governor
  - Ed Schafer (R), 58%
  - Nick Spaeth (D), 41%
- 1990 Race for U.S. House of Representatives – At Large
  - Byron Dorgan (D) (inc.), 65%
  - Ed Schafer (R), 35%

Party political offices
Preceded by Leon Mallberg	Republican nominee for Governor of North Dakota; 1992, 1996	Succeeded by John Hoeven
Preceded by Frank Keating	Chair of the Republican Governors Association; 1999–2000	Succeeded by Jim Gilmore
Political offices
Preceded by George Sinner	Governor of North Dakota; 1992–2000	Succeeded by John Hoeven
Preceded by Mike Johanns	United States Secretary of Agriculture; 2008–2009	Succeeded by Tom Vilsack
Academic offices
Preceded by Robert Kelley	President of the University of North Dakota; Acting; 2016	Succeeded by Mark Kennedy
U.S. order of precedence (ceremonial)
Preceded by James Peake as Former U.S. Cabinet Member	Order of precedence of the United States as Former U.S. Cabinet Member	Succeeded by Steve Preston as Former U.S. Cabinet Member
