= Charles Kupchella =

American academic administrator

10th President of the University of North Dakota
- In office June 30, 1999 – July 1, 2008
- Preceded by: Kendall Baker
- Succeeded by: Robert Kelley

Personal details
- Born: July 7, 1942 (age 83) Nanty Glo, Pennsylvania, U.S.
- Spouse: Adele Kupchella
- Education: Indiana University of Pennsylvania (BSED); St. Bonaventure University (PhD)

Charles E. Kupchella (born July 7, 1942) is an American academic administrator who served as the 10th president of the University of North Dakota (UND) in Grand Forks, North Dakota. He began his presidency in 1999 and retired in 2008. He was succeeded by Robert Kelley effective July 1, 2008.

== Early life and education ==
Kupchella is a native of Nanty Glo, Pennsylvania. In 1964, he graduated from Indiana University of Pennsylvania with a B.S.Ed. and a Pennsylvania biology teaching certification. He then studied at St. Bonaventure University, where, in 1968, he was awarded a Ph.D. in physiology.

== Career ==
He was a consultant for the North Central Association of Colleges and Schools prior to its dissolution, and has served as a reviewer for a number of other organizations, such as the American Cancer Society, the National Institutes of Health, and the National Science Foundation. He is currently professor emeritus at the University of North Dakota.

During Kupchella's tenure, he managed the allocation of a $100 million gift to UND by benefactor Ralph Engelstad and the subsequent construction of the Ralph Engelstad Arena. He also contended with the North Dakota Fighting Sioux controversy and a burgeoning student body that increased by several thousand during his presidency.

== Personal life ==
He lives in Pennsylvania with his wife Adele, a cancer survivor. They have three children.
