= Andrew Armacost =

U.S. Brigadier General and university administrator

Andy Armacost
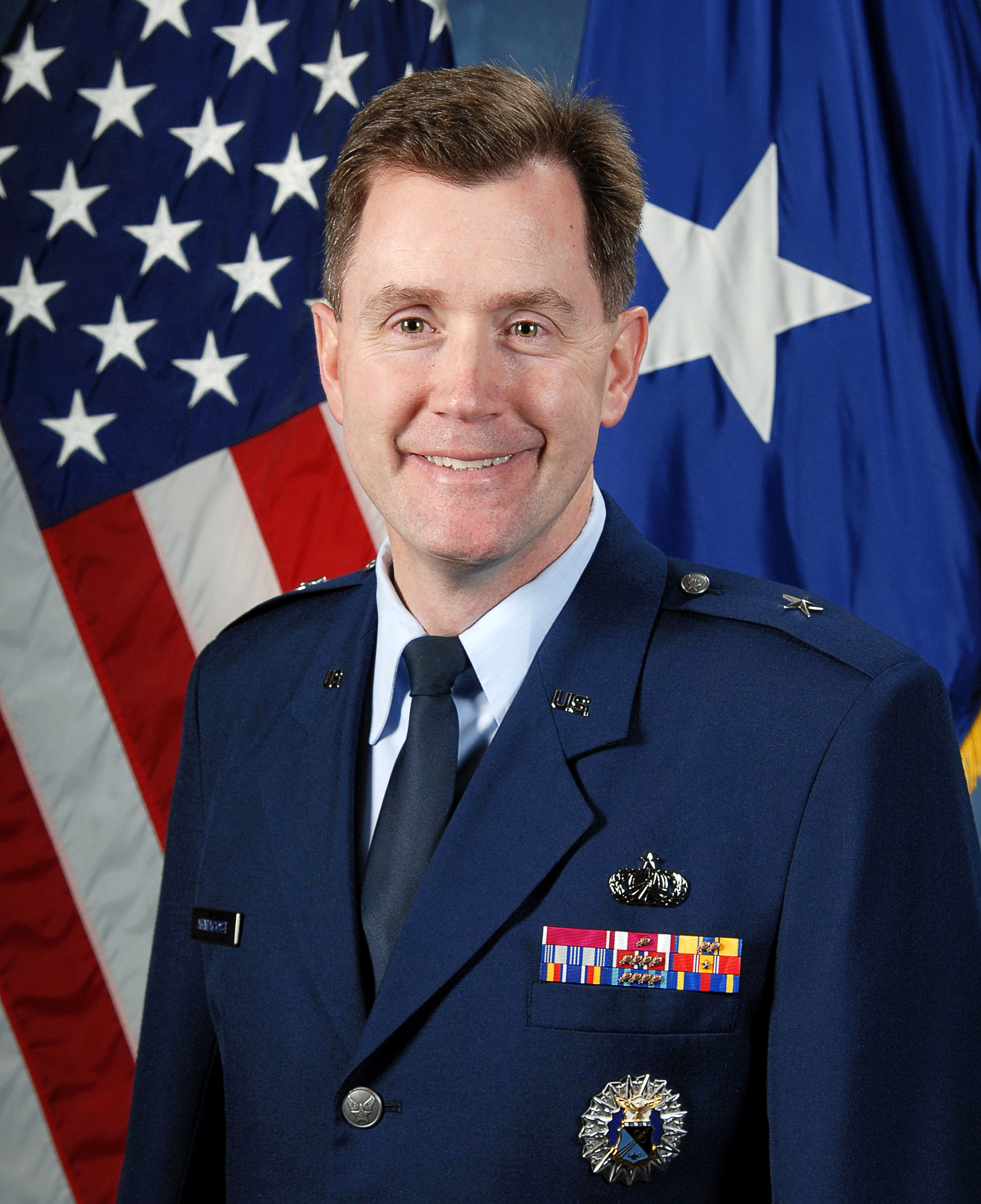
- Armacost in 2013

13th President of the University of North Dakota
- Incumbent
- Assumed office June 1, 2020
- Preceded by: Mark Kennedy

Personal details
- Born: Glendale, Wisconsin, U.S.
- Spouse: Kathy Armacost
- Education: Northwestern University (BS); Massachusetts Institute of Technology (MS, PhD)

Military service
- Allegiance: United States
- Branch/service: United States Air Force
- Years of service: 1989–2019
- Rank: Brigadier General
- Awards: Legion of Merit; Meritorious Service Medal with 1 oak leaf cluster Air Force Commendation Medal with 2 oak leaf clusters Air Force Achievement Medal

Academic background
- Thesis: Composite variable formulations for express shipment service network design (2000)
- Doctoral advisor: Cynthia Barnhart

Academic work
- Discipline: Logistics
- Institutions: United States Air Force Academy; University of North Dakota

Andrew Armacost is the 13th and current president of the University of North Dakota, and a retired brigadier general in the United States Air Force. He previously served as the dean of the faculty of the United States Air Force Academy.

== Early life and education ==
Armacost is a native of Glendale, Wisconsin, where he graduated from Nicolet High School in 1985. He later graduated from Northwestern University and the Massachusetts Institute of Technology. His father served the United States Coast Guard and earned a PhD in operations research.

Armacost attended Northwestern University, where he graduated in 1989 with honors as a ROTC Distinguished Graduate with a Bachelor of Science in industrial engineering. In 1995, he received a Master of Science in operations research from the Massachusetts Institute of Technology, where he was a Draper Fellow. His master's thesis focused on optimizing the scheduling and sequencing of railroad yards and transportation networks, and was advised by Professor (and later Chancellor) Cynthia Barnhart. He later returned to MIT and was awarded a PhD in operations research in 2000, where his research on algorithmic approaches for aircraft and fleet routing was sponsored by UPS.

He received his military education from the Squadron Officer School, the Air Command and Staff College and the Air War College.

== Air Force career ==
Armacost commissioned as an Air Force officer in 1989, and was assigned to the Electronic Systems Center at Hanscom Air Force Base, Massachusetts. After completing his master's degree, he served as an instructor in the Department of Management at the U.S. Air Force Academy in Colorado Springs from July 1995 to August 1997. After a three-year break to earn his PhD, he returned as a professor in the Department of Management from July 2000 to July 2007. Armacost briefly served as the chief analyst of Air Force Space Command at Peterson Air Force Base before being appointed permanent professor and department head of the Department of Management. in June 2008. In June 2013, Armacost was appointed dean of the faculty at the academy.

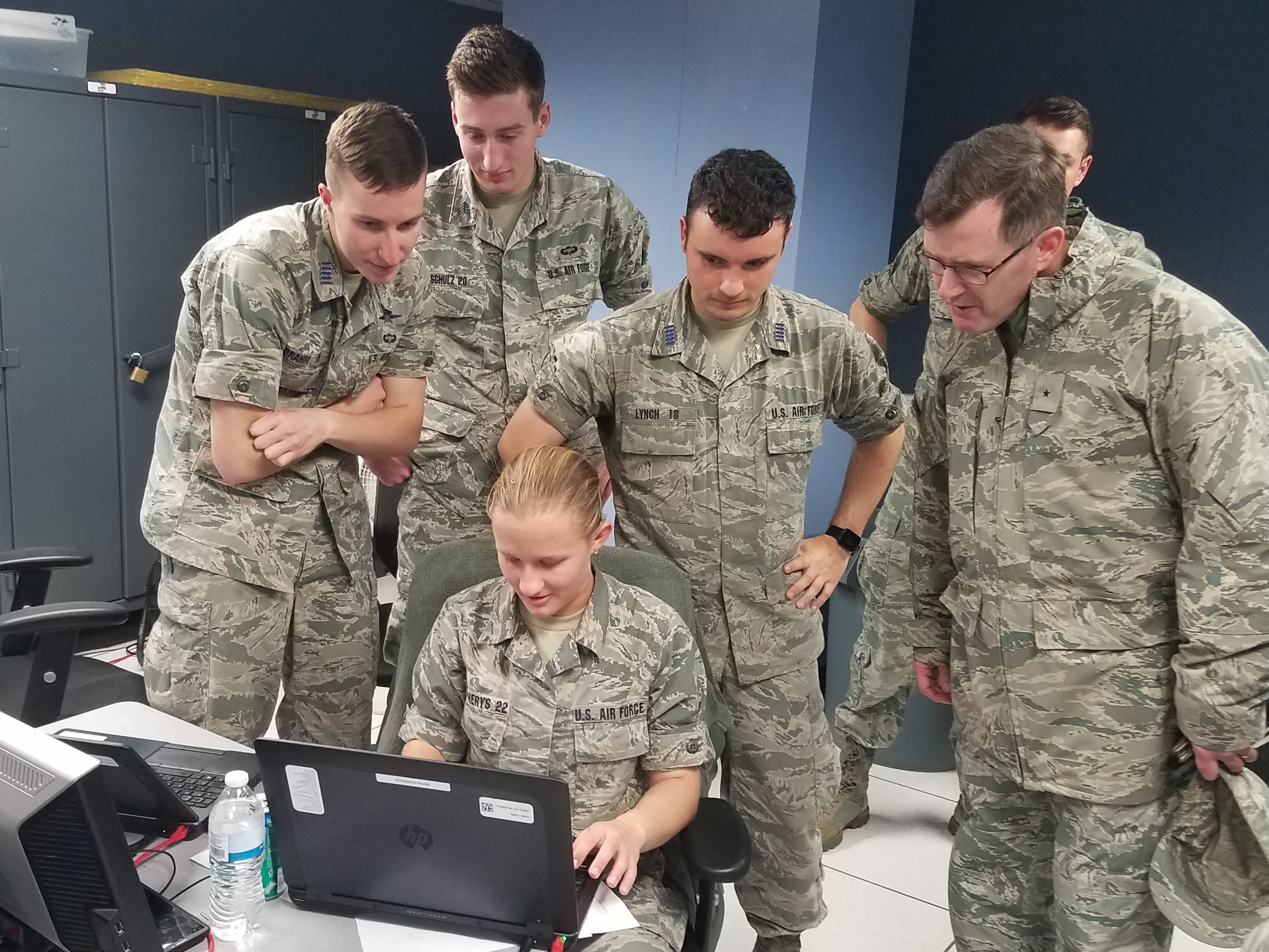
Brigadier General Armacost with members of the Air Force Academy Cyber Competition Team

As dean of the faculty, Brigadier General Armacost led approximately 700 faculty in the design and construction of more than 500 undergraduate courses for 4,000 cadets across 32 academic disciplines.

In 2018, Brigadier General Armacost announced that he would retire effective August 1, 2019, having served a total of 19 years of his 30-year USAF career at the Air Force Academy.

== University of North Dakota ==
On December 3, 2019, Armacost was named president of the University of North Dakota. He assumed the position on June 1, 2020, succeeding Mark Kennedy and interim president Joshua Wynne. Due to his assumption of the office during the COVID-19 pandemic, Armacost began his presidency remotely from his home in Colorado.

In August 2021, UND became the first participant in the United States Space Force's University Partnership program under Andrew Armacost.

In September 2021, Former UND Police Chief Eric Plummer said that Armacost fired one of the two administrators that he believed discriminated against him because of his political convictions.

== Awards and honors ==
- Legion of Merit
- Meritorious Service Medal with one oak leaf cluster
- Air Force Commendation Medal with two oak leaf clusters
- Air Force Achievement Medal
- 2001 George B. Dantzig Dissertation Award, Institute for Operations Research and the Management Sciences (INFORMS)
- 2012 Franz Edelman Laureate (INFORMS)
- 2018 class of Fellows of the Institute for Operations Research and the Management Sciences.
