= Fighting Over Sioux =

2020 documentary by Matt Fern

- Directed by: Matt Fern
- Written by: Matt Fern
- Produced by: Matt Fern
- Release date: November 25, 2020
- Running time: 84 minutes
- Country: United States
- Language: English

Fighting Over Sioux is an American documentary film directed by Matt Fern about the controversy surrounding the University of North Dakota’s (UND) Fighting Sioux nickname and logo.

== Background ==
The film centers on the long-running North Dakota Fighting Sioux controversy, a dispute over the use of the Fighting Sioux nickname and logo by the University of North Dakota (UND) athletic teams. The nickname and logo were placed on the National Collegiate Athletic Association’s list of "hostile and abusive" Native American imagery in 2005, prompting sanctions that prohibited UND from hosting or wearing the imagery during post-season play unless it received approval from both the Standing Rock and Spirit Lake Sioux tribes, a condition that was not met by the deadline. UND ultimately retired the Fighting Sioux name and logo and adopted the nickname North Dakota Fighting Hawks in 2015 following statewide debate, legal challenges, legislative action, and a public vote on the issue.

== Production and release ==
Fighting Over Sioux was filmed over a seven-year period. Production included interviews conducted across North Dakota, including Grand Forks, Fargo, and Bismarck, as well as on the Standing Rock, Spirit Lake, and Turtle Mountain Indian reservations.

In 2015, Fern launched a Kickstarter campaign to raise funds for post-production of the film. The campaign exceeded its $50,000 goal, raising $51,816.

The film premiered at the Portland Film Festival and later won Best Documentary at the South Dakota Film Festival. Following its festival run, Fighting Over Sioux received a limited theatrical release in the region. The film made its television broadcast debut on WDAY in 2021.
