= Hallmark/Westland Meat Packing Company =

American meat packaging company

Hallmark/Westland Meat Packing Company was a California-based meat packaging company. It was forced into bankruptcy due to costs from a meat recall and ensuing litigation.

== 2008 recall ==
On February 17, 2008, Hallmark/Westland Meat Packing Company voluntarily recalled just over 143 million pounds (65 million kilograms) of raw and frozen beef products, considered the largest meat recall in the United States, following an investigation into animal cruelty.

The recall came in the wake of animal cruelty and violations of the law at a slaughtering plant, by an investigation conducted by The Humane Society of the United States. An investigator for the HSUS videotaped workers abusing downed animals unable to walk into the kill pens on their own.

The USDA's Food Safety and Inspection Service had determined that beef products produced by the Chino, California, company were unfit for human consumption as the cattle had not received "complete and proper inspection."

The recall was designated as Class II, which the USDA describes as "a health hazard situation where there is a remote probability of adverse health consequences from the use of the product."

On Friday, Secretary of Agriculture Ed Schafer indicated that charges had been laid against employees of the plant alleged to have taken part in the mistreatment of cattle. "Today [Friday], the San Bernardino District Attorney filed felony animal cruelty charges against two employees who were terminated by Hallmark/Westland Meat Packing Company," said Schafer. "It is regrettable that these animals were mistreated and I am encouraged and supportive of these actions by the San Bernardino District Attorney in response to this mistreatment."

The USDA learned of the possible inhumane handling of non-ambulatory (disabled) cattle at the packing plant on January 30 and has since suspended activities at the plant. "We continue to conduct a thorough investigation into whether any violations of food safety or additional humane handling regulations have occurred," said Secretary Schafer in a press release. "On February 8, our Office of the Inspector General took the lead on the investigation. At that time, USDA extended the administrative hold on Hallmark/Westland Meat Packing Company products for the National School Lunch Program, the Emergency Food Assistance Program and the Food Distribution Program on Indian Reservations while the investigation continues," said Schafer.

The Food Safety and Inspection Service reported that Hallmark/Westland had not contacted their public health veterinarian, as required, when cattle became ill or disabled after undergoing ante-mortem (slaughter) inspection, putting the company out of compliance with regulations. "Because the cattle did not receive complete and proper inspection FSIS has determined them to be unfit for human food and the company is conducting a recall," explained Secretary Schafer.

The cruelty charges stem from an undercover video that reportedly showed sick cattle being moved by crews using forklifts.

"Words cannot accurately express how shocked and horrified I was at the depictions contained on the video that was taken by an individual who worked at our facility from October 3 thru November 14, 2007," said Steve Mendell, President, Westland Meat Co. and Hallmark Meat Packing. "We have taken swift action regarding the two employees identified on the video and have already implemented aggressive measures to ensure all employees follow our humane handling policies and procedures. We are also cooperating with the USDA investigators on the allegations of inhumane handling treatment which is a serious breach of our company’s policies and training."

The USDA stressed that it is "extremely unlikely" that the cattle involved were at risk for Bovine spongiform encephalopathy (BSE) or mad-cow disease due to the employment of multiple safeguards. The USDA felt the recall was required, however, as the plant had allegedly violated USDA regulations.

In late February testimony before a subcommittee of the Senate Agriculture Committee, USDA Secretary Ed Schafer said that the agency would not favor a full ban on downers in the food supply.

At about the same time, the HSUS sued in federal court to close the loophole by which downers continue to be accepted into the food supply.
