= List of presidents of the University of North Dakota =

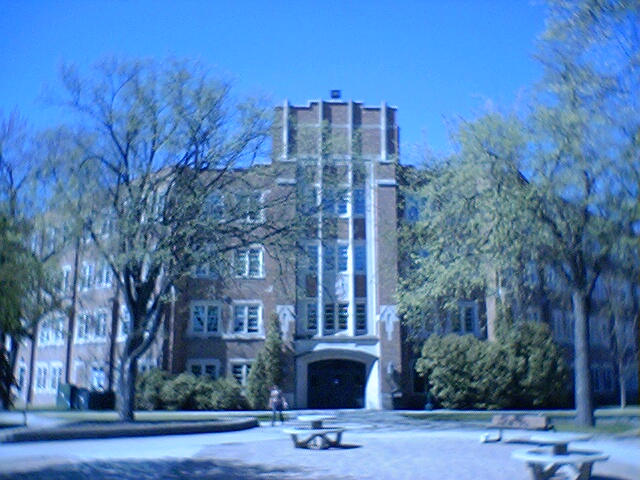
Twamley Hall at UND which houses the office of the University President

The following is a complete list of the presidents of the University of North Dakota, located in Grand Forks, North Dakota. Dr. Andrew Armacost was selected as the 13th president on December 3, 2019.

#	Image	President	Term
1		William M. Blackburn	1884–1885
–		Henery Montgomery (acting)	1885–1887
2		Homer Sprague	1887–1891
3		Webster Merrifield	1891–1909
4		Frank L. McVey	1909–1917
–		Earl Babcock (acting)	1917–1918
5		Thomas F. Kane	1918–1933
6		John C. West	1933–1954
7		George Starcher	1954–1971
8		Thomas J. Clifford	1971–1992
9		Kendall Baker	1992–1999
10		Charles E. Kupchella	1999–2008
11		Robert Kelley	2008–2016
–		Ed Schafer (acting)	2016
12		Mark Kennedy	2016–2019
–		Joshua Wynne (acting)	2019
13		Andrew Armacost	2019–present
