= Shapeholder =

Corporate actors who maintain firm activities

Shapeholders are the political, regulatory, media, and activist actors in the firm's operating environment that shape, constrain, or expand a firm's opportunities and risks. They are distinguished from stakeholders in that they may have no stake in an organization's success, yet they still have the ability to shape its operating environment. The only stake an environmental activist may want in a coal company is a stake through its corporate heart, yet it can still shape the opportunities and risks of a coal company.

Mark Kennedy first introduced the concept of shapeholders to business strategy in courses taught at Johns Hopkins University's Carey Business School in 2012 and while at George Washington University's Graduate School of Political Management through an article in Emerald Group Publishing's Strategy & Leadership journal in 2013 and through a Massive Open Online Course (MOOC) in 2015.

Shapeholders are important in business practice and in theorizing relating to strategic management, corporate governance, business purpose, corporate social responsibility (CSR), and creating shared value (CSV).

== Shapeholder Engagement Theory ==
According to Shapeholder Engagement Theory treating shapeholders as stakeholders when they have little or no stake in an organization's success, leads to sub-optimal results. Therefore, unique engagement strategies are required.

Seven Steps for Shapeholder Success

One approach to effective shapeholder engagement is the “Seven Steps for Shapeholder Success” advanced by Mark Kennedy that takes a long-term view of the most beneficial path for organizations to engage with elements of society lacking a significant natural stake in their success.

Each step begins with the letter "A". The first set of “A’s” – Align, Anticipate, and Assess – define how to be well positioned with respect to shapeholder actions. The second set of “A’s” – Advance, Avert, Acquiesce and Assemble – explain how to act in response to an attack or opportunity posed by shapeholders as illustrated by the Shapeholder Decision Matrix.

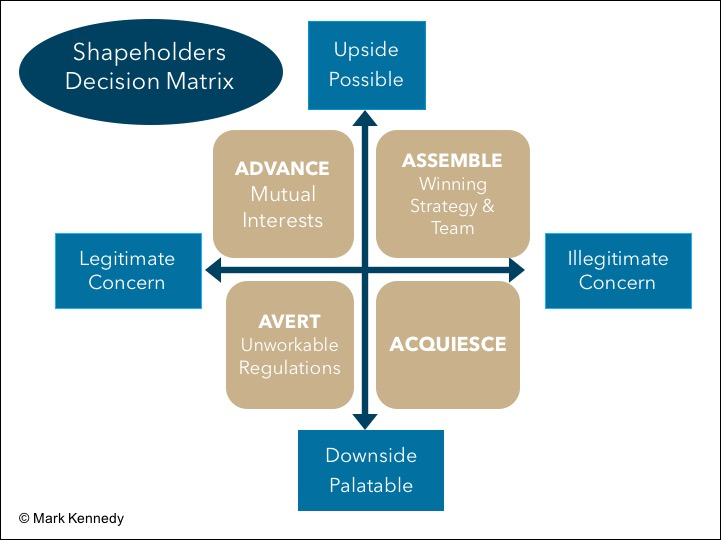
Shapeholder Decision Matrix

If organizations either must or believe they can prevail through the "Assemble" option in the Shapeholder Decision Matrix, it is essential to optimize the right mix of Why, What (Message), Where (Arena), Who (Coalition), How (Channel), and When in order to succeed.

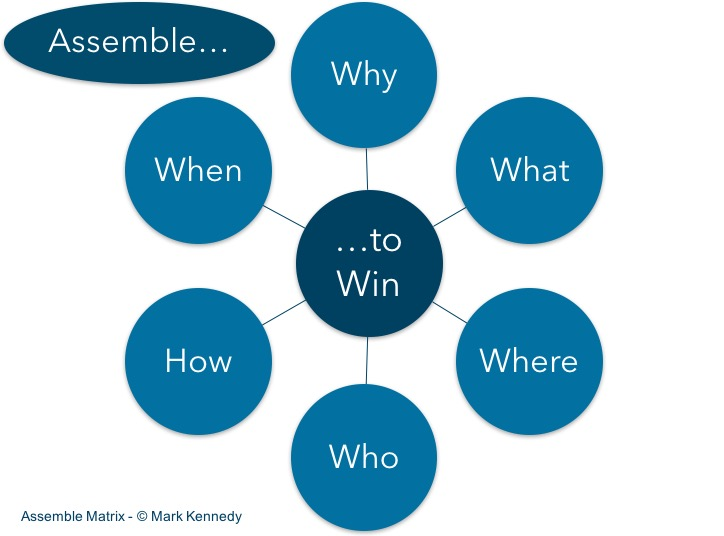
Assemble Matrix of Shapeholders
