= Homer Sprague =

American university president (1829–1918)

Personal details
- Born: Homer Baxter Sprague; October 19, 1829 Sutton, Massachusetts, United States
- Died: March 23, 1918 (aged 88)
- Education: Yale University; New York University
- Profession: Educator, lawyer, University president

Military service
- Allegiance: United States of America
- Branch/service: Union Army
- Years of service: 1861–1866
- Rank: Colonel Lieutenant colonel Captain
- Commands: 13th Connecticut Infantry Regiment
- Battles/wars: American Civil War

Homer Baxter Sprague (October 19, 1829 – March 23, 1918) was an American author, educator, abolitionist, and Lieutenant Colonel of the Union Army. A native of Sutton, Massachusetts, Sprague was a Captain of the 13th Connecticut Infantry Regiment in 1861 when the American Civil War began, and quickly rose to the rank of Colonel before being captured as a prisoner of war by the Confederate Army in 1864. In 1865 he was released in a prisoner exchange, and remained active within the military until the end of the war.

He served as President of Mills College in California from 1885 to 1887, and was appointed President of the University of North Dakota in 1887. An early progressive voice in education, he served as president of Adelphi Academy in New York as it first opened its doors to female students. While there, he institutionalized the first fire drills in the United States school system.

== Education ==
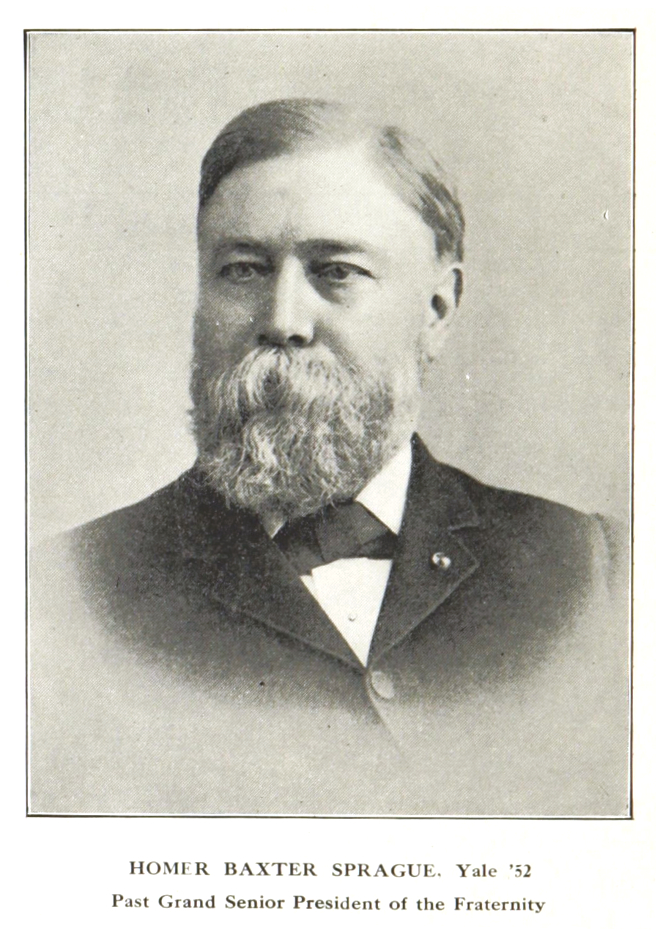
Sprague c. 1916

Sprague attended Leicaster Academy beginning in 1847. He was valedictorian of his class, and in 1848 he entered Yale University to study law and literature. He was president of Yale's Linonian Society, editor of the Yale Literary Magazine, and one of the original members of the Scroll and Key Society, a splinter of the infamous Skull and Bones Society that separated in 1842 after a dispute within the organization regarding electoral practices. He was again the class valedictorian, graduating with a B.A. in 1852, and being admitted to the bar in 1854.

== Early career ==
After leaving university, Sprague spent his time as a lecturer and tutor, while continuing his studies to earn his M.A.. He wrote prolifically, often published in newspapers, and published numerous articles and pamphlets displaying his fervent anti-slavery sentiments. His first position of significance was as principal of the Worcester Classical and English High School in Worcester, Massachusetts in July 1856. He was the originator of the enterprise which, in 1878, became Martha's Vineyard Summer Institute, the first summer school for teachers in the U.S.

Sprague practiced law in Worcester County and New Haven for a few years, though he often remarked, "not long enough to do much harm!".

== Family ==
Sprague is a direct descendant of William Sprague, one of the three Sprague brothers who chartered and founded Charlestown, Massachusetts in 1628 (annexed into Boston proper in 1874).

Sprague was married to Nettie Pardee, sister of Sarah Winchester, heiress to the Winchester rifle fortune.

== Bibliography ==
- Sprague, Homer B. (1867). History of the 13th Infantry Regiment of Connecticut Volunteers During the Great Rebellion. Hartford, Connecticut: Case, Lockwood and Co.
- Sprague, Homer B. (1903). The Right and Wrong in our War between the States (September ed.).
- Sprague, Homer B. (1915). Lights and Shadows in Confederate Prisons: A Personal Experience, 1864-5. G. P. Putnam's Sons.

Academic offices
Preceded by Cyrus Taggart Mills	President of Mills College; 1885–1887	Succeeded by Charles Carroll Stratton
Preceded by Henery Montgomery Acting	President of the University of North Dakota; 1887–1891	Succeeded by Webster Merrifield
