= Swoop (University of Utah) =

Mascot for the University of Utah

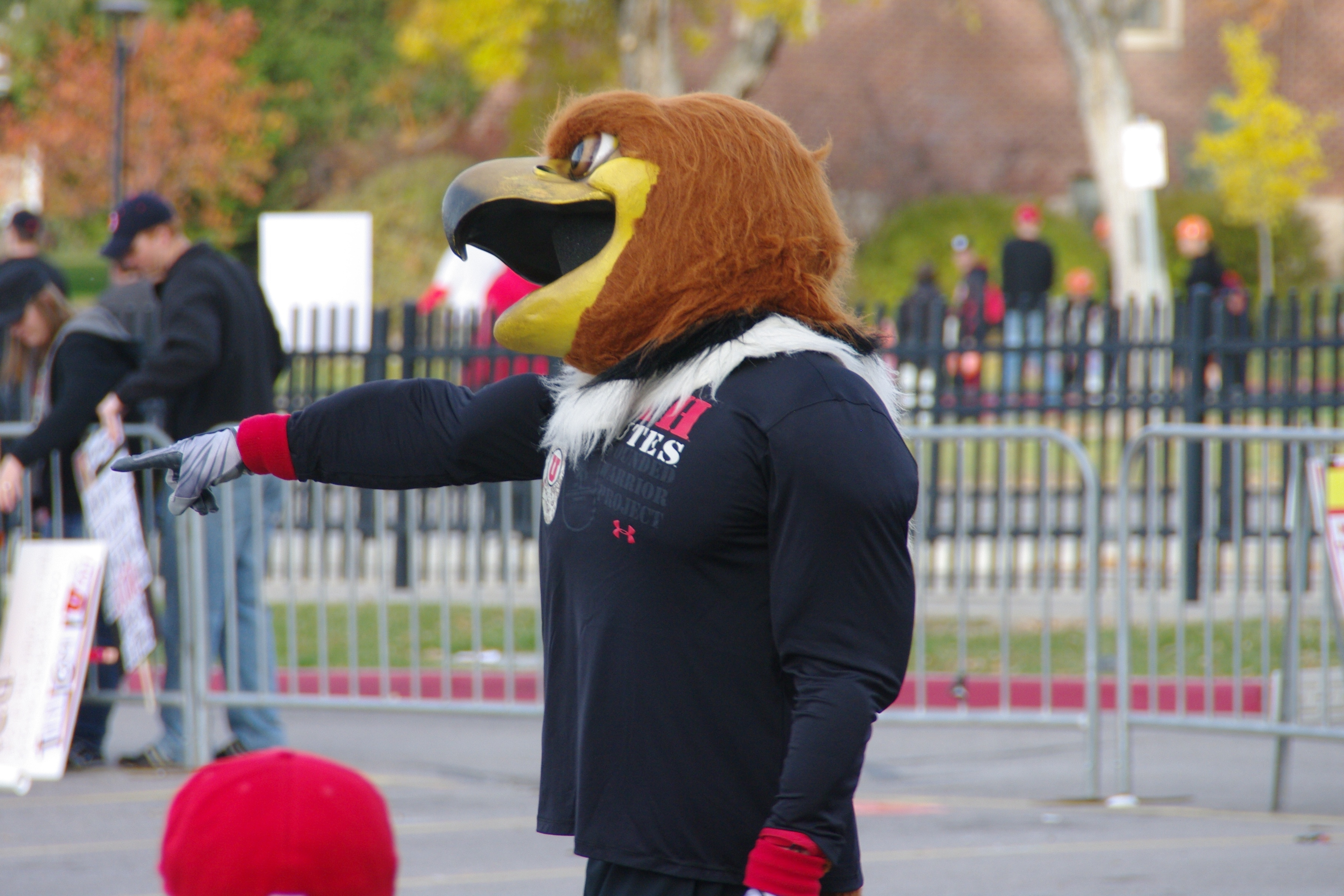
- University: University of Utah
- Conference: Big 12
- First seen: 1996
- Website: UtahUtes.com

Swoop is a body-suit mascot for the University of Utah.

== History ==
Swoop, a red-tailed hawk, is the mascot of the Utah Utes sports teams. The university introduced Swoop with the consent of the tribal council of the Ute tribe in 1996. Originally the school's mascot was an American Indian, but was dropped. Later Hoyo, a cartoon Indian Boy, became an unofficial mascot, but was also dropped. During the 1980s the Crimson Warrior, a Caucasian horseman dressed in Indian costume, would ride onto the field before home football games and plant a lance into a bale of hay. The warrior was considered more a symbol of the school than a mascot.

== See also ==
- NCAA Native American mascot decision
