= William M. Blackburn =

American minister, church historian and educator

William Maxwell Blackburn (December 30, 1828 – December 29, 1898) was an American Presbyterian minister, church historian, and educator.

Blackburn studied at Hanover College and Princeton Theological Seminary and served as a pastor before becoming Professor of Biblical and Ecclesiastical History at the Theological Seminary of the Northwest in Chicago. In 1884 he was appointed the first president of the University of North Dakota, but was dismissed after only a year due to disagreements in establishing the academic curriculum. He subsequently served at president of Pierre College in South Dakota.

While in Pierre, he and his wife lived in a house which has become known as the Dr. William and Elizabeth Blackburn House.

Preceded by Position established	President of the University of North Dakota; 1884 - 1885	Succeeded by Henery Montgomery
