= Webster Merrifield =

American educator, former University of North Dakota president

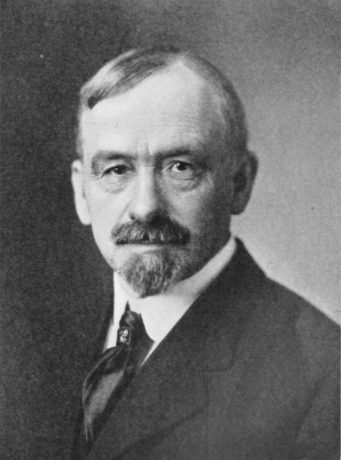

3rd President of the University of North Dakota
- Preceded by: Homer Sprague
- Succeeded by: Frank L. McVey

Personal details
- Born: July 27, 1852
- Died: January 22, 1916 (aged 63)
- Education: Yale University

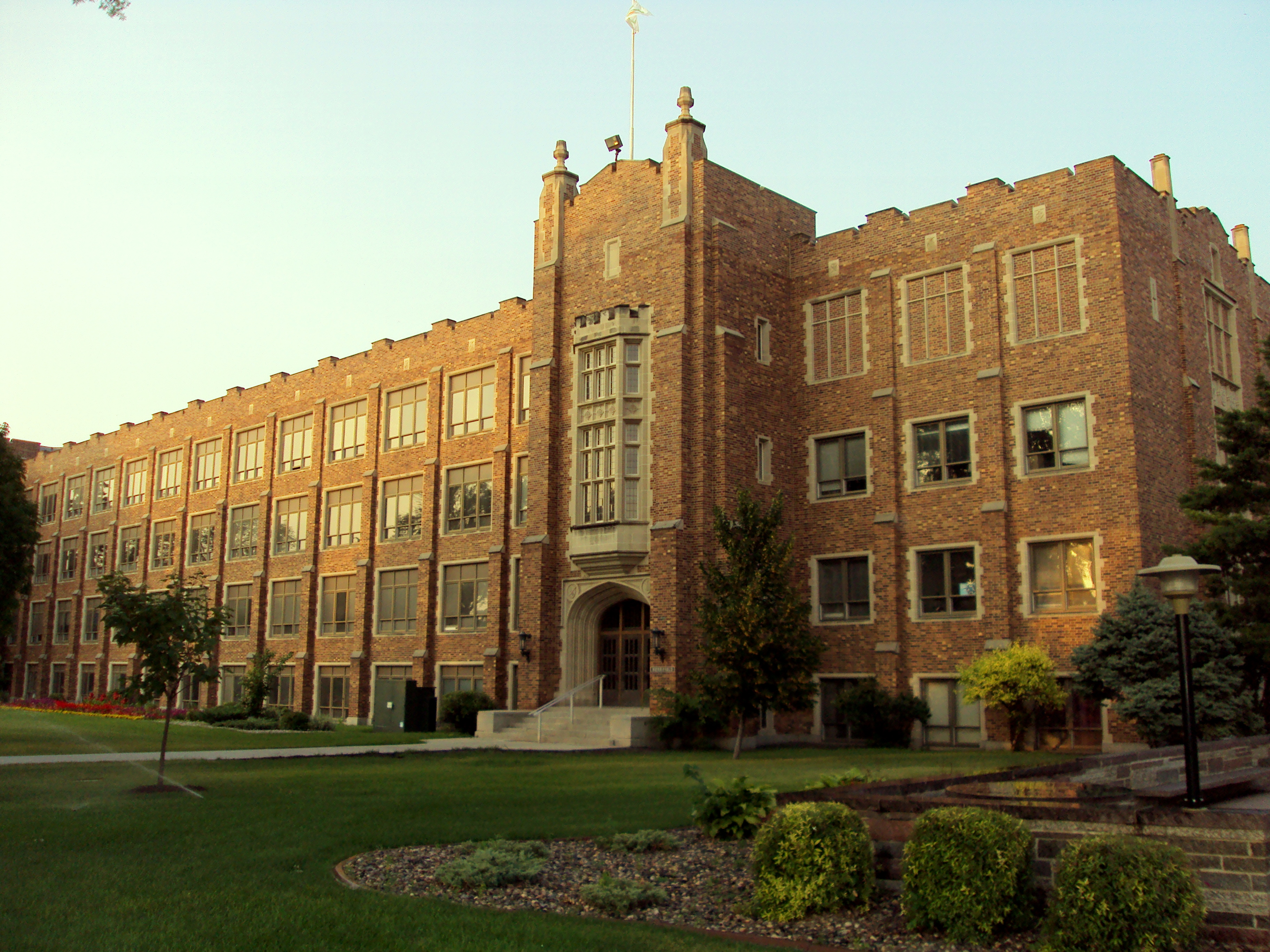
Merrifield Hall at the University of North Dakota, built in 1929

Webster Merrifield (July 27, 1852 in Newfane, Vermont – January 22, 1916) was an American educator and academic who served as the third President of the University of North Dakota from 1891 to 1909.

Called the Father of Secondary Education in North Dakota, he was responsible for widespread standard reform among the states high schools and secondary schools. During his tenure as UND President he oversaw the creation of both its Law School and Medical School, and is credited with developing the University into a nationally recognized institution. Merrifield Hall, the University's Liberal Arts building, is named in his honor.

Merrifield had graduated from Yale University in 1877, and taught Greek and Latin at the Yale until moving to the Dakota Territory in 1883 to teach the languages at the University Of North Dakota, where he also taught Literature and Political Science.

Preceded by Homer Sprague	President of the University of North Dakota; 1891 - 1909	Succeeded by Frank L. McVey
