= Dr. William and Elizabeth Blackburn House =

Historic house in South Dakota, United States

- U.S. National Register of Historic Places
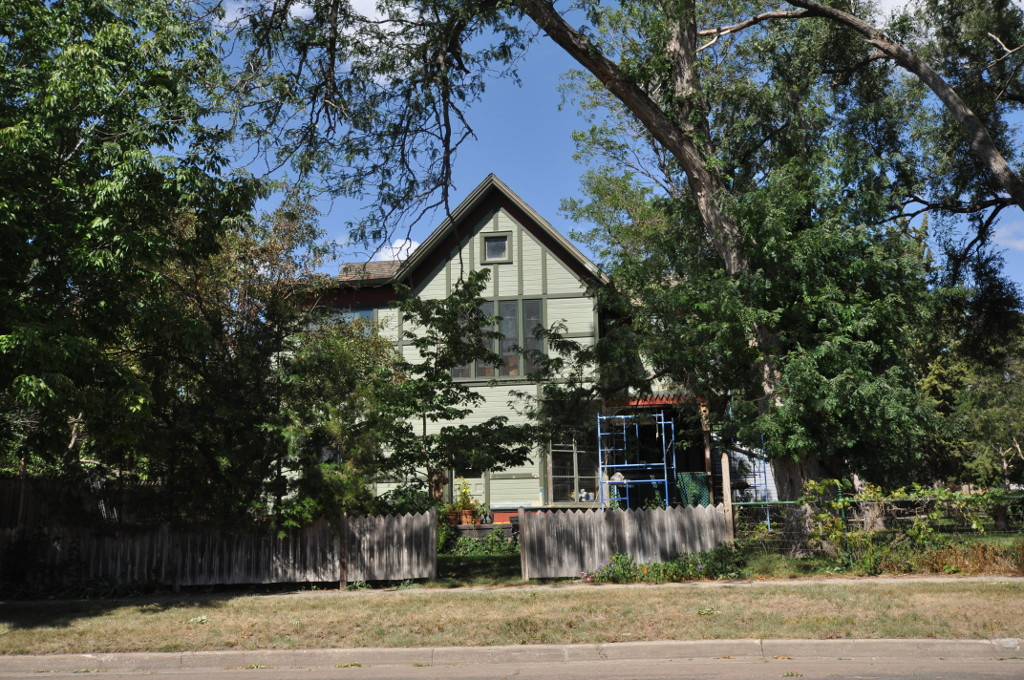

- Location within South Dakota Location within the United States
- Location: 219 S. Tyler Ave., Pierre, South Dakota, US
- Coordinates: 44°21′44″N 100°19′37″W
- Area: less than one acre
- Built: 1883
- Built by: H. O. Fishback
- Architectural style: StickEastlake
- NRHP reference No.: 97000426
- Added to NRHP: May 9, 1997

The Dr. William and Elizabeth Blackburn House is a historic two-story wooden house located in Pierre, South Dakota. Designed in the Stick or Eastlake style of Queen Anne style architecture, it was built in 1883 by local banker and real estate speculator, H. O. Fishback. In 1887, it was bought by the Rev. Dr. William Maxwell Blackburn and his wife, Elizabeth Powell Blackburn, who had come to Pierre from Grand Forks, North Dakota, where he had been president of the University of North Dakota. Dr. Blackburn, a Presbyterian minister, scholar and author became the founding president of the Presbyterian University of Southern Dakota, which later became Pierre University and served as such until his death in 1898. Following his death, Pierre University was relocated to Huron, where it became Huron University. Later owners include C. B. Billinghurst, local newspaper publisher, and Harold King and his wife Irma E. King. The Kings ran a grocery store and he was a local politician while she was a poet.

On May 9, 1997, the house was added to the National Register of Historic Places'
