= Sammy Seminole =

First mascot of the Florida State Seminoles

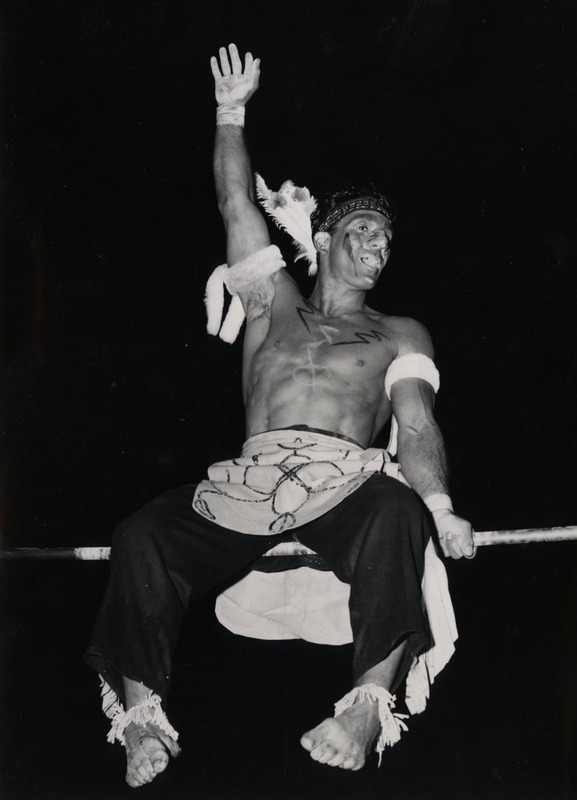
Chick Cicio as Sammy Seminole at Homecoming 1958

Sammy Seminole was the first mascot of the Florida State University Seminoles. He was introduced in 1958 and was retired in 1972 in an effort to find a less insensitive mascot.

== History ==
Sammy Seminole debuted at the 1958 FSU Pow Wow homecoming event. For the first several years he was portrayed by white students from FSU's gymnastics program wearing faux-Native American garb. The character led the Seminoles football team onto the field at the start of the game, and then led the crowd by performing cheers and acrobatic stunts. The gymnastics program ceased sponsoring Sammy Seminole in 1968, though the character was soon re-introduced. In the late 1960s Sammy Seminole was joined by the even more stereotyped "Chief Fullabull", who served as the mascot for the basketball team.

Both Sammy Seminole and the basketball mascot were eventually retired by the school in order to find a more respectful school mascot. In 1977 they were replaced by Chief Osceola and Renegade. Chief Osceola has been officially supported by the Seminole Tribe of Florida.
