= Colonel Ebirt =

Unofficial school mascot for the College of William & Mary

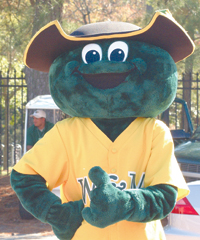
- Colonel Ebirt giving a 'thumbs up' prior to a Tribe football game.
- University: College of William & Mary
- Conference: CAA
- Description: Green and Gold Frog
- Origin of name: "Tribe" spelled backwards
- First seen: 2001-2005

Colonel Ebirt was the unofficial school mascot for the College of William & Mary from 2001 to 2005. A green and gold frog that donned a tri-corner hat, Colonel Ebirt was originally used as a promotional tool for Colonial Williamsburg. It became involved with the College athletics program when someone from the William & Mary gymnastics program volunteered to wear the costume. "Ebirt" is an anadrome of Tribe, and "Colonel" comes from the school's historical and geographical ties to Williamsburg, Virginia, specifically that of Colonial Williamsburg.

The athletic department decided to "retire" Ebirt upon the conclusion of the 2005–06 school year. On April 6, 2010, William & Mary announced that a griffin was to become their official mascot, replacing Ebirt.

== See also ==
- Griffin – William & Mary's mascot successor to Colonel Ebirt
- List of U.S. college mascots
