= Chief Moccanooga =

Former athletic mascot of the University of Tennessee at Chattanooga

Chief Moccanooga was the former athletic mascot for the University of Tennessee at Chattanooga, until 1996, when the university abandoned the mascot as potentially offensive at the request of the Chattanooga InterTribal Association. Chief Moccanooga was replaced with a mockingbird, the state bird of Tennessee, and the nickname for Chattanooga athletics was changed from 'Moccasins' to simply 'Mocs'.

Chattanooga's decision to remove Chief Moccanooga as mascot was similar to the actions of several other athletic franchises. In 1986, Chief Noc-A-Homa, the former drum-thumping mascot of Major League Baseball's the Atlanta Braves, was removed. The Cleveland Indians continued to employ a potentially offensive Native American mascot, Chief Wahoo until 2018.
