= Mark Kennedy (politician) =

American businessman, politician, and academic administrator (born 1957)

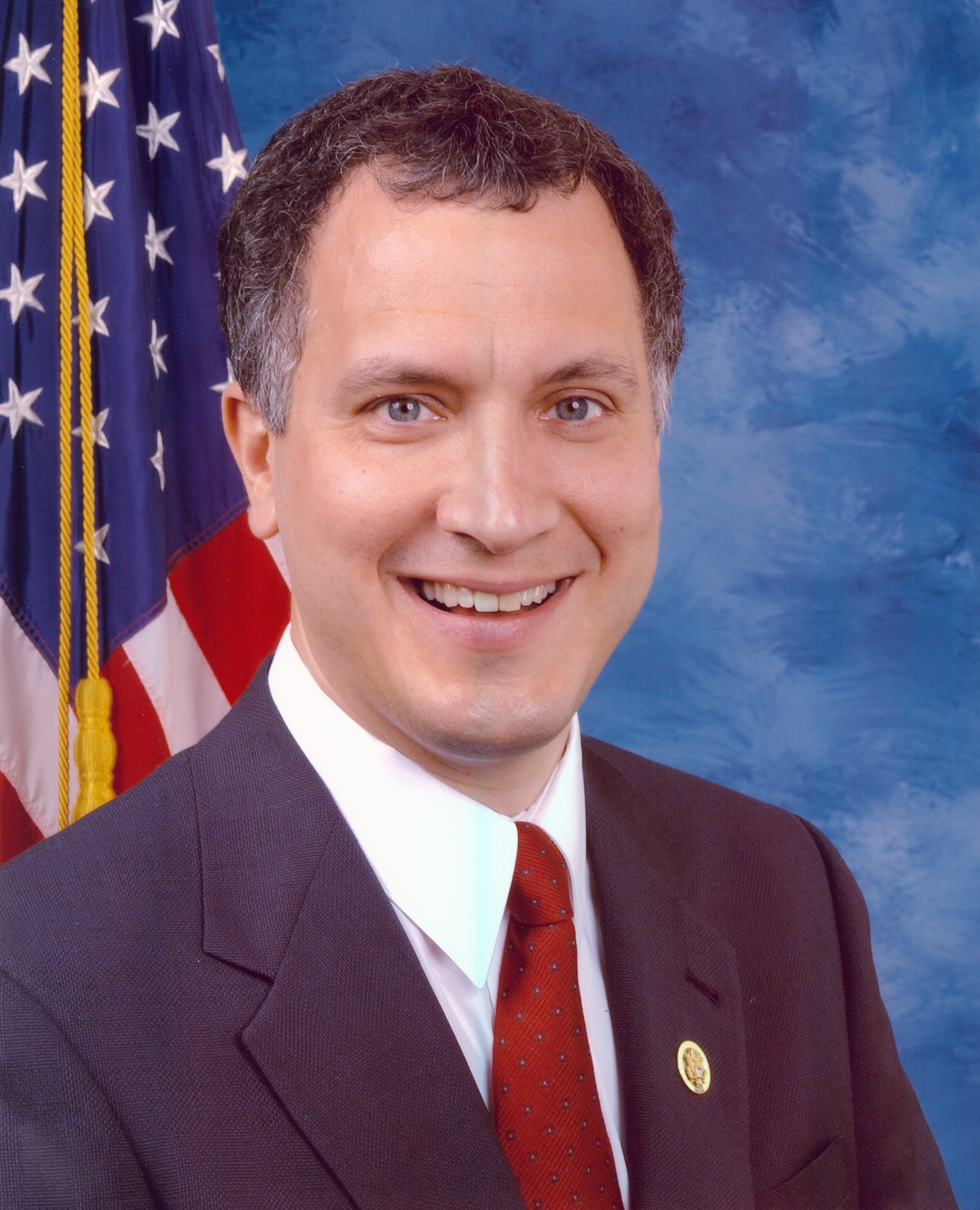
- Congressional portrait, 2001

23rd President of the University of Colorado System
- In office July 1, 2019 – July 1, 2021
- Preceded by: Bruce D. Benson
- Succeeded by: Todd Saliman

12th President of the University of North Dakota
- In office July 1, 2016 – June 15, 2019
- Preceded by: Ed Schafer (acting)
- Succeeded by: Joshua Wynne (acting)

Member of the U.S. House of Representatives from Minnesota
- In office January 3, 2001 – January 3, 2007
- Preceded by: David Minge
- Succeeded by: Michele Bachmann
- Constituency: 2nd district (2001–2003); 6th district (2003–2007)

Personal details
- Born: Mark Raymond Kennedy; April 11, 1957 (age 69) Benson, Minnesota, U.S.
- Party: Republican
- Spouse: Debbie Kennedy
- Education: St. John's University (BS); University of Michigan (MBA)

Mark Raymond Kennedy (born April 11, 1957) is an American businessman, politician, and university administrator. Following a career as a business executive, he served as a Republican member of the United States House of Representatives from Minnesota from 2001 to 2007. Kennedy did not seek reelection in 2006, instead running in the 2006 election for U.S. Senate, which he lost to Democratic–Farmer–Labor nominee Amy Klobuchar.

Afterward, he joined George Washington University and became director of The Graduate School of Political Management in 2012. He later became 12th president of the University of North Dakota, serving from 2016 to 2019 before becoming the 23rd president of the University of Colorado (CU) system, in office from 2019 to 2021.

In 2023, Kennedy began serving as Director of the Wilson Center's Wahba Institute for Strategic Competition, but has since left that position.

== Early life and business career ==
Kennedy graduated from Pequot Lakes High School in 1975 and St. John's University in 1979. He began his career as a certified public accountant and went on to receive his M.B.A. with distinction from the University of Michigan's Ross School of Business in 1983.

Kennedy's business career included working for the Pillsbury Company, assisting with its acquisition of Häagen-Dazs and arranging for financing to support its international expansion. As a senior executive at Federated Department Stores, he helped the company position itself for growth to become, as Macy's, the world's leading department store. He was profiled in May 1992's Institutional Investor Magazine, which featured him as one of "America's top CFOs". At ShopKo Stores, he was responsible for merchandising, marketing and store management.

== Political career (2001–2007) ==
=== U.S. House of Representatives ===
In 2000 Kennedy won the Republican nomination for the 2nd district and faced four-term Democratic incumbent David Minge. He had never run for political office before. In the second closest congressional race of that cycle, Kennedy defeated Minge by 155 votes.

Leading up to the 2002 elections, although Minnesota did not gain or lose any districts, Kennedy's 2nd district—an enormous 28-county district stretching from the southwestern corner of the state to the fringes of the Twin Cities—was dismantled. Its territory was split up among four neighboring districts. Kennedy's home outside Watertown was just inside the reconfigured 6th district, in the Twin Cities' northern suburbs.

In 2002 Kennedy initially expected to face the 6th district's three-term Democratic incumbent, Bill Luther. But the new 6th was somewhat more Republican than its predecessor, and Luther opted to move to the reconfigured 2nd district, where he eventually lost to John Kline. Kennedy instead faced Janet Robert, a lawyer and longtime Democratic activist. In one of the most expensive congressional races in Minnesota history, Kennedy was elected with 57% of the vote.

In 2004, Kennedy faced child safety advocate Patty Wetterling. He received 54% percent of the vote to Wetterling's 46%.

=== 2006 U.S. Senate election ===
Kennedy did not seek reelection to the House in 2006. Instead he ran against DFL nominee and Hennepin County Attorney Amy Klobuchar for the U.S. Senate seat being vacated by DFL incumbent Mark Dayton. Also in the race were the Independence Party nominee, Robert Fitzgerald; the Green Party nominee, Michael Cavlan; and the Constitution Party nominee, Ben Powers.

Klobuchar won the election, receiving 58% of the vote to Kennedy's 38%.

=== Political positions ===
Kennedy's support of the proposed surge in the Iraq War during the 2006 Senate election was described as "bold and smart" on the Brit Hume show on Fox News (Fox News, Brit Hume Show, 12-27-06). Anderson Cooper, an anchor on CNN, said that "Kennedy doesn't ignore the elephant in the room. To the contrary, he looks it straight in the eye" (CNN, Anderson Cooper 360°, 10-25-06).

A proponent of free trade, Kennedy voted for giving the president fast-track authority and for the Central America Free Trade Agreement.

Kennedy supported the Bush tax cuts and voted for the Medicare Prescription Drug Plan and the Deficit Reduction Act of 2005, while co-sponsoring three other bipartisan bills that year that would expand stem cell research. His also sponsored a line-item veto, a lifetime ban on all members of Congress becoming lobbyists, full deductibility of medical expenses, no parole for sex offenders, and Medicare Plan Enrollment Fraud Protection.

Kennedy's record of bipartisanship included partnering with 20 Democrats to lead legislation and having more than half the Democrats in the House co-sponsor bills he introduced. Such bills included:

- the Teachers for Tomorrow's Careers Act with Rush Holt from New Jersey,
- the Fair Care for the Uninsured Act with Dan Lipinski from Illinois,
- the Rural Access to Emergency Services Act with Earl Pomeroy from North Dakota,
- the Clean Alternatives for Energy Independence Act with Mark Udall from Colorado,
- the Emergency Wetlands Loan Act with Mike Thompson from California,
- the Child Support Enforcement Act with Juanita Millender-McDonald from California, and
- the SLAM Act (to increase penalties on those who traffic and sell methamphetamines) with Darlene Hooley from Oregon.

Kennedy called himself "100% pro-life". He voted in favor of the Partial-Birth Abortion Ban Act and the Unborn Victims of Violence Act. He voted to sustain Bush's veto of the Stem Cell Research Enhancement Act of 2005 while co-sponsoring three other bipartisan bills that year that would expand stem cell research.

== Post-congressional career (since 2007) ==
=== Community activities ===
In 2007 Kennedy was appointed to the President's Advisory Committee on Trade Policy and Negotiation (ACTPN). Part of the Office of the United States Trade Representative, ACTPN considers trade policy issues in the context of overall national interest.

In 2008 Kennedy, along with former Representatives Tim Penny and Bill Frenzel of Minnesota, founded the Economic Club of Minnesota (ECOM), a nonpartisan platform for national and international leaders in business, government, and public policy to present their ideas on how Minnesota can better compete in an increasingly globalized economy. The Economic Club sponsors the Bill Frenzel Champion of Free Trade Award.

Also, in 2008 he established the Frontiers of Freedom Lecture Series at the Eugene J. McCarthy Center for Public Policy at his alma mater, St. John's University.

Kennedy became a member of the Economic Club of Washington in 2013.

In 2015 Kennedy was elected to the Council on Foreign Relations.

In 2021 Kennedy was appointed as a United States Air and Space Forces Civic Leader supporting the Secretary of the Air Force.

=== Employment ===
From 2007 to 2010 Kennedy served as the global retail business development lead at Accenture, a global management consulting and technology services firm. In 2010 he formed Chartwell Strategic Advisors LLC. Kennedy's activities through Chartwell include speaking on applying 360° Vision to bridge differences between business and society; the political left and right; the United States and the world.

From 2011 to 2013 Kennedy served as an executive in residence at Johns Hopkins University's Carey Business School in Baltimore, Maryland, teaching MBA courses on corporate statesmanship, global economic systems, as well as global immersion courses in Brazil and Turkey.

In January 2012 Kennedy accepted the position of director and professor at the George Washington University Graduate School of Political Management. During his tenure the school launched two new master's programs—one in Spanish with a Latin American focus and one focused on advocacy in the global environment—and was designated as the PR Education Program of the Year by PR Week.

Between 2012 and 2017, Kennedy has also been an adjunct faculty member at Koç University in Istanbul, Turkey.

Kennedy introduced the concept of "Shapeholders" to the field of business strategy—the political, regulatory, media, and activist actors that shape a firm's opportunities and risks. Kennedy teaches how to effectively engage shapeholders both at home and abroad to profitably advance business strategies while benefiting society.

=== University of North Dakota President (2016–2019) ===
On March 15, 2016, the North Dakota State Board of Higher Education announced that Kennedy had been selected as the twelfth President of the University of North Dakota. Kennedy, who had filed his application on January 2, 2016, was in February the third of six finalists to visit the school. He succeeded president Robert Kelley, who retired in January 2016, and Ed Schafer, who served as interim President until Kennedy took office on July 1. He was inaugurated on October 10, 2016.

Notable achievements by UND during Kennedy's tenure include being ranked by U.S. News as one of the 25 Most Innovative Schools and being awarded the 2017 Big Sky Conference Presidents' Cup for outstanding student-athlete academic achievement while winning four conference championships in one year.

On May 9, 2017, Kennedy's book Shapeholders: Business Success in the Age of Activism was published by Columbia Business School.

On April 9, 2019, Kennedy was named the sole finalist for the position of President at the University of Colorado. On April 10, he stated in an email that he would accept the position.

=== University of Colorado President (2019–2021) ===
In April 2019, the University of Colorado Board of Regents named Kennedy the sole finalist for the university presidency in a 9–0 vote. After several contentious public hearings, the Board of Regents elected him to the position in a partisan 5–4 vote. Members of the CU community expressed concerns that Kennedy had insufficient experience to lead CU, and many raised specific concerns about Kennedy's ability to lead the university on issues related to diversity, equity, and inclusion. A Denver Post editorial observed, "We are displeased and a little sickened by the orchestrated opposition to Kennedy based not on his qualifications but on his political affiliation. The CU Faculty Council has set out to demonize Kennedy in a disturbing manner that bodes poorly for attracting top candidates for this role in the future. What sane individual with a résumé worthy of any world-class institution would willfully subject himself or herself to the kind of ridicule and public haranguing that Kennedy has faced in recent weeks?" Kennedy started as an employee on June 15 for a transition period with outgoing president Bruce Benson and became president on July 1.

Kennedy’s presidency was marked by several historic milestones for the university in advancing diversity and inclusion, including hiring its first systemwide chief diversity officer, the development of its first Indigenous lands recognition statement, providing support for CU Denver fulfilling its role as newly named Hispanic Servicing Institution, and expanding scholarships for less represented communities, including authorizing match funding for the Charles J. Blackwood, MD, Endowed Memorial Scholarship honoring the School of Medicine's first black graduate. Kennedy drew criticism, however, for enacting changes to university policies that some believed might limit staff and faculty members' ability to publicly support vulnerable communities and to advocate for social change. CU Boulder’s Center for Native American and Indigenous Studies issued a public rebuke after Kennedy used the phrase "Trail of Tears" colloquially to describe the challenges CU would face if it did not expand online education opportunities. The written rebuke noted that Kennedy's use of this term, demonstrated “ignorance of these atrocities at best, and willful verbal harm at worst.” Kennedy issued a formal apology within an hour of concern being raised. In 2021, two actions occurred in Boulder, ranked as America's most liberal small town, that were not replicated at the other three communities hosting CU Campuses. CU Boulder's Faculty Assembly cited the above examples and others in formally censuring Kennedy for “failure of leadership with respect to diversity, equity, and inclusion,” with 35 Assembly members supporting and 20 members opposing the motion (one abstaining). The other three campuses did not join the action. Kennedy received another rebuke from NAACP Boulder County, which in May 2021 conducted a vote of no confidence and urged the Regents to remove Kennedy from his position. Again, neither the counties that represented CU’s other three campuses, nor the statewide organization, joined the action.

Eight months into Kennedy’s presidency saw the emergence of the COVID-19 pandemic. Despite the challenges associated with navigating a global pandemic, 36 Kennedy, working with the regents, advanced several key initiatives including shepherding a coordinated approach to expanding the university’s online offerings and strengthening its technological infrastructure. The university’s other notable achievements during this time include keeping net tuition flat; 39 garnering $1.4 billion in sponsored research funding and gifts in 2020; 40 increasing graduation and retention rates; creating the Diversity, Equity and Inclusion Innovation Fund; 41 completing a strategic plan for the university; and achieving the second highest fundraising year in the university’s history – $455 million in 2020.

In January 2021, the University of Colorado Board of Regents switched partisan control for the first time in 40 years, with Democrats in the majority. On May 10, 2021, Kennedy announced that given changes in the board’s makeup and its focus, he was making plans to leave his position. On June 1, 2021, the Board of Regents announced that administrator Todd Saliman would serve as interim president of the university effective July 1, 2021. On June 17, 2021, the Board of Regents passed a resolution of appreciation for Kennedy, commending him for his service to the university and conferring upon him the title of president emeritus.

=== Wilson Center (since 2022) ===
Kennedy joined the Woodrow Wilson International Center for Scholars, a non-partisan Washington DC–based think tank, as a Global Fellow focused on geopolitical strategic competition. Kennedy was named Director of the Wilson Center’s newly established Wahba Institute for Strategic Competition aimed at shaping conversations and proposing meaningful policy reforms to strengthen American leadership in the era of great power competition.

== Electoral history ==
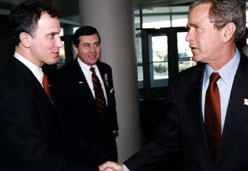
Kennedy (left) with President George W. Bush (right) and Congressman Gil Gutknecht looking on (center)

- 2006 Race for U.S. Senate
  - Amy Klobuchar (DFL), 58%
  - Mark Kennedy (R), 38%
  - Robert Fitzgerald (I), 3%
- 2004 Race for U.S. House of Representatives – 6th District
  - Mark Kennedy (R) (inc.), 54%
  - Patty Wetterling (DFL), 46%
- 2002 Race for U.S. House of Representatives – 6th District
  - Mark Kennedy (R) (inc.), 57%
  - Janet Robert (DFL), 35%
  - Dan Becker (I), 7%
- 2000 Race for U.S. House of Representatives – 2nd District
  - Mark Kennedy (R), 48%
  - David Minge (DFL) (inc.), 48%
  - Gerald Brekke (I), 3%

U.S. House of Representatives
Preceded by David Minge	Member of the U.S. House of Representatives from Minnesota's 2nd congressional district 2001–2003	Succeeded by John Kline
Preceded by Bill Luther	Member of the U.S. House of Representatives from Minnesota's 6th congressional district 2003–2007	Succeeded by Michele Bachmann
Party political offices
Preceded by Rod Grams	Republican nominee for U.S. Senator from Minnesota (Class 1); 2006	Succeeded by Kurt Bills
Academic offices
Preceded by Ed Schafer; Acting	President of the University of North Dakota; 2016–2019	Succeeded by Joshua Wynne; Acting
Preceded by Bruce D. Benson	President of the University of Colorado System; 2019–2021	Succeeded by Todd Saliman
U.S. order of precedence (ceremonial)
Preceded by Katie Porter as Former U.S. Representative	Order of precedence of the United States as Former U.S. Representative	Succeeded by Dean Phillips as Former U.S. Representative
