= Robert Kelley (academic administrator) =

11th President of the University of North Dakota
- In office July 1, 2008 – January 14, 2016
- Preceded by: Charles Kupchella
- Succeeded by: Ed Schafer (interim); Mark Kennedy

Robert O. Kelley (born 1944) was the 11th president of the University of North Dakota in Grand Forks, North Dakota. His term began on July 1, 2008. Kelley was previously dean of the College of Health Sciences and professor of medical education and public health at the University of Wyoming.

Kelley earned a B.S. in biology and chemistry from Abilene Christian University in 1965, and earned a M.S. in cell and developmental biology in 1966 from the University of California, Berkeley, where he would go on to earn his doctorate from in 1969.

As president, Kelley presided over the renaming of the Fighting Sioux as the Fighting Hawks.

In 2015, Kelley announced his retirement as president of the university, effective in January 2016. On January 14, 2016, he stepped down and was succeeded by Ed Schafer, who started his term as interim president the following day. Following his retirement, Kelley intends to move to Colorado to be closer to family.

Preceded by Charles Kupchella	President of the University of North Dakota; July 1, 2008 – January 14, 2016	Succeeded by Ed Schafer Acting
