= Osceola and Renegade =

Mascots of the Florida State University Seminoles

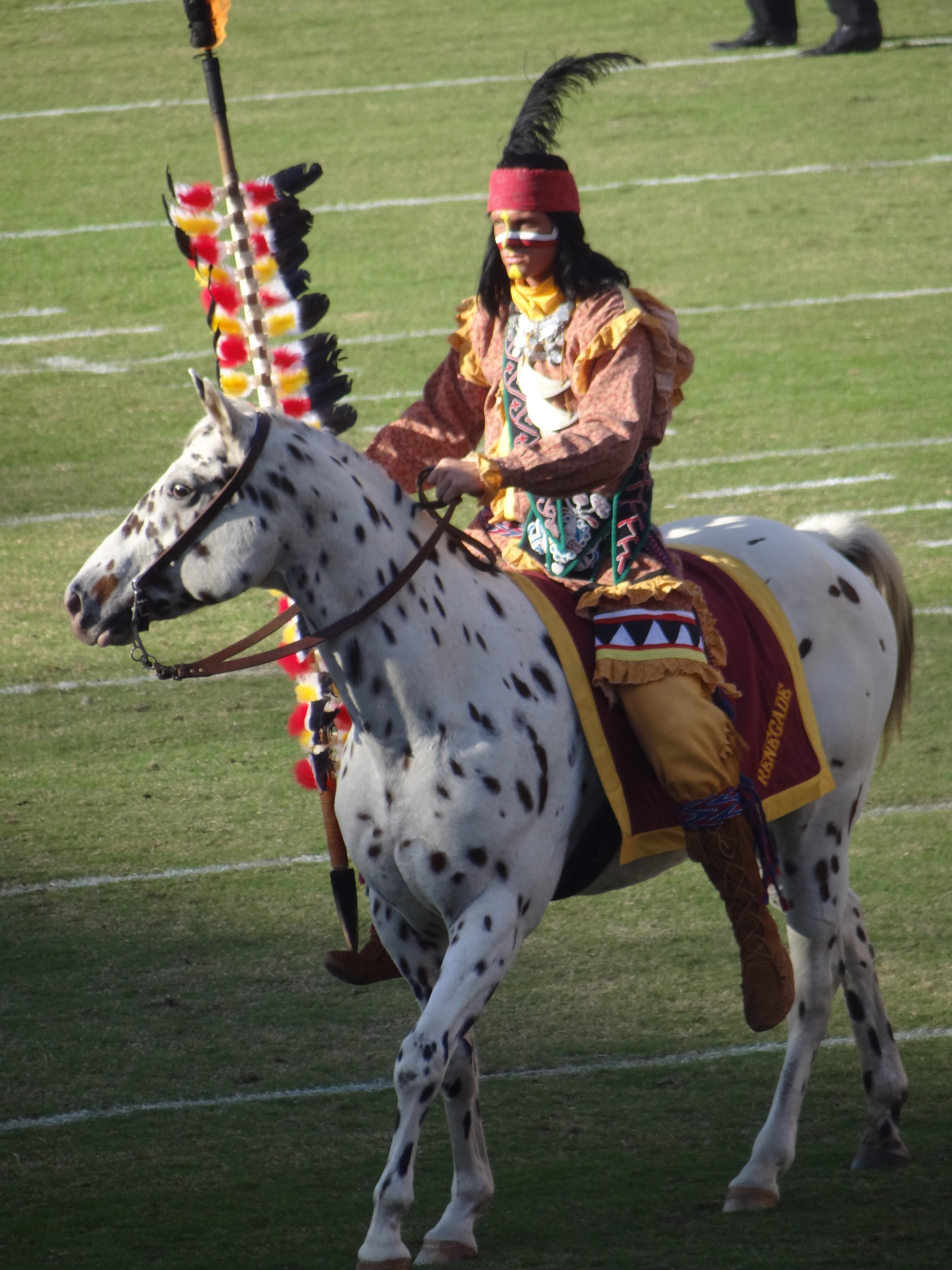
Osceola and Renegade at the Florida State game against the University of Miami in Tallahassee in November 2011

Osceola and Renegade are the official symbols of the Florida State University Seminoles. Osceola, representing the historical Seminole leader Osceola, and his Appaloosa horse Renegade introduce home football games by riding to midfield with a burning spear and planting it in the turf.

Osceola and Renegade debuted in 1978, and are the most recent of several mascots used by the school. FSU has tried to ensure a dignified depiction of Osceola. The portrayal is supported by leaders of the Seminole Tribe of Florida.

== Depiction ==
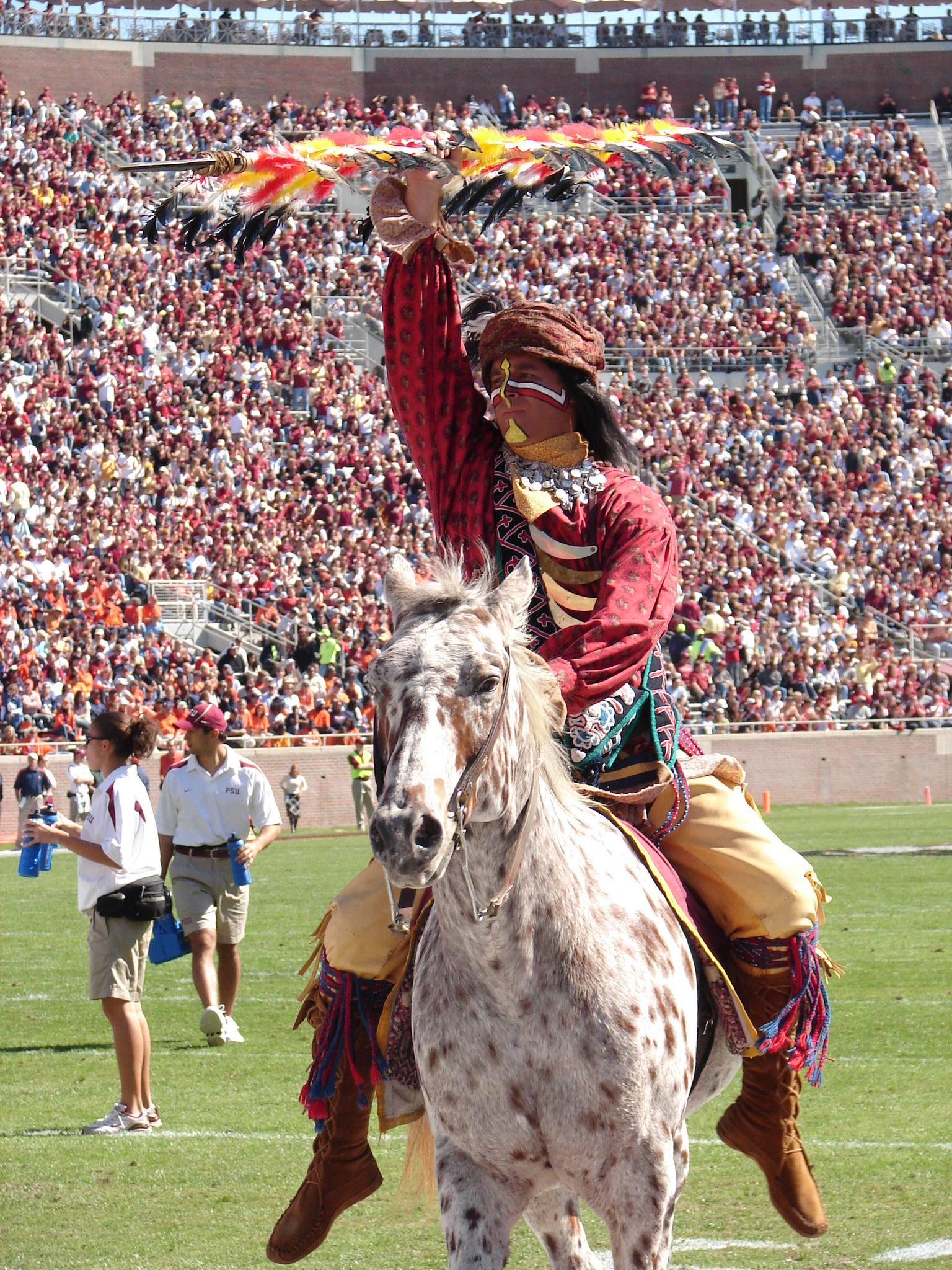
Osceola riding Renegade prior to game against Virginia in November 2006

Florida State's Osceola tradition is overseen by Allen Durham, whose father, Bill Durham, introduced it in 1978.

Osceola wears Native American-themed regalia that is designed and approved by the Seminole Tribe of Florida, consisting of leather clothing, moccasins, face paint, and a garnet bandana. He carries a feathered spear and is accompanied by Renegade, an appaloosa horse whom he rides bareback. Osceola performs at all home football games at Doak Campbell Stadium and related events like homecoming. He initiates each game by charging Renegade across the entire field then turning him around charging him to midfield while the Marching Chiefs perform the War Chant. Right after the team enters and before the first play of the game occurs, he hurls a flaming spear into the ground at the center of the field.

The Durham family personally selects and trains both the rider and horse, and it coordinates the tradition with oversight by the university. Students portraying Osceola must undertake a two-year apprenticeship, demonstrate necessary riding skill for the role as well as moral character and maintain a grade-point average of 3.0. Students receive a scholarship for portraying Osceola and are required to remain in character and abide by a set of protocols throughout all performances. There is only one Osceola impersonator at a time; as of 2018 seventeen students have played the role, with the seventeenth rider currently serving.

== History ==
=== Previous mascots ===
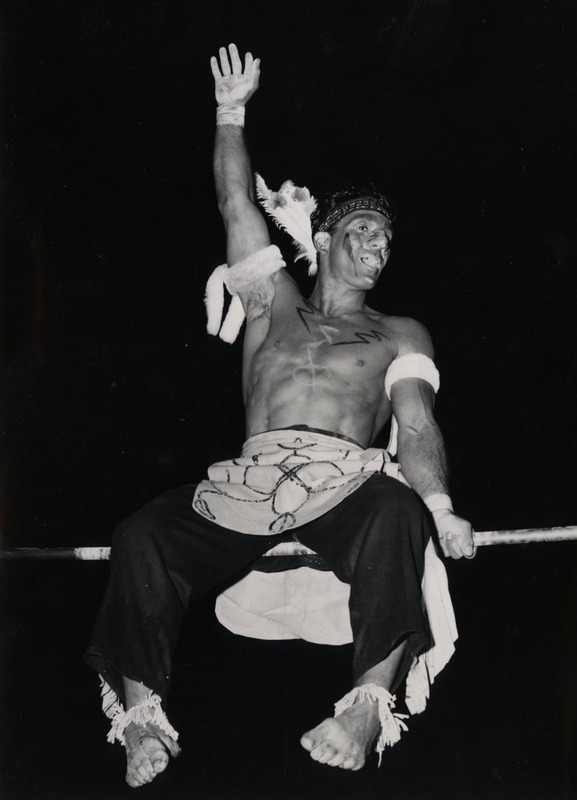
Chick Cicio as Sammy Seminole at Florida State's homecoming in 1958

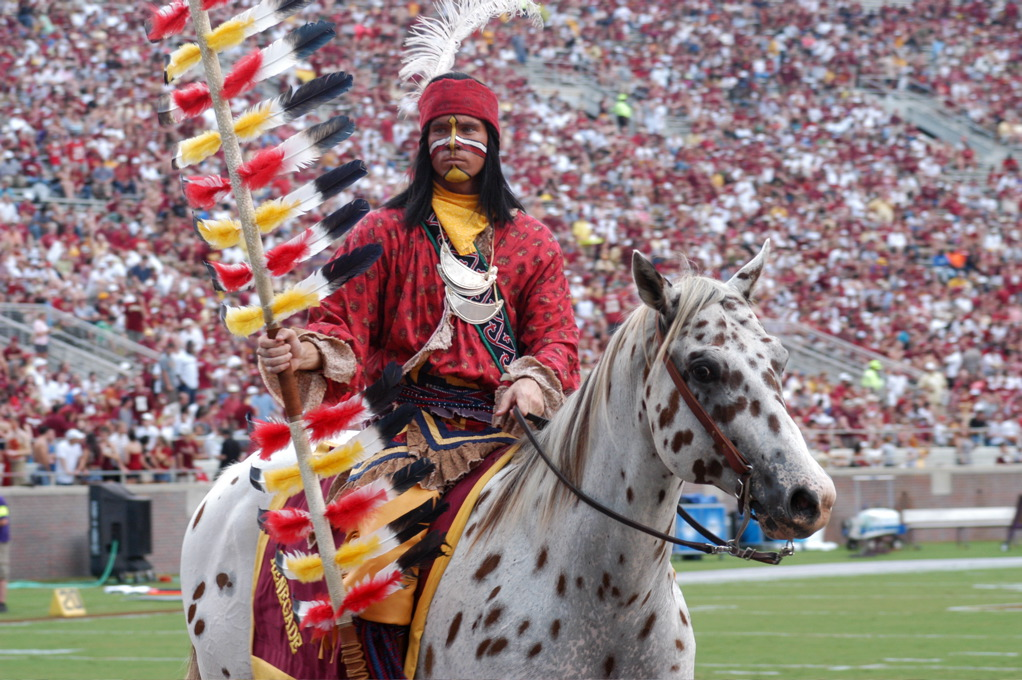
Osceola and Renegade in 2008

Florida State University adopted the Seminoles nickname in 1947, just after its reorganization from a women's college to a coed institution. The moniker was selected through a fan competition; reportedly the newly established football team liked it so much that they stuffed the ballot box to ensure its selection. Prior to the introduction of Osceola and Renegade, the Florida State Seminoles used several different Native American-themed mascots. The first was Sammy Seminole, introduced at the FSU Pow Wow in 1958 for football games. This mascot was portrayed by a white male member of the gymnastics or circus programs, who performed wild stunts in garish faux-Native American garb. The gymnastics program's sponsorship of Sammy Seminole ended in 1968, but the character was quickly reintroduced.

In the late 1960s, Chief Fullabull emerged as a mascot during basketball games. Like Sammy Seminole, he donned cartoonish Native American-themed outfits, and performed clownish stunts. Under protest from Native American groups, the character's name was altered to Chief Wampumstompum, though this did nothing to assuage the concerns of protesters. The character was replaced with a more traditionally dressed figure named Yahola, also known as the "spirit chief". All of these mascots were eventually retired, and officials decided to find a more respectful representative for the school's teams.

=== Osceola ===
In 1962, the Osceola and Renegade symbols were conceived by Bill Durham, a Tallahassee businessman and Florida State alumnus. He came up with the concept of a horseback-riding Seminole mascot when he was voted into the school's homecoming court. He returned to the idea in 1977, and won the support of Ann Bowden, wife of head football coach Bobby Bowden, who helped make the idea a reality. Durham contacted the Seminole Tribe of Florida about the project, and chairman Howard Tommie had tribe members make the first costume for Osceola. Durham provided the horse, while Bowden helped acquire the various permits necessary to allow a horse onto the field.

Osceola and Renegade debuted at a September 16, 1978 game against the Oklahoma State Cowboys. They proved quite popular, and subsequently other faux-Indian traditions arose, including the "War Chant" in 1984 and the "Tomahawk Chop" shortly after. Durham oversaw the Osceola tradition for 25 years, and over time aspects of the performance have become more refined and regulated. In 2002, Durham retired and passed his role on to his son Allen Durham, a former Osceola portrayer.

In the 1980s and 1990s, when mascots based on Native Americans became more controversial and many Native Americans and supporters protested their use, Florida State consulted with the Seminole Tribe of Florida, emphasizing that Osceola was never intended to be demeaning. Several representatives of the Seminole Tribe, including Chairman James E. Billie and Council Member Max Osceola, have given FSU their blessing to use Osceola and Seminole imagery. However, the matter remains controversial for other Florida Seminoles, as well as members of the Seminole Tribe of Oklahoma. Critics have noted a political undercurrent in the support from Florida Seminole leaders, who are heavily involved in business ventures such as Indian casinos in the state. In 2005, the NCAA added FSU to a list of schools facing potential sanctions for using "hostile and abusive" Indian mascots and names; after much deliberation, the NCAA gave FSU an exemption, citing the university's relationship with the Seminole Tribe of Florida as a major factor.

In keeping with his stoic portrayal, FSU refers to Osceola and Renegade as "symbols" rather than mascots, and does not use them for more traditional mascot activities like cheerleading and promotions. In 2012, the university developed another related mascot, an anthropomorphic horse named "Cimarron", to fill this role.

In April 2016, the FSU Student Government Association voted to discourage the wearing of Native American headdresses from sporting events as being contrary to the goal of maintaining its relationship with the Seminole Tribe, because the headdresses worn by fans are closer to those worn by Plains Indians. Although referred to as a ban, the vote did not change official university policy regarding student conduct, and imposes no penalty.

The first student to portray Osceola was Jim Kidder in 1978. Since then, six different Renegades and 18 different riders have portrayed the role.

== See also ==
- Florida State Seminoles
- Seminole Tribe of Florida
- Florida State Seminoles football
