= Griffin (mascot) =

College of William & Mary mascot

- University: The College of William & Mary
- Conference: CAA
- Description: Griffin
- Origin of name: Chosen by students and administration in 2010
- First seen: 2010
- Related mascot(s): Canisius College Golden Griffin

Reveley, also known as the Griffin, is the mascot of The College of William & Mary. A mythical creature with the head of an eagle and the body of a lion, it was announced as William & Mary's mascot by President Taylor Reveley April 6, 2010. The Griffin mascot beat out the other four finalists: a King and Queen (dual mascot), a Phoenix, a Pug, and a Wren. The college hadn't had an official mascot since the late 1970s. It was named Reveley in 2018 to honor university president Taylor Reveley upon his retirement.

== History ==
The College of William & Mary has a three-century-long history of interaction with the local Pamunkey and Mattaponi Tribes. Originally, the mascot for William and Mary were students that dressed as Native Americans because William & Mary's athletic teams used to be known as the "Indians", which was later changed to the "Tribe."

In May 2006, the NCAA ruled that the old athletic logo for William & Mary, which includes two green and gold feathers, could create an environment that is offensive to the Native American community. The NCAA decision irked many William and Mary alumni because Florida State is allowed to retain its nickname, the Seminoles, as well as its American Indian mascot (Chief Osceola) and imagery. The college's appeal regarding the use of the institution's athletic logo to the NCAA Executive Committee was rejected. The "Tribe" nickname, by itself, was found to be neither hostile nor abusive, but rather communicates ennobling sentiments of commitment, shared idealism, community and common cause. The college stated it would phase out the use of the two feathers by the fall of 2007.

Due to the changing nature of the athletic teams persona, for a short time, the college's unofficial mascot was a green and gold frog (though it was commonly referred to on campus simply as an 'amorphous green blob') called "Colonel Ebirt" ("Tribe" backwards), which was discontinued in 2005.

In 2009, William & Mary President Taylor Reveley appointed a committee of alumni, students, faculty, and staff to helm the selection for a new mascot for the college that could serve as a "unifying, fun figure on campus" as well as making sure that the new mascot "look[ed] good on T-Shirts and in costume."

In December 2009, five finalists—including a Griffin, King and Queen, the Phoenix, a Pug and the Wren—were announced from more than 800 submissions.

After announcement of the finalists, there was a month-long public feedback period on the five mascot finalists in which more than 11,000 people completed a survey. The appointed mascot committee reviewed more than 22,000 comments regarding the new mascot.

On June 12, 2018, William & Mary Athletic Director Samantha Huge announced that the Griffin would be named Reveley in honor of outgoing President Taylor Reveley, who would retire on June 30, 2018.

== Announcement and reception ==
"The Griffin has joined the Tribe. With its arrival, we now have a mascot that unites strength with intelligence, recalls our royal origins, and speaks to our deep roots in American history."

—William & Mary President Taylor Reveley on announcing the new mascot

On April 6, 2010, President Reveley announced that the college has selected the Griffin as its new mascot. President Reveley stated that the new mascot symbolizes the links between the college's historic ties to both Great Britain, whose monarchy has used the symbol of the lion in the past, and the United States, which uses the eagle as the national symbol. William and Mary Athletic Director Terry Driscoll said about the Griffin: "The griffin is half eagle and half lion, which symbolizes intelligence and strength, and this what we want our student athletes to represent." Reveley stated that a name for the Griffin would not come in the Spring 2010 semester and that "If and when the beast gets a name, we'll let the people decide."

The announcement of the new mascot was made fun of by College of William & Mary alumnus Jon Stewart, who stated on the April 8, 2010, broadcast of The Daily Show, "William and Mary has announced a new mascot. It is a griffin, which is ancient Greek for the rare pantless tailed eagle. Sorry, but in my day running through campus with no pants on was the students' job." The new mascot was also welcomed into the group of college griffin mascots in a faux "open letter" to USA Today by the Canisius College Golden Griffin, which stated "[Y]ou are a newcomer, if you don't mind my saying so, in this griffin mascot biz, this being your first full day and all. And there is one thing you should know. Please, don't take shots at other griffins."

== See also ==
- List of U.S. college mascots
- William & Mary Tribe – the athletic program of The College of William & Mary
