= North Dakota Fighting Hawks =

- University: University of North Dakota
- Nickname: Fighting Hawks; Fighting Sioux (1930–2012)
- NCAA: Division I (FCS)
- Conference: Summit League (primary); Missouri Valley (football); NCHC (Men's hockey)
- Athletic director: Bill Chaves
- Location: Grand Forks, North Dakota
- Varsity teams: 17
- Football stadium: Alerus Center
- Basketball arena: Betty Engelstad Sioux Center
- Ice hockey arena: Ralph Engelstad Arena
- Golf course: Ray Richards Golf Course
- Indoor track and field venue: Fritz Pollard Athletic Center
- Other venues: Bronson Field; Memorial Stadium; Hyslop Sports Center; Choice Health & Fitness; Oxford Softball Complex
- Colors: Kelly green and white
- Mascot: The Fighting Hawk
- Fight song: It's For You, North Dakota U Stand Up and Cheer
- Website: www.fightinghawks.com

Team NCAA championships
- Division I Ice Hockey; 1959, 1963, 1980, 1982, 1987, 1997, 2000, 2016; Division II Football; 2001; Division II Woman's Basketball; 1997, 1998, 1999

The North Dakota Fighting Hawks (formerly known as the Flickertails and the Fighting Sioux) are the athletic teams that represent the University of North Dakota (UND), located in the city of Grand Forks, North Dakota. The Fighting Hawks compete at the National Collegiate Athletic Association Division I level as a member of the Summit League. With 17 varsity teams, North Dakota is best known for its Ice Hockey team and American football team. North Dakota's main rivalries are with the North Dakota State Bison and the Minnesota Golden Gophers.

Originally in the Division II North Central Conference, UND began transitioning to NCAA's Division I in 2008 with the football program participating in the Division I Football Championship Subdivision (FCS). North Dakota is a member of the Summit League for most sports, the Missouri Valley Football Conference in football, and the National Collegiate Hockey Conference for men's hockey. The Fighting Hawks competed in the Western Athletic Conference in baseball, plus men's and women's swimming and diving, before dropping all three sports. Baseball was dropped after the 2016 season, and the swimming and diving teams were dropped after the 2016–17 season. Women's ice hockey competed in the Western Collegiate Hockey Association before also being dropped after the 2016–17 season.

On January 24, 2017, reports stated that North Dakota would leave the Big Sky Conference to join the Summit League in all sports but football beginning in 2019. The school would join the Missouri Valley Football Conference for football in 2020. The rumored changes became official on January 26, when UND, the Summit League, and the MVFC announced the Fighting Hawks' move to the Summit in 2018 (instead of 2019) and the MVFC at the reported 2020 date. During UND's transition to the MVFC, it will continue to play a full Big Sky football schedule due to contractual commitments; while the Fighting Hawks will not be eligible for the Big Sky title, games against them will count in the Big Sky football standings.

== Sports sponsored ==
Men's sports	Women's sports
Basketball	Basketball
Cross country	Cross country
Football	Golf
Golf	Soccer
Ice hockey	Softball
Tennis	Tennis
Track and field^{†}	Track and field^{†}
	Volleyball
† – Track and field includes both indoor and outdoor

=== Men's basketball ===
The Fighting Hawks Basketball team has appeared in the Division 1 tournament 1 time. The most famous athlete to come from the program is former NBA coach and basketball player Phil Jackson.

=== Football ===
The men's football home games are held in the Alerus Center. The team competes at the FCS Level in the Missouri Valley Football Conference. Prior to Joining the Missouri Valley Football Conference, the team competed in the Big Sky Conference.

=== Ice hockey (men's) ===
Having won eight national championships, the men's hockey team is easily the most recognized of UND teams. A charter member of the National Collegiate Hockey Conference, the Fighting Hawks play in the $100+ million Ralph Engelstad Arena.

=== Volleyball ===
The North Dakota Fighting Hawks volleyball are members of the NCAA Division I Summit League. The program only includes a women's team.

== Rivalries ==
=== Hockey ===
- Gophers
- Pioneers

=== Football ===
- Bison
- Coyotes

=== All ===
- North Dakota State Bison
- South Dakota State Jackrabbits
- South Dakota Coyotes

== Former sports ==
The wrestling program was discontinued in 1998. The baseball program dating to 1889 was cancelled at the conclusion of the 2016 season. The women's hockey program was cancelled at the conclusion of the 2016–17 season.

- Baseball
- Men's and Women's Swimming and Diving
- Women's Golf
- Wrestling
- Women's Hockey

== Athletics hall of fame ==
The Letterwinners Hall of Fame recognizes the efforts and achievements of former UND student-athletes, coaches, and other supporters of UND athletics. Inductees are selected by the UND Letterwinners Association and representatives of the UND athletic department. The Hall of Fame induction ceremony, sponsored by the UND Letterwinners Association, is held each fall in conjunction with a football game. The Hall of Fame is located on the upper concourse at the south end of the Ralph Engelstad Arena.

== Nickname ==
UND's nickname was originally The Flickertails, but was unofficially changed to "The Sioux" in 1930. UND's former athletic logo, revealed in 1999, a Native American figure, was designed by Bennett Brien, a local artist and UND graduate of Ojibwa ethnicity. After more than a decade of controversy, the name and logo were retired in 2012. On November 18, 2015, it was revealed at a press conference held by President Robert Kelley that Fighting Hawks, with 57.24% of the vote, would become the new university nickname. The controversy surrounding the former "Fighting Sioux" nickname was later documented in the film Fighting Over Sioux.

== Notable Athletes ==
- Murray Baron – former NHL defenseman
- Ryan Bayda – former player in the NHL Carolina Hurricanes
- Ed Belfour – former NHL goaltender and member of the Hockey Hall of Fame
- Jason Blake – former NHL player
- Brock Boeser – current NHL player with the Vancouver Canucks
- Drake Caggiula – current NHL player with the Edmonton Oilers
- Taylor Chorney – former NHL player
- Dave Christian – member of the 1980 Olympic ice hockey team that beat the USSR in the "Miracle on Ice" game
- Mike Commodore – former NHL player
- Geno Crandall - basketball player with Hapoel Be'er Sheva in the Israeli Basketball Premier League
- Aaron Dell – current NHL player with the San Jose Sharks
- Ryan Duncan – winner of the 2007 Hobey Baker Award
- Derek Forbort – current NHL player with the Boston Bruins
- Rhett Gardner – current NHL player with the Philadelphia Flyers
- Pablo Garza – basketball player; professional mixed martial artist; former UFC Featherweight
- Matt Greene – former NHL player
- Rocco Grimaldi – current AHL player with the Chicago Wolves
- David Hale – former Phoenix Coyotes player in the NHL
- Dave Hakstol – current head coach of the Seattle Kraken
- Quinton Hooker (born 1995) - basketball player in the Israeli Basketball Premier League
- Tony Hrkac – former NHL player and 1987 Hobey Baker Award winner
- Phil Jackson – former NBA player and coach
- Ben Jacobson – head men's basketball coach at the University of Northern Iowa
- Greg Johnson – former player in the NHL
- Luke Johnson (ice hockey) – current KHL player with Magnitogorsk Metallurg
- Ryan Johnson – former player in the NHL
- Milson Jones – former CFL running back
- Tyson Jost – current NHL player with the Buffalo Sabres
- Jim Kleinsasser – former Minnesota Vikings NFL player
- Chris Kuper – former Denver Broncos NFL player and current coach
- Paul LaDue – current NHL player with the New York Islanders
- Jocelyne Lamoureux – women's hockey gold medalist at the 2018 Winter Olympics
- Monique Lamoureux – women's hockey gold medalist at the 2018 Winter Olympics
- Jim LeClair – former Cincinnati Bengals NFL player
- Brian Lee – former Ottawa Senators player in the NHL
- Brad Malone – current NHL player with the Edmonton Oilers
- Errol Mann – former Detroit Lions NFL player
- Gene Murphy – North Dakota football player and head coach
- Chad Mustard – former Denver Broncos NFL player
- Brock Nelson – current NHL player for the New York Islanders
- Travis O'Neel – UND football captain of 2001 National Championship Team
- Dave Osborn – former Minnesota Vikings NFL player
- T. J. Oshie – current Washington Capitals player in the NHL
- Zach Parise – current Colorado Avalanche player in the NHL
- Joe Polo – Olympic gold medalist in curling at the 2018 Winter Olympics
- Tucker Poolman – current NHL player with the Vancouver Canucks
- Pete Retzlaff – former Philadelphia Eagles NFL player
- Nick Schmaltz – current NHL player with the Arizona Coyotes
- Lawrie Skolrood – former CFL player
- Craig Smith (basketball, born 1972) – men's basketball coach at Utah State Aggies men's basketball
- Monte Smith – former Denver Broncos NFL player
- Drew Stafford – former NHL player
- Troy Stecher – current NHL player with the Arizona Coyotes
- Dave Tippett – former NHL player and coach
- Jonathan Toews – former Chicago Blackhawks player in the NHL
- Landon Wilson – former Dallas Stars player in the NHL
- Travis Zajac – former New York Islanders player in the NHL

== See also ==
- University of North Dakota Sports Network
- North Dakota Fighting Hawks baseball
- Fighting Over Sioux, documentary about the mascot controversy
