= North Dakota Fighting Sioux controversy =

College nickname and logo controversy

The Fighting Sioux logo, used from 1999 until retirement in 2012

The North Dakota Fighting Sioux controversy refers to the controversy surrounding the now retired nickname and logo of the North Dakota Fighting Hawks, the athletic teams that represented the University of North Dakota (UND) based in Grand Forks, North Dakota.

Critics of the name called it a racist stereotype, while supporters maintained that it was inoffensive and a source of pride. Over the years, the debate proved to be a divisive issue.

The movement to keep the nickname and logo was led by Native Americans of Siouan descent from both the Standing Rock and Spirit Lake Sioux Nations, UND alumni, sports fans, and athletic players and officials, as well as the university administration for a time. The campaign to change the nickname and logo was led by Native Americans and student organizations, as well as many UND faculty members.

The "Fighting Sioux" nickname and logo was added to a list of "hostile and abusive" representations of Native Americans by the National Collegiate Athletic Association (NCAA) in 2005, although some controversy predates that action.

In 2008, the NCAA and UND agreed to retire the university's Fighting Sioux name unless UND received approval from both the Standing Rock and Spirit Lake Sioux tribes by the end of 2010. The Spirit Lake tribal members approved retaining the name, but the Standing Rock tribal council did not allow their members to vote on retaining the name. A new nickname, the "Fighting Hawks", was selected in 2015.

== History ==
In 1999, a bill was introduced in the North Dakota House of Representatives to eliminate the nickname, but the bill died in committee. In 2000, twenty-one Native American-related programs, departments, and organizations at UND signed a statement opposing the continued use of the nickname and logo, saying that it did not honor them or their culture.

Former Fighting Sioux hockey player and wealthy alumnus Ralph Engelstad donated $100 million for the construction of the Ralph Engelstad Arena. One of Engelstad's conditions for his donation was that the University keep the Fighting Sioux name indefinitely. Engelstad placed thousands of Fighting Sioux logos in numerous places throughout the arena to make physical removal of the logo very costly if attempted. The arena opened in 2001.

=== Retirement of "Fighting Sioux" ===
In 2005, the NCAA made a decision to sanction 19 schools, including UND, with Native American logos and/or nicknames that were deemed to be "hostile and abusive." The sanctions would not allow these schools to use their names or logos in post-season play nor would they be able to host post-season championships. After an unsuccessful appeal to reverse the sanctions, UND started to pursue its legal options. On June 15, 2006, after consulting with North Dakota Attorney General Wayne Stenehjem, the Board of Higher Education elected 8–0 to authorize Stenehjem to sue the NCAA for penalizing the UND over its Fighting Sioux nickname and logo. In November 2006, UND was granted a preliminary injunction to prevent the NCAA from enforcing the rule. On October 26, 2007, a settlement between UND and the NCAA was reached preventing the case from going to trial. The settlement gave UND three years to gain support from the state's Sioux tribes to continue to use the Fighting Sioux nickname and logo. If that support was not granted at the end of the three years, UND agreed to retire the Fighting Sioux nickname and logo, remove most of the existing Fighting Sioux imagery in campus facilities, and pick a new nickname and logo to represent UND's athletic teams. UND was the only college required under the NCAA policy to gain the support of more than one Native American tribe to continue use of a Native American name and likeness.

On May 14, 2009, the North Dakota State Board of Higher Education approved a motion directing UND to retire "Fighting Sioux" nickname and logo, effective October 1, 2009, with full retirement to be completed no later than August 1, 2010. This directive was to be suspended, if, prior to October 1, 2009, the Standing Rock and Spirit Lake Sioux tribes gave namesake approval consistent with the terms of the Settlement Agreement. Spirit Lake voted to keep the name, but the Standing Rock tribal counsel would not allow a vote to take place. On April 8, 2010, the Board unconditionally ordered UND to retire the Fighting Sioux nickname at the end of the 2010–11 season.

The North Dakota State Board of Higher Education announced on April 8, 2010, that the Fighting Sioux nickname would be retired after the 2010–2011 athletic season. The North Dakota State Board of Higher Education voted unanimously on Monday, May 10, to extend the deadline for the University of North Dakota to retire its nickname and logo to Aug. 15, 2011.

On March 11, 2011, by a vote of 28–15, the North Dakota Senate approved legislation ordering the University of North Dakota to retain its controversial Fighting Sioux nickname and Indian-head logo. Governor Jack Dalrymple signed the Fighting Sioux bill into law the following week. This law was subsequently repealed during a special session of the legislature in November 2011, after the NCAA told state representatives that sanctions would be enforced.

On November 1, 2011, the Spirit Lake Tribe filed a lawsuit against the NCAA in an attempt to reverse their policy against the use of American Indian imagery. The lawsuit was thrown out in May 2012.

On February 8, 2012, it was announced that supporters of the "Fighting Sioux" nickname received 17,213 signatures on a petition that sent the issue to a statewide vote in June. The university then resumed using the nickname.

On March 1, 2012, in a letter sent to the University, the NCAA reiterated its current policies concerning participation in NCAA championships and stated that the school risks losing the right to play postseason games at home if its athletes, cheerleaders or band display the nickname "Fighting Sioux" or the American Indian head logo. In addition, since "NCAA policy requires that student-athletes, band, cheerleading, dance and mascot uniforms and paraphernalia not have hostile or abusive racial/ethnic/national original references", any UND teams participating in postseason games that do not adhere to this would risk forfeiture of the game and "the NCAA reserves its right to seek reimbursement for expenses incurred". UND thus could have retained the "Fighting Sioux" name and logo for regular season play without sanction from the NCAA, and avoided NCAA sanction during playoffs by not displaying the name and logo for post-season contests.

On April 3, 2012, UND President Robert Kelley issued a statement warning about the negative consequences to UND if the statewide vote in June results in continued use of the nickname.

On June 11, 2012, the naming issue was up for a statewide vote, on the ballot as Referendum Measure #4, to keep or retire the nickname. A sizable majority, 67.35%, of North Dakota voters chose to uphold the North Dakota Legislature's November 2011 repeal of the law directing retention of the "Fighting Sioux" name and symbol, setting UND down the path to retire the "Fighting Sioux" name and American Indian head logo. Some controversy surrounding this vote arose in the manner in which it was placed on the ballot. A "yes" vote was not a vote to keep the "Fighting Sioux" name and symbol; it was actually a vote to allow the North Dakota Legislature's November 2011 repeal to stand. A "no" vote would have formally nullified their November repeal and kept the original law directing UND to use the "Fighting Sioux" name and symbol in effect. This nuance was not clearly understood by all voters in the June 12th, 2012 primary election. It remains unclear how many voters casting a "yes" vote actually had the intent of voting for UND to keep using the "Fighting Sioux" name and symbol.

On June 14, 2012, the state Board of Higher Education voted to get rid of the University of North Dakota's moniker and Indian head logo. The university was prohibited from adopting a new team name until 2015.

On July 21, 2015, the university submitted five names options to be approved by UND president Robert Kelley to be put to a public vote, with the names being Fighting Hawks, Nodaks, North Stars, Roughriders, and Sundogs. The popular option of remaining "North Dakota" was dropped from the list arbitrarily by Kelley so that it could not be voted on alongside the other name choices.

Up to 82,000 eligible voters, including students, alumni, university faculty and staff, donors and season-ticket holders, were able to cast online ballots October 19–23, 2015 to select the new UND nickname. The choices, selected by a committee from among hundreds of submitted names, are: Fighting Hawks, Nodaks, North Stars, Roughriders, and Sundogs. If one name does not get a majority vote, a run-off will be held between the two top choices. Results revealed that there were three finalists: Nodaks, Roughriders, and Fighting Hawks, with the latter topping the first vote, yet it did not receive the required majority. Another run-off vote was required, with Fighting Hawks and Roughriders being the two finalists from the second vote. On November 18, 2015 it was revealed at a press conference held by President Robert Kelly that Fighting Hawks, with 57.24% of the vote (15,670 votes or 19.1% of eligible voters), would become the new University Nickname. Use of the nickname was to begin immediately.

As part of the 2007 settlement agreement between UND and the NCAA, the "Fighting Sioux" trademark was to remain active and retained by UND or given to a Sioux tribe. Trademarks must be used to remain active, and thus Fighting Sioux clothing and other memorabilia remains available after retirement for purchase.

== Status ==
Initially, the new nickname was greeted with booing so its use was avoided in the arena in the early days after the name change. Resistance to the new nickname comes mainly from hockey fans. A substantial number attend the games in their "Sioux" jerseys. Counterfeit Sioux jerseys are available as legitimate ones are no longer sold. Fighting Hawks merchandise was sold a year after the name change.

To retain the trademark for the old name and logo and to prevent others from producing "Fighting Sioux" merchandise, the university must produce a limited series of items known as the "Dacotah Legacy Collection."

A new logo, featuring a hawk head profile over "ND", was approved and was first used on the team helmets for the first football game September 1, 2016. Objections to the logo from some fans immediately followed.

The events and arguments surrounding the nickname controversy were later documented in the film Fighting Over Sioux.
