= 2006 United States House of Representatives elections in Minnesota =

- November 7, 2006

All 8 Minnesota seats to the United States House of Representatives
	Majority party	Minority party
Party	Democratic (DFL)	Republican
Last election	4 seats, 51.42%	4 seats, 45.42%
Seats before	4	4
Seats won	5	3
Seat change	▲1	▼1
Popular vote	1,152,621	924,636
Percentage	52.90%	42.43%
Swing	▲1.48%	▼2.99%

Democratic
40–50%
50–60%
60–70%
70–80%
80–90%
Republican
40–50%
50–60%
60–70%

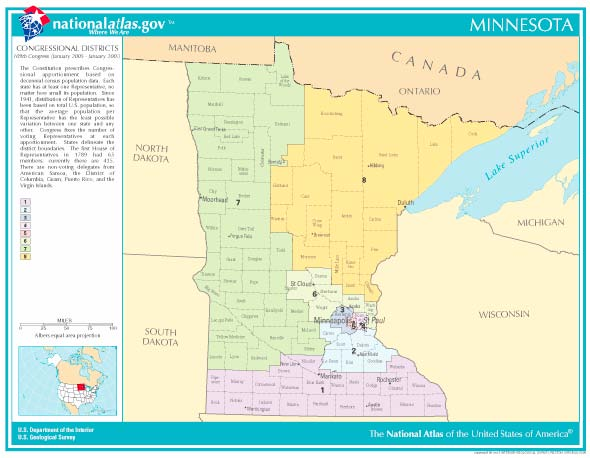
Map of Minnesota showing all eight districts

The 2006 congressional elections in Minnesota were held on November 7, 2006, to determine who would represent the state of Minnesota in the United States House of Representatives.

Minnesota had eight seats in the House, apportioned according to the 2000 United States census. Representatives are elected for two-year terms; those elected served in the 110th Congress from January 3, 2007, until January 3, 2009. The election coincided with the Senate election and the gubernatorial election.

== Overview ==
=== Statewide ===
Party	Candidates	Votes		Seats		
Party	Candidates	No.	%	No.	+/–	%
Democratic-Farmer-Labor	8	1,152,621	52.90	5	▲1	62.50
Republican	8	924,636	42.43	3	▼1	37.50
Independence	3	85,815	3.94	0	Steady	0.0
Unity	1	5,508	0.25	0	Steady	0.0
Green	1	4,792	0.23	0	Steady	0.0
Constitution	1	3,303	0.15	0	Steady	0.0
Write-in	8	2,299	0.11	0	Steady	0.0
Total	30	2,178,974	100.0	8	Steady	100.0

Popular vote
Democratic	52.90%
Republican	42.43%
Independence	3.94%
Other	0.73%

House seats
Democratic	62.50%
Republican	37.50%

=== By district ===
Results of the 2006 United States House of Representatives elections in Minnesota by district:

District	Democratic		Republican		Others		Total		Result
District	Votes	%	Votes	%	Votes	%	Votes	%	Result
District 1	141,556	52.74%	126,486	47.12%	379	0.14%	268,421	100.0%	Democratic gain
District 2	116,343	40.04%	163,269	56.20%	10,928	3.76%	290,540	100.0%	Republican hold
District 3	99,588	35.04%	184,333	64.85%	323	0.11%	284,244	100.0%	Republican hold
District 4	172,096	69.54%	74,797	30.23%	573	0.23%	247,466	100.0%	Democratic hold
District 5	136,060	55.56%	52,263	21.34%	56,582	23.10%	244,905	100.0%	Democratic hold
District 6	127,144	42.07%	151,248	50.05%	23,796	7.88%	302,188	100.0%	Republican hold
District 7	179,164	69.66%	74,557	28.99%	3,473	1.35%	257,194	100.0%	Democratic hold
District 8	180,670	63.61%	97,683	34.39%	5,663	1.99%	284,016	100.0%	Democratic hold
Total	1,152,621	52.90%	924,636	42.43%	101,717	4.67%	2,178,974	100.0%	

== District 1 ==
2006 Minnesota's 1st congressional district election
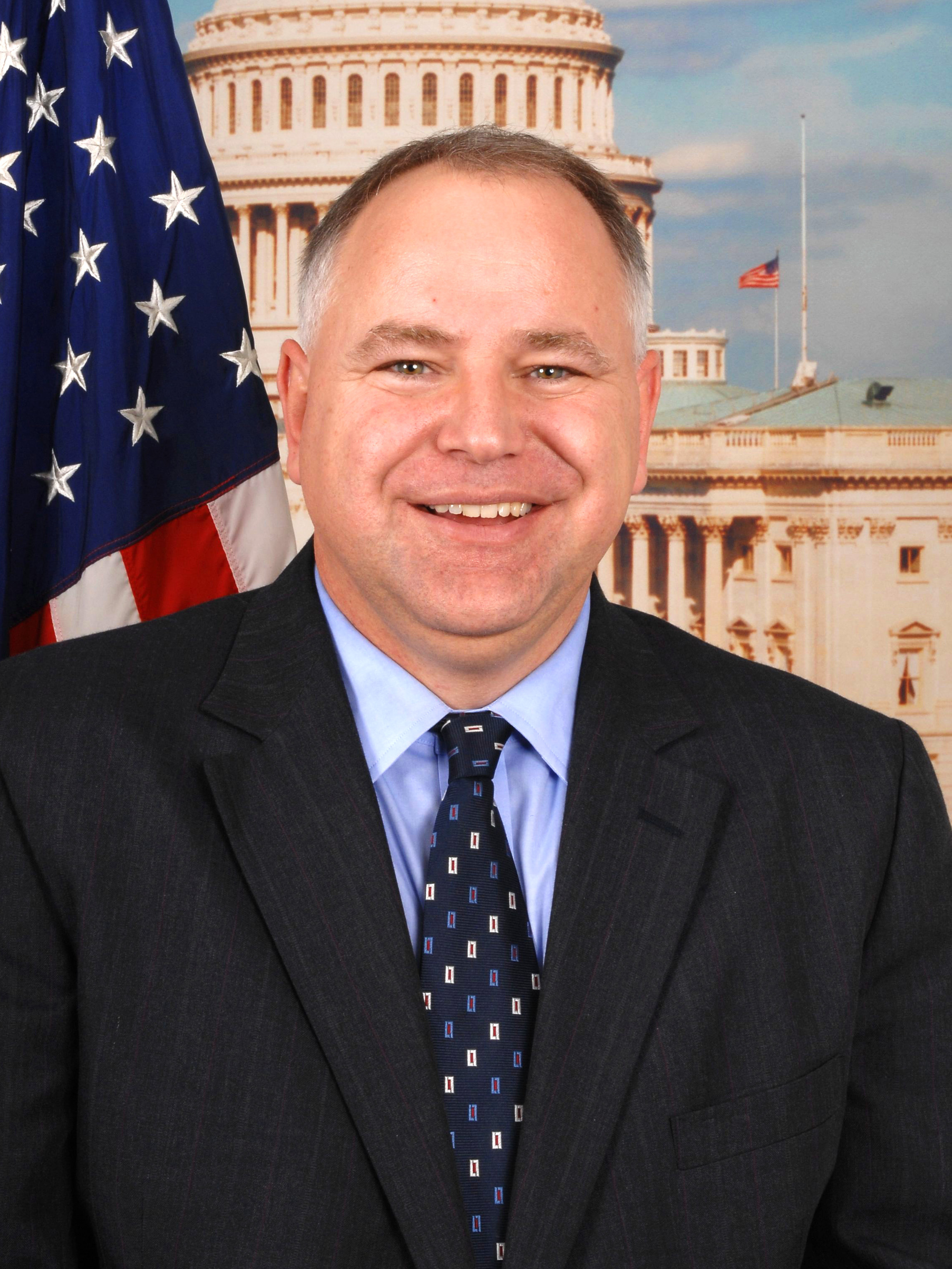

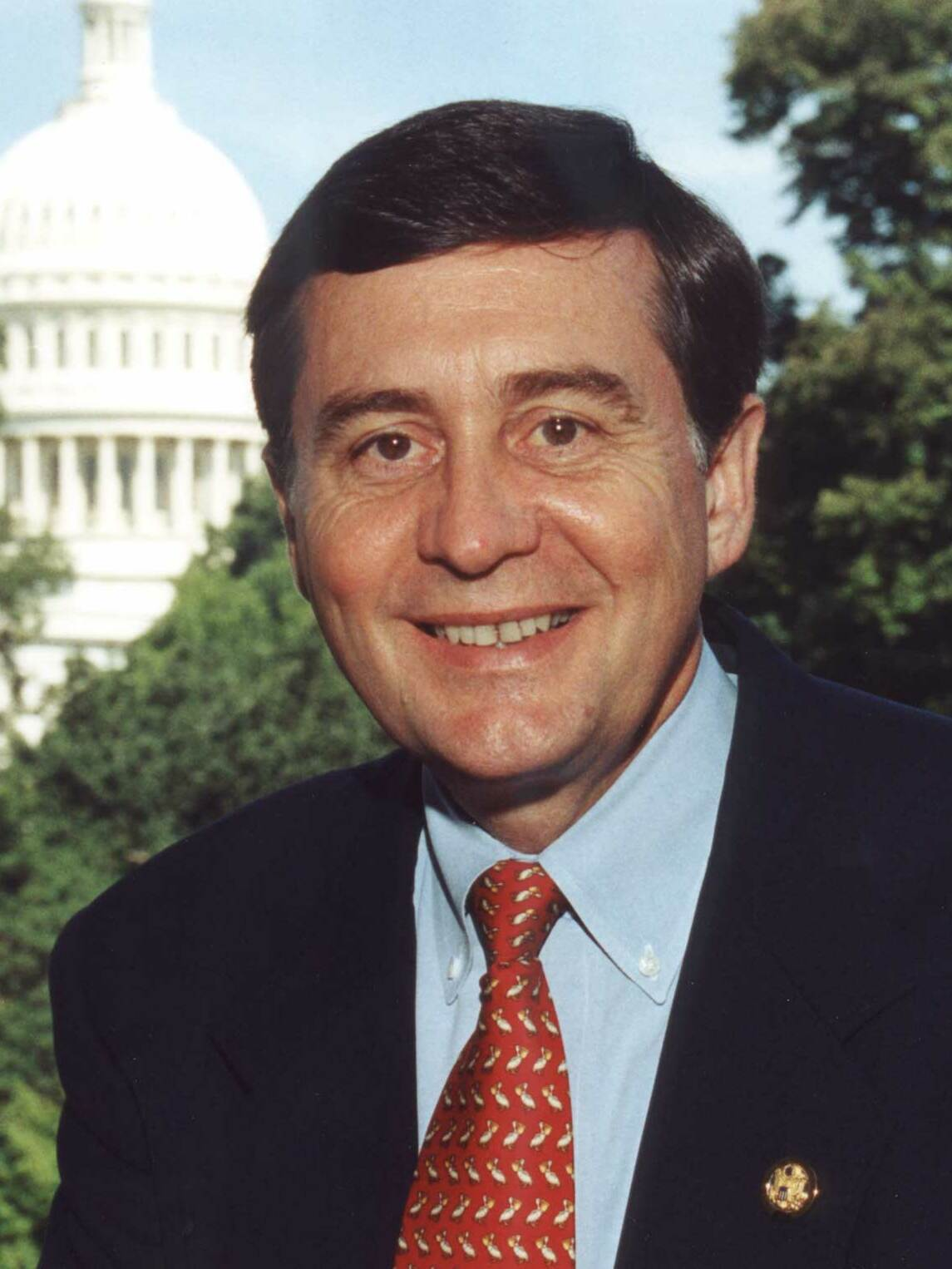
Nominee	Tim Walz	Gil Gutknecht
Party	Democratic (DFL)	Republican
Popular vote	141,556	126,486
Percentage	52.7%	47.1%
- Walz: 50–60% 60–70% 70–80% 80–90% >90% Gutknecht: 40–50% 50–60% 60–70% 70–80% 80–90% >90% Tie: 50% No votes
U.S. Representative before election
Gil Gutknecht
Republican
Elected U.S. Representative
Tim Walz
Democratic (DFL)

Incumbent Republican Gil Gutknecht, who had represented the district since 1995, ran for re-election. He was re-elected with 59.6% of the vote in 2004 and the district had a PVI of R+1. This was the first election for this seat since 1992 to be won by a Democrat.

=== Republican primary ===
==== Candidates ====
===== Nominee =====
- Gil Gutknecht, incumbent U.S. Representative

===== Eliminated in primary =====
- Gregory Mikkelson, small business owner, farmer, Green nominee for this seat in 2002 and Independence nominee for this seat in 2004

==== Results ====
Republican Primary Election
Party	Candidate	Votes	%
Republican	Gil Gutknecht (Incumbent)	24,725	87.3
Republican	Gregory Mikkelson	3,600	12.7
Total votes		28,325	100.0

=== Democratic primary ===
==== Candidates ====
===== Nominee =====
- Tim Walz, high school teacher and retired Army National Guard NCO

==== Results ====
Democratic Primary Election
Party	Candidate	Votes	%
Democratic (DFL)	Tim Walz	26,475	100.0
Total votes		26,475	100.0

=== General election ===
==== Campaign ====
Walz accused Gutknecht of extending tax cuts to "Wall Street" and sought to tie Gutknecht to the unpopular President George W. Bush. A centerpiece of Walz's campaign was his opposition to the Iraq War, as the war's popularity was on the decline.

===== Endorsements =====
Gil Gutknecht (R)

Organizations

- U.S. Chamber of Commerce
Tim Walz (D)

Labor unions

- AFL-CIO

Organizations

- Democratic Congressional Campaign Committee "Red to Blue" Program

Newspapers and publications

- Esquire

Individuals

- Wesley Clark, retired Army General and 2004 democratic presidential candidate

==== Debate ====
- Complete video of debate, October 26, 2006

==== Polling ====
Poll source	Date(s) administered	Sample size (Note: Key: A – all adults RV – registered voters LV – likely voters V – unclear)	Margin of error	Gil Gutknecht (R)	Tim Walz (D)	Undecided
RT Strategies and Constituent Dynamics	October 24–26, 2006	1,042 (LV)	±3.0%	50%	47%	3%
RT Strategies and Constituent Dynamics	October 8–10, 2006	1,024 (LV)	±3.1%	48%	47%	5%

==== Predictions ====
Source	Ranking	As of
The Cook Political Report	Tossup	November 6, 2006
Rothenberg	Tossup	November 6, 2006
Sabato's Crystal Ball	Tilt R	November 6, 2006
Real Clear Politics	Lean R	November 7, 2006
CQ Politics	Lean R	November 7, 2006

==== Results ====
Walz upset Gutknecht by a margin of 5.6%. After his defeat, Gutknecht admitted to Politico that he had been caught "off guard" by Walz.

Minnesota's 1st Congressional district election, 2006
Party	Candidate	Votes	%
Democratic (DFL)	Tim Walz	141,556	52.7
Republican	Gil Gutknecht (Incumbent)	126,486	47.1
Write-in		379	0.1
Majority			
Total votes		268,421	100.0
Democratic (DFL) gain from Republican			

==== Finances ====
===== Campaigns =====
Candidate (party)	Raised	Spent	Cash on hand
Gil Gutknecht (R)	$1,364,284	$1,723,707	$1,184
Tim Walz (DFL)	$1,299,267	$1,227,636	$78,103

===== Outside Spending =====
Candidate (party)	Supported	Opposed
Gil Gutknecht (R)	$137,425	$915,190
Tim Walz (DFL)	$546,447	$440,382

== District 2 ==
2006 Minnesota's 2nd congressional district election
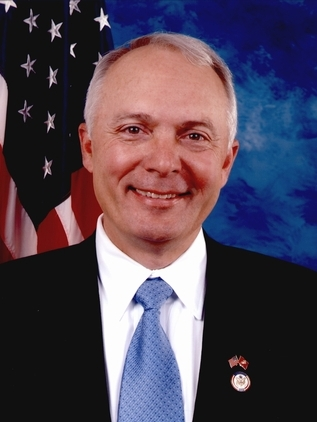

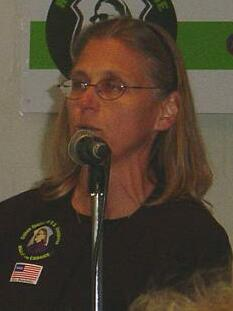
Nominee	John Kline	Coleen Rowley
Party	Republican	Democratic (DFL)
Popular vote	163,269	116,343
Percentage	56.2%	40.0%
- Precinct results Kline: 40–50% 50–60% 60–70% 70–80% Rowley: 40–50% 50–60% 60–70% 70–80% >90% No votes
U.S. Representative before election
John Kline
Republican
Elected U.S. Representative
John Kline
Republican

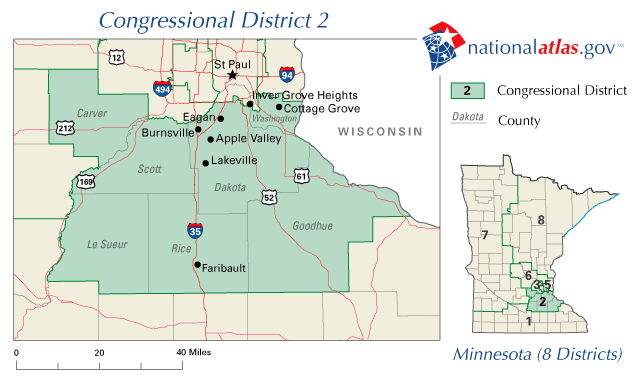

This district spans the width of the entire southern metro area and contains all of Carver, Scott, Le Sueur, Goodhue and Rice Counties and most of Dakota County. Incumbent Republican John Kline, who had represented the district since 2003, ran for re-election. He was re-elected with 56.4% of the vote in 2004. The district had a PVI of R+3.

=== Republican primary ===
==== Candidates ====
===== Nominee =====
- John Kline, incumbent U.S. Representative

=== Democratic primary ===
In May 2005, Rowley announced that she was considering running against incumbent Kline. At the time of her announcement, she had been living in Apple Valley, Minnesota, for 15 years and had formerly voted and identified as a Republican, but on June 27, she announced that she was entering the race as a DFLer, and on July 6 officially kicked off her campaign at her home. On August 18, Rowley attended a vigil in Crawford, Texas, outside President George W. Bush's ranch requesting that the president meet with Cindy Sheehan to answer Sheehan's questions about the War in Iraq and the death of Sheehan's son, Casey.

==== Candidates ====
===== Nominee =====
- Coleen Rowley, former FBI special agent and political activist

===== Withdrawn =====
- Sharon Marko, state senator

=== Independence primary ===
==== Candidates ====
===== Nominee =====
- Doug Williams, perennial candidate

=== General election ===
==== Campaign ====
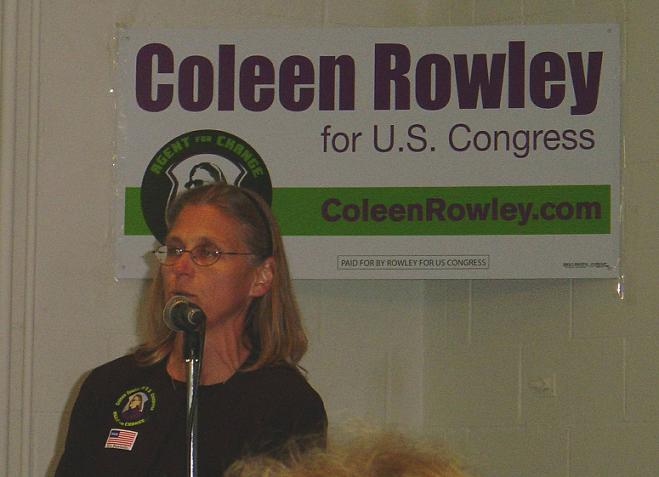
Coleen Rowley at her rally in Rosemount, Minnesota, on September 17, 2006

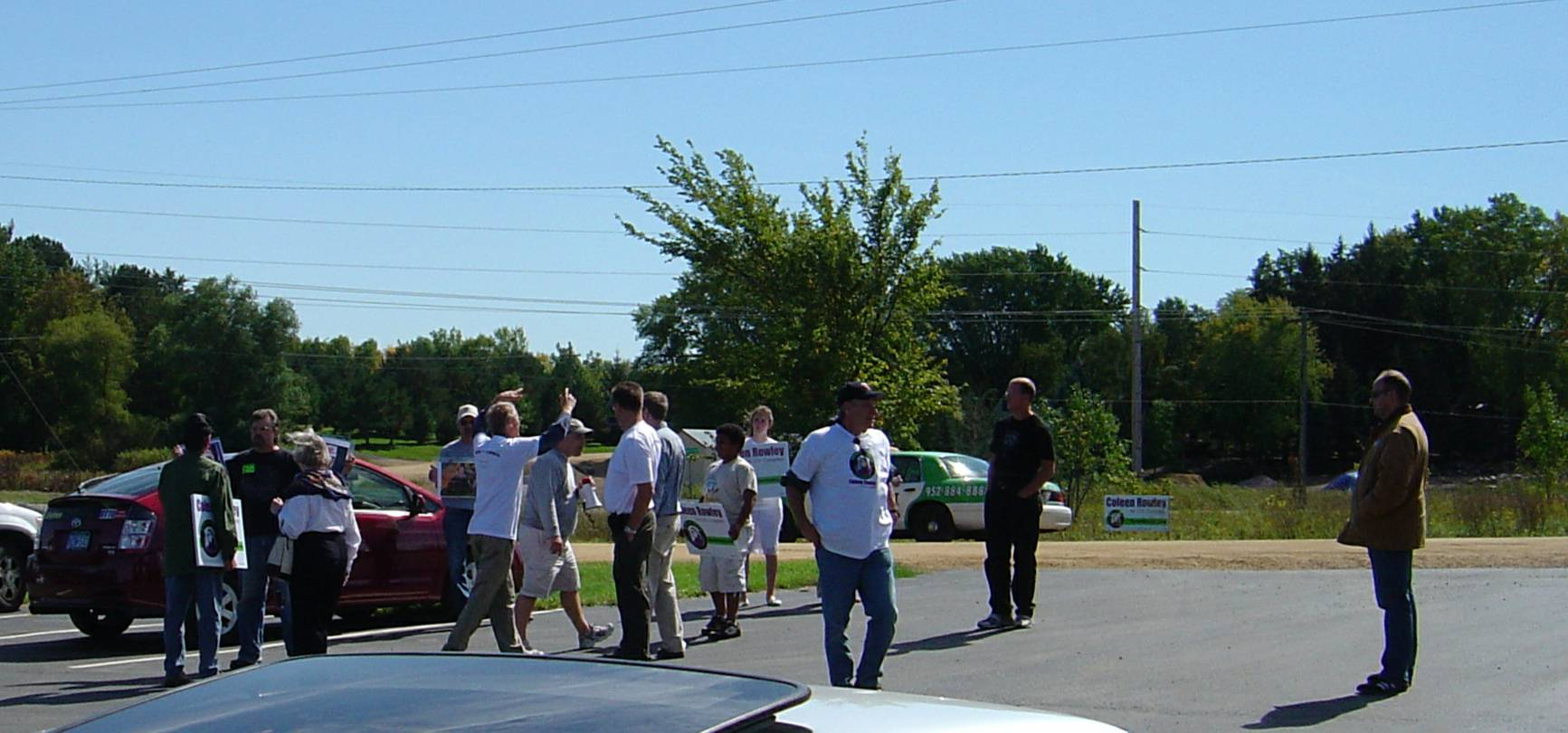
Protestors at a Rowley rally in Rosemount, Minnesota, on September 17, 2006

On January 3, 2006, an unauthorized professionally retouched image appeared on Rowley's campaign website, depicting Kline, a retired Marine Corps colonel, as Colonel Klink from Hogan's Heroes. Kline objected to the photo and the Rowley campaign removed the image the same day and initiated an investigation. Rowley quickly apologized.

The Rowley campaign found financing difficult, as opposing an incumbent conservative such as Kline in a conservative district, despite the national environment favouring the Democrats, did not attract money from the most robust Democratic resources, such as the DNC. Ultimately Kline's campaign achieved a 2–1 advantage in raising funds.

==== Endorsements ====
Coleen Rowley (D)

U.S. Representatives

- John Murtha (D-PA-12)

Labor unions

- AFL-CIO

Newspapers and publications

- Esquire

Individuals

- Wesley Clark, retired Army General, 2004 democratic presidential candidate

==== Polling ====
Poll source	Date(s) administered	Sample size	Margin of error	John Kline (R)	Coleen Rowley (D)	Douglas Williams (I)	Undecided
SurveyUSA (KSTP-TV)	October 29–31, 2006	597 (LV)	±4.1%	54%	36%	7%	2%
SurveyUSA (KSTP-TV)	October 10–15, 2006	519 (LV)	±4.4%	50%	42%	5%	3%

==== Predictions ====
Source	Ranking	As of
The Cook Political Report	Safe R	November 6, 2006
Rothenberg	Safe R	November 6, 2006
Sabato's Crystal Ball	Likely R	November 6, 2006
Real Clear Politics	Safe R	November 7, 2006
CQ Politics	Likely R	November 7, 2006

==== Results ====
Minnesota's 2nd Congressional district election, 2006
Party	Candidate	Votes	%
Republican	John Kline	163,269	56.2
Democratic (DFL)	Coleen Rowley	116,343	40.0
Independence	Douglas Williams	10,802	3.7
Write-in		126	0.1
Majority			
Total votes		290,540	100.0
Republican hold			

==== Finances ====
===== Campaigns =====
Candidate (party)	Raised	Spent	Cash on hand
John Kline (R)	$1,495,470	$1,478,465	$42,933
Coleen Rowley (DFL)	$692,476	$690,132	$2,345
Doug Williams (I)	Unreported		

===== Outside Spending =====
Candidate (party)	Supported	Opposed
John Kline (R)	$5,821	$0
Coleen Rowley (DFL)	$43,154	$0
Doug Williams (I)	$0	$0

== District 3 ==
2006 Minnesota's 3rd congressional district election
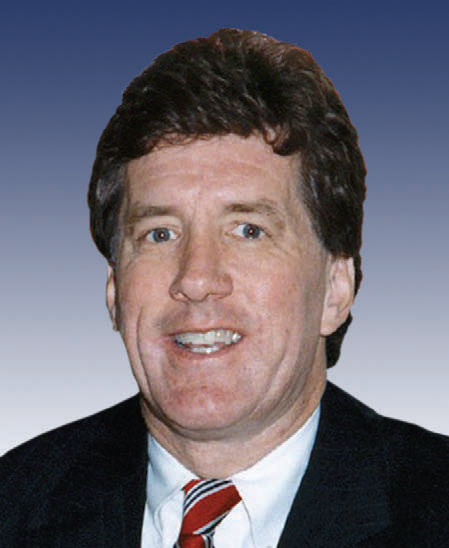

Nominee	Jim Ramstad	Wendy Wilde
Party	Republican	Democratic (DFL)
Popular vote	184,333	99,588
Percentage	64.9%	35.0%
- Precinct results Ramstad: 50–60% 60–70% 70–80% 80–90% Wilde: 50–60% 60–70% Tie: 40–50%
U.S. Representative before election
Jim Ramstad
Republican
Elected U.S. Representative
Jim Ramstad
Republican

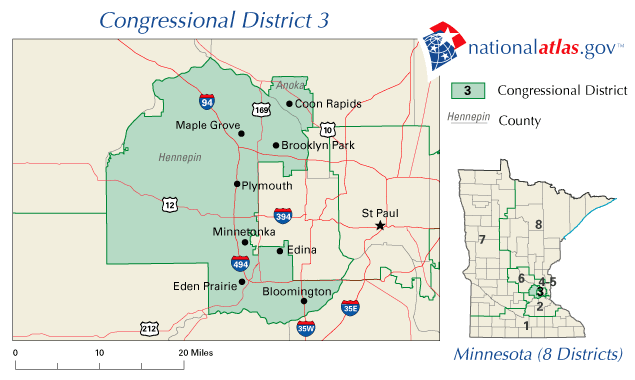

This conservative district encompassed the northern, western, and southern suburbs of Minneapolis and St. Paul in Hennepin County and Anoka County. Incumbent Republican Jim Ramstad, who had represented the district since 1991, ran for re-election. He was re-elected with 64.6% of the vote in 2004 and the district had a PVI of Even.

=== Republican primary ===
==== Candidates ====
===== Nominee =====
- Jim Ramstad, incumbent U.S. Representative

==== Results ====
Republican Primary Election
Party	Candidate	Votes	%
Republican	Jim Ramstad (Incumbent)	17,579	100.0
Total votes		17,579	100.0

=== Democratic primary ===
==== Candidates ====
===== Nominee =====
- Wendy Wilde, broadcaster, news anchor and talk show host

===== Eliminated in primary =====
- Kevin Ray Smith, neuromuscular massage therapist
- Gavin Sullivan, services coordinator

==== Results ====
Democratic Primary Election
Party	Candidate	Votes	%
Democratic (DFL)	Wendy Wilde	19,259	76.8
Democratic (DFL)	Kevin Ray Smith	2,911	11.6
Democratic (DFL)	Gavin Sullivan	2,894	11.6
Total votes		25,064	100.0

=== General election ===
==== Endorsements ====
Jim Ramstad (R)

Newspapers and publications

- Esquire
Wendy Wilde (D)

Labor unions

- AFL-CIO

==== Predictions ====
Source	Ranking	As of
The Cook Political Report	Safe R	November 6, 2006
Rothenberg	Safe R	November 6, 2006
Sabato's Crystal Ball	Safe R	November 6, 2006
Real Clear Politics	Safe R	November 7, 2006
CQ Politics	Safe R	November 7, 2006

==== Results ====
Minnesota's 3rd Congressional district election, 2006
Party	Candidate	Votes	%
Republican	Jim Ramstad (Incumbent)	184,333	64.9
Democratic (DFL)	Wendy Wilde	99,588	35.0
Write-in		323	0.1
Total votes		284,244	100.0
Republican hold			

==== Finances ====
===== Campaigns =====
Candidate (party)	Raised	Spent	Cash on hand
Jim Ramstad (R)	$1,028,886	$1,424,365	$586,456
Wendy Wilde (D)	$67,887	$67,861	$24

===== Outside Spending =====
Candidate (party)	Supported	Opposed
Jim Ramstad (R)	$5,638	$0
Wendy Wilde (D)	$1,060	$0

== District 4 ==
2006 Minnesota's 4th congressional district election
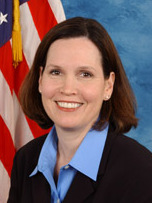

Nominee	Betty McCollum	Obi Sium
Party	Democratic (DFL)	Republican
Popular vote	172,096	74,797
Percentage	69.5%	30.2%
- Precinct results McCollum: 50–60% 60–70% 70–80% 80–90% >90% Sium: 50–60%
U.S. Representative before election
Betty McCollum
Democratic (DFL)
Elected U.S. Representative
Betty McCollum
Democratic (DFL)

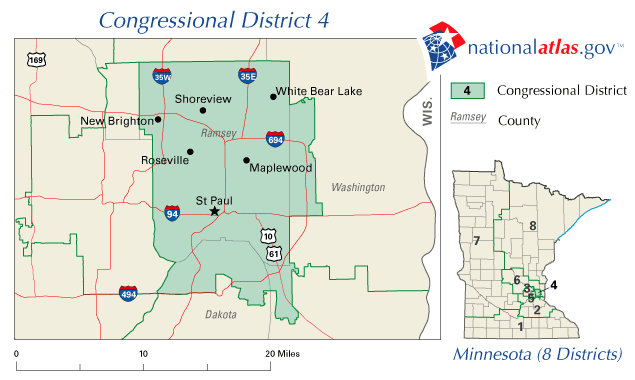

This district covers most of Ramsey County including all of Saint Paul and several Saint Paul suburbs. Incumbent Democrat Betty McCollum, who had represented the district since 2001, ran for re-election. She was re-elected with 57.5% of the vote in 2004 and the district had a PVI of D+13.

=== Democratic primary ===
==== Candidates ====
===== Nominee =====
- Betty McCollum, incumbent U.S. Representative

==== Results ====
Democratic Primary Election
Party	Candidate	Votes	%
Democratic (DFL)	Betty McCollum (Incumbent)	37,397	100.0
Total votes		37,397	100.0

=== Republican primary ===
==== Candidates ====
===== Nominee =====
- Obi Sium, Minnesota Department of Natural Resources employee

===== Eliminated in primary =====
- Jack Shepard, fugitive, alleged arsonist, and former Minneapolis dentist who fled the country after allegedly attempting to burn down his own dental office

==== Results ====
Republican Primary Election
Party	Candidate	Votes	%
Republican	Obi Sium	8,802	64.2
Republican	Jack Shepard	4,908	35.8
Total votes		13,710	100.0

=== General election ===
==== Endorsements ====
Betty McCollum (D)

Labor unions

- AFL-CIO

Newspapers and publications

- Esquire

==== Predictions ====
Source	Ranking	As of
The Cook Political Report	Safe D	November 6, 2006
Rothenberg	Safe D	November 6, 2006
Sabato's Crystal Ball	Safe D	November 6, 2006
Real Clear Politics	Safe D	November 7, 2006
CQ Politics	Safe D	November 7, 2006

==== Results ====
Minnesota's 4th Congressional district election, 2006
Party	Candidate	Votes	%
Democratic (DFL)	Betty McCollum (Incumbent)	172,096	69.5
Republican	Obi Sium	74,797	30.2
Write-in		573	0.2
Total votes		247,466	100.0
Democratic (DFL) hold			

==== Finances ====
===== Campaigns =====
Candidate (party)	Raised	Spent	Cash on hand
Betty McCollum (DFL)	$562,752	$611,908	$74,911
Obi Sium (R)	$79,223	$75,617	$3,603

===== Outside Spending =====
Candidate (party)	Supported	Opposed
Betty McCollum (DFL)	$2,308	$0
Obi Sium (R)	$77	$0

== District 5 ==
2006 Minnesota's 5th congressional district election
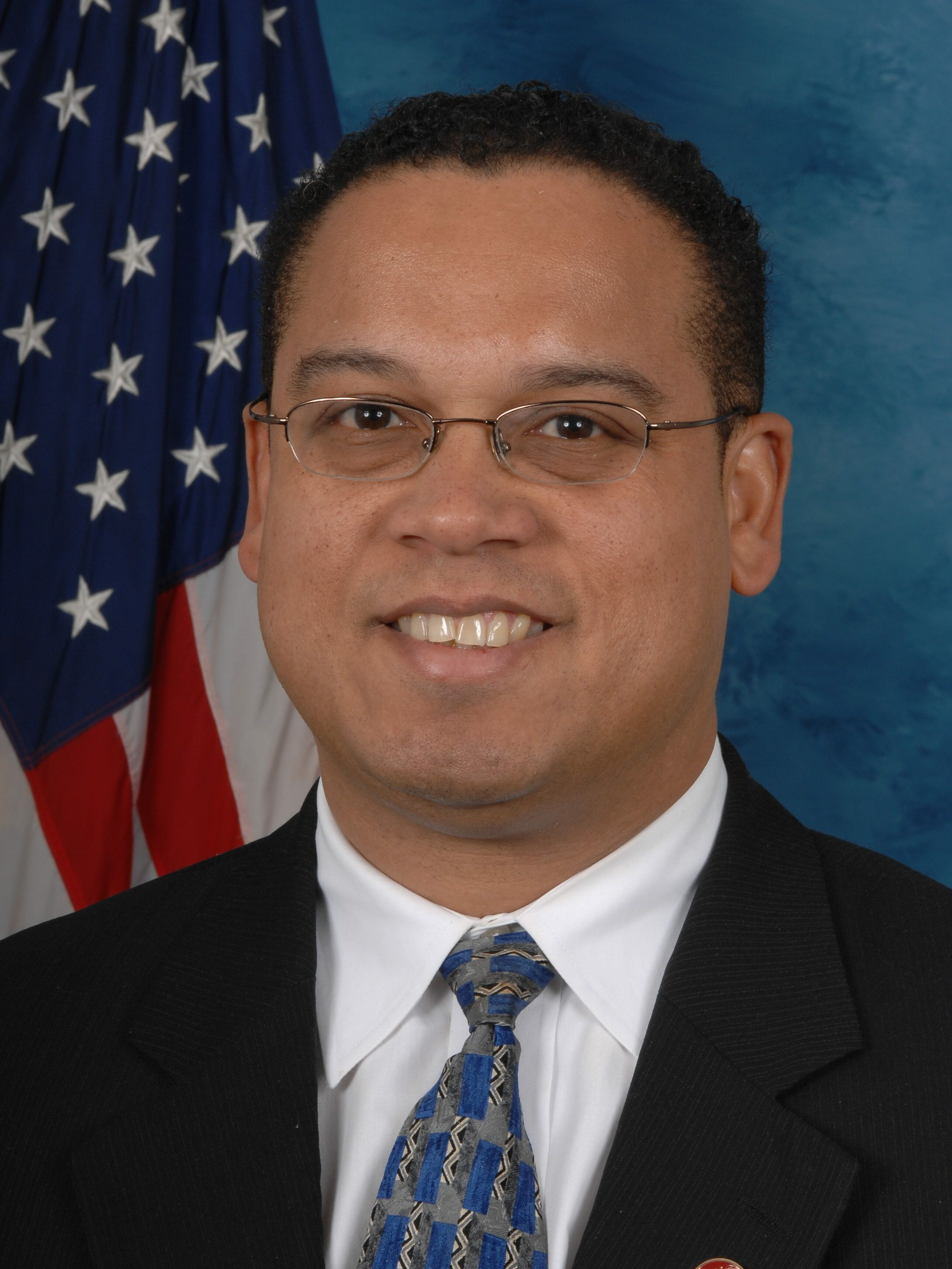

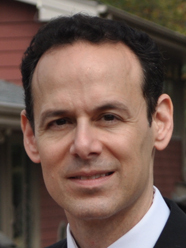

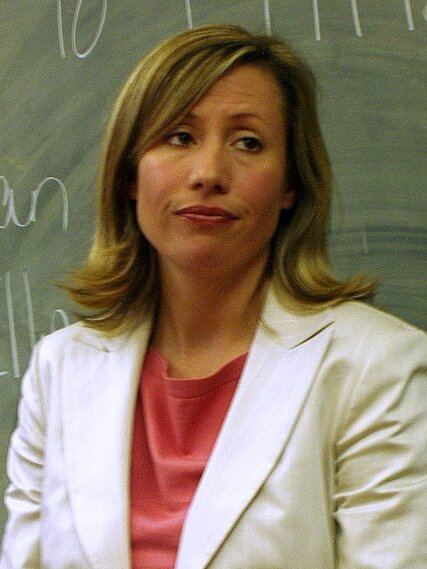
Nominee	Keith Ellison	Alan Fine	Tammy Lee
Party	Democratic (DFL)	Republican	Independence
Popular vote	136,060	52,263	51,456
Percentage	55.6%	21.3%	21.0%
- Precinct results Ellison: 30–40% 40–50% 50–60% 60–70% 70–80% 80–90% >90% Fine: 30–40% 40–50% Lee: 30–40%
U.S. Representative before election
Martin Olav Sabo
Democratic (DFL)
Elected U.S. Representative
Keith Ellison
Democratic (DFL)

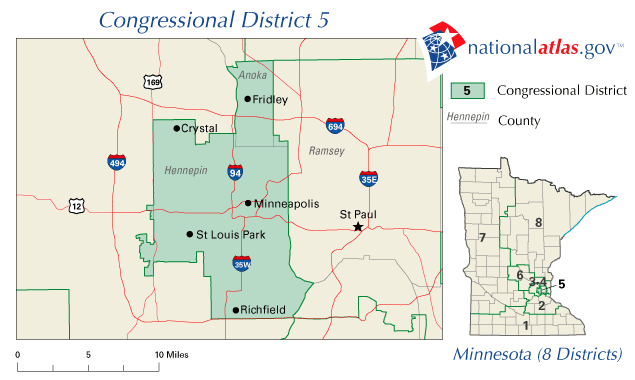

This district covers eastern Hennepin County, including the entire city of Minneapolis, Minnesota, along with parts of Anoka and Ramsey counties. Incumbent Democrat Martin Olav Sabo, who had represented the district since 1979, decided to retire, creating an open seat. He was re-elected with 69.7% of the vote in 2004 and the district had a PVI of D+21.

=== Democratic primary ===
==== Candidates ====
===== Nominee =====
- Keith Ellison, state representative from district 58B since 2003

===== Eliminated in primary =====
- Mike Erlandson, former chairman of the Minnesota Democratic-Farmer-Labor Party; former Chief of Staff to Martin Olav Sabo
- Andrew Vincent Favorite, businessman and former U.S. Navy reservist
- Gregg A. Iverson, perennial candidate and U.S. Army veteran
- Ember Reichgott Junge, former state senator from district 46 (1983–2001)
- Paul Ostrow, member of the Minneapolis City Council
- Patrick J. Wiles, former member of the United Auto Workers Local 879 executive board

==== Withdrew before primary ====
- Gail Dorfman, member of the Hennepin County Commission (endorsed Ellison)
- Anne Knapp, former Assistant Commissioner for the Department of Employment Security (endorsed Saavedra)
- Jack Nelson-Pallmeyer, Associate Professor of Justice and Peace Studies at the University of St. Thomas(endorsed Ellison)
- Jon Olson, President of the Minneapolis Parks Board
- Jorge Saavedra, attorney (endorsed Ellison)
- Gary Schiff, member of the Minneapolis City Council
- Erik Thompson, activist (ran in the 7th district)

==== Declined ====
- Mark Andrew, former chairman of the Minnesota Democratic-Farmer-Labor Party
- Sharon Sayles Belton, former mayor of Minneapolis
- Scott Benson, member of the Minneapolis City Council
- Satveer Chaudhary, state senator
- Scott Dibble, state senator (endorsed Dorfman)
- Betty Folliard, former state representative
- Lisa Goodman, member of the Minneapolis City Council
- Margaret Anderson Kelliher, state representative (endorsed Ellison)
- Peter McLaughlin, member of the Hennepin County Commission
- Mike Opat, member of the Hennepin County Commission (endorsed Dorfman, then Erlandson)
- R.T. Rybak, Mayor of Minneapolis
- Martin Olav Sabo, incumbent U.S. Representative
- Julie Sabo, former state senator, daughter of Rep Sabo and nominee for Lieutenant Governor in 2002

==== Results ====
Democratic Primary Election
Party	Candidate	Votes	%
Democratic (DFL)	Keith Ellison	29,003	41.2
Democratic (DFL)	Mike Erlandson	21,857	31.1
Democratic (DFL)	Ember Junge	14,454	20.5
Democratic (DFL)	Paul Ostrow	3,795	5.4
Democratic (DFL)	Andrew Favorite	470	0.7
Democratic (DFL)	Gregg Iverson	448	0.6
Democratic (DFL)	Patrick Wiles	347	0.5
Total votes		70,374	100.0

=== Republican primary ===
==== Candidates ====
===== Nominee =====
- Alan Fine, business consultant and senior lecturer at the Carlson School of Management

==== Withdrawn ====
- Tim Anderson
- James Turnham

==== Results ====
Republican Primary Election
Party	Candidate	Votes	%
Republican	Alan Fine	7,352	100.0
Total votes		7,352	100.0

=== Green primary ===
==== Candidates ====
===== Nominee =====
- Jay Pond, video editing, production business owner and nominee for this seat in 2004

=== Independence primary ===
==== Candidates ====
===== Nominee =====
- Tammy Lee, former press secretary for United States Senator Byron Dorgan of North Dakota and communications director for Skip Humphrey's 1998 gubernatorial campaign

==== Results ====
Independence Primary Election
Party	Candidate	Votes	%
Independence	Tammy Lee	1,086	100.0
Total votes		1,086	100.0

=== General election ===
==== Endorsements ====
Keith Ellison (D)

Labor unions

- AFL-CIO

Newspapers and publications

- Esquire

==== Polling ====
Poll source	Date(s) administered	Sample size	Margin of error	Keith Ellison (D)	Alan Fine (R)	Jay Pond (G)	Tammy Lee (I)	Undecided
SurveyUSA (KSTP-TV)	October 31–November 4, 2006	806 (LV)	±3.5%	49%	24%	2%	22%	3%

==== Predictions ====
Source	Ranking	As of
The Cook Political Report	Safe D	November 6, 2006
Rothenberg	Safe D	November 6, 2006
Sabato's Crystal Ball	Safe D	November 6, 2006
Real Clear Politics	Safe D	November 7, 2006
CQ Politics	Safe D	November 7, 2006

==== Results ====
Despite a surprisingly strong performance by Lee, Ellison emerged victorious, and became the first African-American Congressman from Minnesota and the first Muslim in Congress.

Minnesota's 5th Congressional district election, 2006
Party	Candidate	Votes	%
Democratic (DFL)	Keith Ellison	136,060	55.6
Republican	Alan Fine	52,263	21.3
Independence	Tammy Lee	51,456	21.0
Green	Jay Pond	4,792	2.0
Write-in		334	0.1
Total votes		244,905	100.0
Democratic (DFL) hold			

==== Finances ====
===== Campaigns =====
Candidate (party)	Raised	Spent	Cash on hand
Keith Ellison (DFL)	$795,047	$786,127	$8,920
Alan Fine (R)	$173,319	$173,621	–$248
Jay Pond (G)	$8,311	$8,312	$0
Tammy Lee (I)	$228,938	$226,398	$2,539

===== Outside Spending =====
Candidate (party)	Supported	Opposed
Keith Ellison (DFL)	$49,978	$0
Alan Fine (R)	$0	$0
Jay Pond (G)	$0	$0
Tammy Lee (I)	$450	$0

== District 6 ==
2006 Minnesota's 6th congressional district election
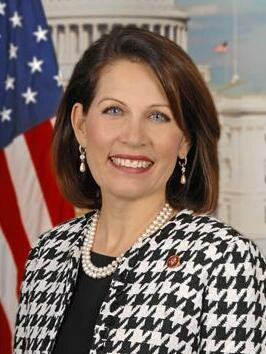

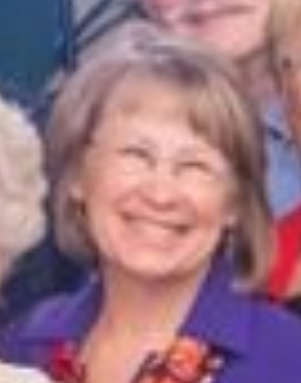

Nominee	Michele Bachmann	Patty Wetterling	John Binkowski
Party	Republican	Democratic (DFL)	Independence
Popular vote	151,248	127,144	23,557
Percentage	50.1%	42.1%	7.8%
- Bachmann: 40–50% 50–60% 60–70% 70–80% >90% Wetterling: 40–50% 50–60% 60–70% Tie: 40–50% No votes
U.S. Representative before election
Mark Kennedy
Republican
Elected U.S. Representative
Michele Bachmann
Republican

This district includes most or all of Benton, Sherburne, Stearns, Wright, Anoka, and Washington counties. Incumbent Republican Mark Kennedy, who had represented the district since 2001, declined to seek a fourth term in Congress, instead opting to run for Senate in the wake of then-Senator Mark Dayton's retirement. Kennedy was re-elected with 54.0% of the vote in 2004 and the district had a PVI of R+5.

=== Republican primary ===
==== Candidates ====
===== Nominee =====
- Michele Bachmann, state senator

===== Withdrawn =====
- Jay Esmay, businessman
- Phil Krinkie, state representative
- Jim Knoblach, state representative
- Cheri Yecke, former Minnesota Commissioner of Education

==== Declined ====
- Michelle Fischbach, state senator
- Rod Grams, former U.S. Senator (ran for U.S. Senate and then ran for 8th district)
- Mark Kennedy, incumbent U.S. Representative (running for U.S. Senate)
- Mary Kiffmeyer, Minnesota Secretary of State
- Dave Kleis, state senator (ran for Mayor of St. Cloud)
- Dan Nygaard, chair of the 6th district Republican Party
- Mark Ourada, state senator

=== Democratic primary ===
Patty Wetterling who had run a competitive race in 2004 initially opted to run the vacant Senate seat before dropping out and switching to running for the 6th again.

==== Candidates ====
===== Nominee =====
- Patty Wetterling, national advocate of children's safety and nominee for this seat in 2004

===== Withdrawn =====
- Scott Mortensen
- Elwyn Tinklenberg, former Mayor of Blaine (endorsed Wetterling)

==== Declined ====
- John Ellenbecke, Mayor of St. Cloud
- Ted Thompson, banker, former chief of staff to Bill Luther and candidate for this seat in 2004

=== Independence primary ===
==== Candidates ====
===== Nominee =====
- John Binkowski, project coordinator for Johnson Controls

=== General election ===
==== Campaign ====
During the campaign, Wetterling attacked Bachmann for voting against increased restrictions on sex offenders, while Bachmann accused Wetterling of wanting to negotiate with terrorists, charges each denied.

==== Endorsements ====
Patty Wetterling (D)

Labor unions

- AFL-CIO

Organizations

- Democratic Congressional Campaign Committee "Red to Blue" Program

Newspapers and publications

- Esquire

==== Polling ====
Poll source	Date(s) administered	Sample size	Margin of error	Michele Bachmann(R)	Patty Wetterling (D)	John Binkowski (I)	Undecided
SurveyUSA (KSTP-TV)	November 1–3, 2006	698 (LV)	±3.8%	49%	42%	7%	2%
Zogby (Reuters)	October 24–29, 2006	500 (LV)	±4.5%	52%	42%	6%	
RT Strategies and Constituent Dynamics	October 24–26, 2006	1,056 (LV)	±3.0%	48%	47%	3%	2%
SurveyUSA (KSTP-TV)	October 22–24, 2006	738 (LV)	±3.7%	49%	43%	5%	3%
RT Strategies and Constituent Dynamics	October 6–12, 2006	995 (LV)	±3.1%	45%	50%	5%	
Information Specialists Group (Star Tribune)	October 6–10, 2006	506 (LV)	±4.4%	40%	48%	4%	8%
SurveyUSA (KSTP-TV)	October 6–8, 2006	669 (LV)	±3.9%	47%	44%	7%	2%
Zogby (Reuters)	September 25–October 2, 2006	500 (LV)	±4.5%	46%	43%	11%	
Feldman Group (D)	September 19–21, 2006	300 (LV)	±5.7%	44%	41%	15%	
SurveyUSA (KSTP-TV)	September 15–17, 2006	641 (LV)	±3.9%	50%	41%	5%	3%
Mellman Group (D-Wetterling)	January 14–16, 2006	400 (LV)	±4.9%	38%	43%	–	19%

==== Predictions ====
Source	Ranking	As of
The Cook Political Report	Tossup	November 6, 2006
Rothenberg	Tossup	November 6, 2006
Sabato's Crystal Ball	Tilt R	November 6, 2006
Real Clear Politics	Lean R	November 7, 2006
CQ Politics	Tossup	November 7, 2006

==== Results ====
Despite polling that indicated that the race would be close, and although this was the most expensive House race in Minnesota, Bachmann defeated Wetterling by a large margin, with Binkowski receiving about 8%.

Minnesota's 6th Congressional district election, 2006
Party	Candidate	Votes	%
Republican	Michele Bachmann	151,248	50.1
Democratic (DFL)	Patty Wetterling	127,144	42.1
Independence	John Binkowski	23,557	7.8
Write-in		239	0.1
Total votes		302,188	100.0
Republican hold			

==== Finances ====
===== Campaigns =====
Candidate (party)	Raised	Spent	Cash on hand
Michele Bachmann (R)	$2,626,866	$2,553,746	$73,120
Patty Wetterling (D)	$4,247,883	$4,273,801	$11,127
John Binkowski (I)	$18,096	$17,060	$1,034

===== Outside Spending =====
Candidate (party)	Supported	Opposed
Michele Bachmann (R)	$243,619	$1,291,566
Patty Wetterling (DFL)	$574,773	$2,502,415
John Binkowski (I)	$0	$0

== District 7 ==
2006 Minnesota's 7th congressional district election
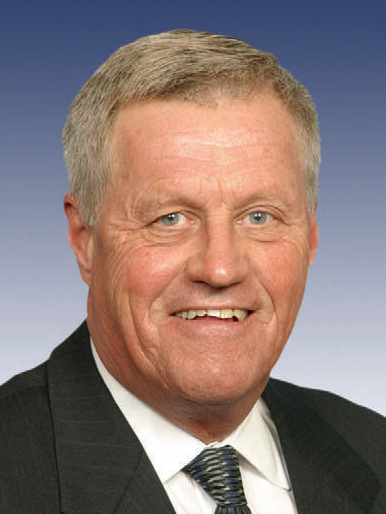

Nominee	Collin Peterson	Michael J. Barrett
Party	Democratic (DFL)	Republican
Popular vote	179,164	74,557
Percentage	69.7%	29.0%
- Peterson: 40–50% 50–60% 60–70% 70–80% 80–90% >90% Barrett: 40–50% 50–60% 60–70% 70–80% >90% Tie: 40–50% No votes
U.S. Representative before election
Collin Peterson
Democratic (DFL)
Elected U.S. Representative
Collin Peterson
Democratic (DFL)

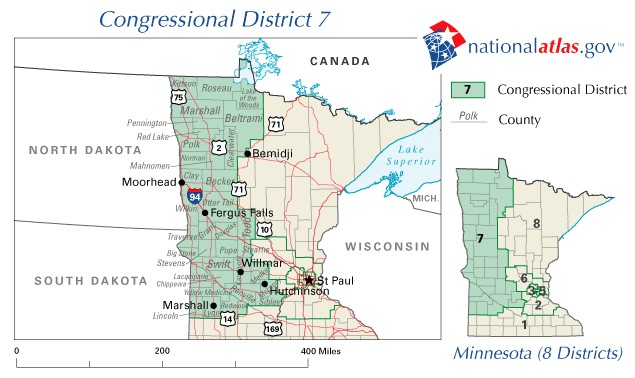

Incumbent Democrat Collin Peterson, who had represented the district since 1991, ran for re-election. He was re-elected with 66.1% of the vote in 2004 and the district had a PVI of R+6. This conservative, rural district based in western Minnesota tended to vote for Republicans at the national level, however Peterson had been able to hold on to his seat with ease since his first election in 1990.

=== Democratic primary ===
==== Candidates ====
===== Nominee =====
- Collin Peterson, incumbent U.S. Representative

===== Eliminated in primary =====
- Erik Thompson, banker

==== Results ====
Democratic Primary Election
Party	Candidate	Votes	%
Democratic (DFL)	Collin Peterson	33,732	86.0
Democratic (DFL)	Erik Thompson	5,476	14.0
Total votes		39,208	100.0

=== Republican primary ===
==== Candidates ====
===== Nominee =====
- Michael Barrett, pharmacist

==== Results ====
Republican Primary Election
Party	Candidate	Votes	%
Republican	Michael Barrett	20,475	100.0
Total votes		20,475	100.0

=== Constitution primary ===
==== Candidates ====
===== Nominee =====
- Ken Lucier, retired U.S. Postal Service employee

=== General election ===
==== Endorsements ====
Collin Peterson (D)

Labor unions

- AFL-CIO

Newspapers and publications

- Esquire

==== Predictions ====
Source	Ranking	As of
The Cook Political Report	Safe D	November 6, 2006
Rothenberg	Safe D	November 6, 2006
Sabato's Crystal Ball	Safe D	November 6, 2006
Real Clear Politics	Safe D	November 7, 2006
CQ Politics	Safe D	November 7, 2006

==== Results ====
Minnesota's 7th Congressional district election, 2006
Party	Candidate	Votes	%
Democratic (DFL)	Collin Peterson (Incumbent)	179,164	69.7
Republican	Michael Barrett	74,557	29.0
Constitution	Ken Lucier	3,303	1.3
Write-in		170	0.1
Total votes		257,194	100.0
Democratic (DFL) hold			

==== Finances ====
===== Campaigns =====
Candidate (party)	Raised	Spent	Cash on hand
Collin Peterson (DFL)	$938,128	$645,285	$315,541
Michael Barrett (R)	$41,378	$41,375	$0
Ken Lucier (C)	Unreported		

===== Outside Spending =====
Candidate (party)	Supported	Opposed
Collin Peterson (DFL)	$6,812	$0
Michael Barrett (R)	$12,428	$0
Ken Lucier (C)	$0	$0

== District 8 ==
2006 Minnesota's 8th congressional district election
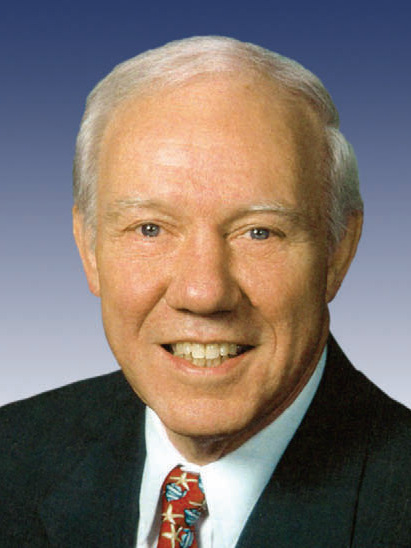

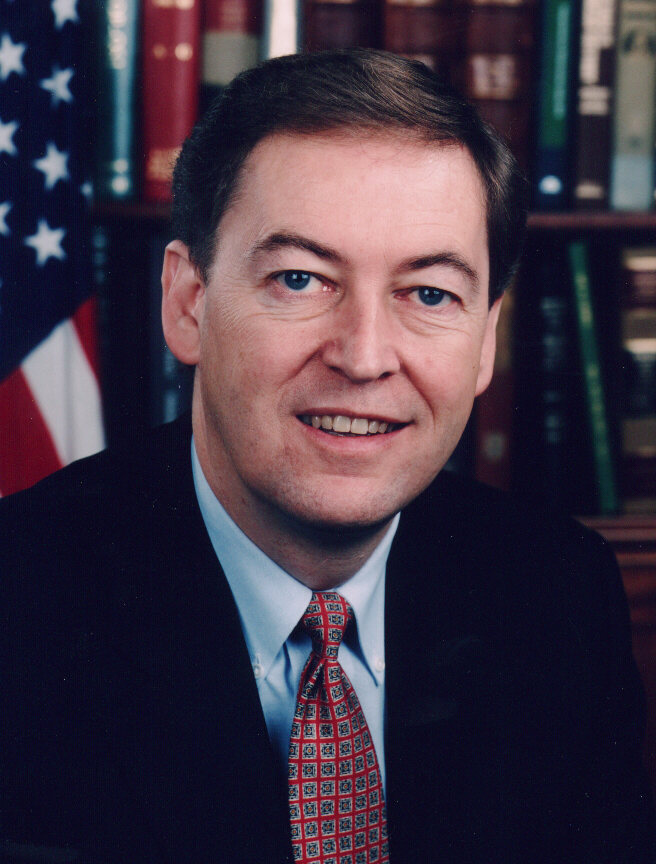
Nominee	Jim Oberstar	Rod Grams
Party	Democratic (DFL)	Republican
Popular vote	180,670	97,683
Percentage	63.6%	34.4%
- Oberstar: 40–50% 50–60% 60–70% 70–80% 80–90% >90% Grams: 40–50% 50–60% 60–70% 70–80% 80–90% Tie: 40–50% 50% No votes
U.S. Representative before election
Jim Oberstar
Democratic (DFL)
Elected U.S. Representative
Jim Oberstar
Democratic (DFL)

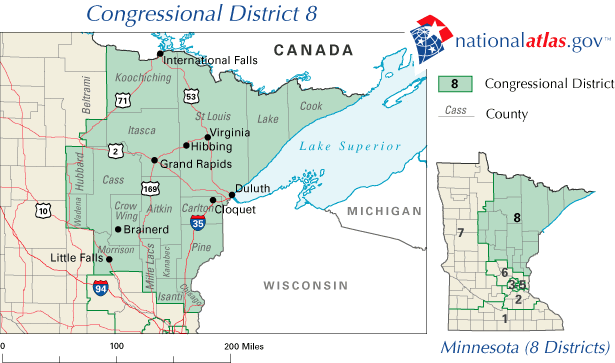

This district covers the northeastern part of Minnesota and includes Duluth, Hibbing, and the Mesabi Range. Incumbent Democrat Jim Oberstar, who had represented the district since 1975, ran for re-election. He was re-elected with 65.2% of the vote in 2004 and the district had a PVI of D+4.

=== Democratic primary ===
==== Candidates ====
===== Nominee =====
- Jim Oberstar, incumbent U.S. Representative

=== Republican primary ===
==== Candidates ====
===== Nominee =====
- Rod Grams, former U.S. Senator

=== Other Candidates ===
- Harry Welty (Unity), Duluth School Board member and perennial candidate

=== General election ===
==== Campaign ====
Oberstar sought a 17th term and faced former United States Senator Rod Grams, who lived outside the district and had represented the 6th district in Congress twelve years earlier.

==== Endorsements ====
Jim Oberstar (D)

Labor unions

- AFL-CIO

Newspapers and publications

- Esquire

==== Predictions ====
Source	Ranking	As of
The Cook Political Report	Safe D	November 6, 2006
Rothenberg	Safe D	November 6, 2006
Sabato's Crystal Ball	Safe D	November 6, 2006
Real Clear Politics	Safe D	November 7, 2006
CQ Politics	Safe D	November 7, 2006

==== Results ====
Despite Grams's high stature and name recognition, he posed no serious threat to Oberstar, who was re-elected in a landslide.

Minnesota's 8th Congressional district election, 2006
Party	Candidate	Votes	%
Democratic (DFL)	Jim Oberstar (incumbent)	180,670	63.6
Republican	Rod Grams	97,683	34.4
Unity	Harry Welty	5,508	1.9
Write-in		155	0.1
Total votes		284,016	100.0
Democratic (DFL) hold			

==== Finances ====
===== Campaigns =====
Candidate (party)	Raised	Spent	Cash on hand
Jim Oberstar (DFL)	$1,368,865	$1,422,123	$172,051
Rod Grams (R)	$489,575	$562,956	$438
Harry Welty (U)	$5,677	$5,398	$278

===== Outside Spending =====
Candidate (party)	Supported	Opposed
Jim Oberstar (DFL)	$22,949	$0
Rod Grams (R)	$0	$0
Harry Welty (U)	$0	$0
