= 2006 Minnesota's 6th congressional district election =

- November 7, 2006
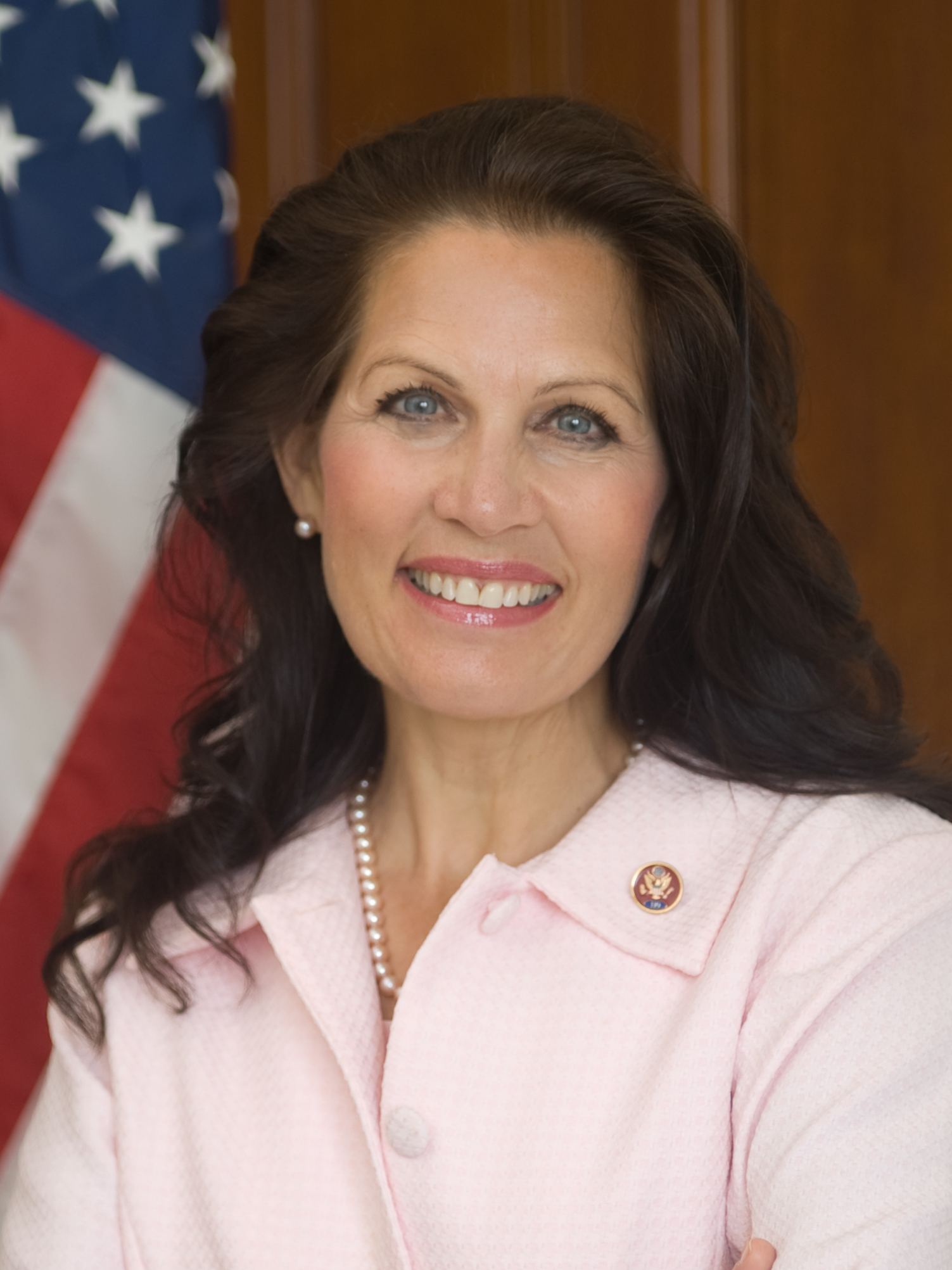

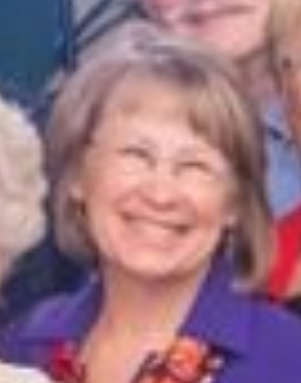

Nominee	Michele Bachmann	Patty Wetterling	John Binkowski
Party	Republican	Democratic	Independence
Popular vote	151,248	127,144	23,557
Percentage	50.1%	42.1%	7.8%
U.S. Representative before election
Mark Kennedy
Republican
Elected U.S. Representative
Michele Bachmann
Republican

The 2006 Minnesota's 6th congressional district election was an election for the United States House of Representatives. State senator Michele Bachmann of the Republican Party defeated child safety advocate Patty Wetterling of the Democratic-Farmer-Labor Party, and project co-ordinator John Binkowski of the Independence Party.

== Republican convention ==
=== Received nomination ===
- Michele Bachmann, state senator

=== Withdrew ===
- Jay Esmay, businessman
- Jim Knoblach, state representative
- Phil Krinkie, state representative
- Cheri Yecke, former Minnesota Commissioner of Education

=== Campaign ===
During the Republican convention, Bachmann and Krinkie both portrayed themselves as conservatives, while Knoblach emphasised his supposed electability.

== Democratic convention ==
=== Received nomination ===
- Patty Wetterling, children's safety advocate; mother of Jacob Wetterling

=== Withdrew ===
- Scott Mortensen
- Elwyn Tinklenberg, former Mayor of Blaine (endorsed Wetterling)

== General election ==
=== Candidates ===
- Michele Bachmann (Republican), state senator
- John Binkowski (Independence), project coordinator for Johnson Controls
- Patty Wetterling (Democratic-Farmer-Labor), children's safety advocate; mother of Jacob Wetterling

=== Campaign ===
Wetterling had previously run for the seat in 2004 against Mark Kennedy, and was widely regarded to have had a strong showing that year. Bachmann, who was considered a staunch conservative, had strong support from the conservative wing of the Republican Party. The resignation of Florida Republican Mark Foley after allegations that he sent sexually suggestive messages to underage congressional pages boosted Wetterling's campaign, as it highlighted an issue that she was very visible on. Wetterling also ran numerous ads about the scandal, claiming that the allegations proved that Republicans were not fit to control the house. Bachmann proceeded to accuse Wetterling of politicising child abuse, a claim that was criticised by Clara Jeffery, editor-in-chief of Mother Jones. The race broke Minnesota records for spending on a House of Representatives election, with a total of $4.6 million being spent.

=== Debates ===
2006 Minnesota's 6th congressional district general election debates
No.	Date & time	Host	Moderator	Link	Participants		
Key: P Participant A Absent N Non-invitee							
Key: P Participant A Absent N Non-invitee					Michele Bachmann	Patty Wetterling	John Binkowski
1	September 26, 2006	St. Cloud Chamber of Commerce			P	A	P
2	October 27, 2006	WCCO-TV	Lawrence R. Jacobs		P	P	P
3	November 1, 2006	Minnesota Public Radio	Kerri Miller		P	P	P

=== Endorsements ===
Michele Bachmann (R)

Executive officials

- George W. Bush, 43rd President of the United States
- Dick Cheney, 46th Vice President of the United States
- Karl Rove, White House Deputy Chief of Staff

State officials

- Jim Knoblach, state representative
- Phil Krinkie, state representative
Patty Wetterling (DFL)

Local officials

- Elwyn Tinklenberg, former Mayor of Blaine

Organizations

- EMILY's List
- League of Conservation Voters
- Service Employees International Union

=== Polling ===
Source	Date	Wetterling (D)	Bachmann (R)	Binkowski (I)
Star Tribune Minnesota Poll	October 21, 2006	48%	40%	4%
Reuters/Zogby	October 4, 2006	43%	46%	
SurveyUSA	September, 2006	41%	50%	5%

=== Predictions ===
Source	Ranking	As of
The Cook Political Report	Tossup	November 6, 2006
Rothenberg	Tossup	November 6, 2006
Sabato's Crystal Ball	Tilt R	November 6, 2006
Real Clear Politics	Lean R	November 7, 2006
CQ Politics	Tossup	November 7, 2006

== Results ==
2006 Minnesota's 6th congressional district election
Party	Candidate	Votes	%
Republican	Michele Bachmann	151,248	50.05
Democratic (DFL)	Patty Wetterling	127,144	42.07
Independence	John Binkowski	23,557	7.80
Independent	Write-ins	239	0.08
Total votes		302,188	100.00

=== By county ===
County	Michelle Bachmann Republican		Patty Wetterling DFL		John Binkowski Independence		Various candidates Other parties		Margin		Total
County	#	%	#	%	#	%	#	%	#	%	Total
Anoka (part)	43,865	49.5%	37,750	42.6%	6,873	7.8%	71	0.1%	6,115	6.9%	88,559
Benton	7,152	50.4%	5,710	40.2%	1,324	9.3%	5	0.1%	1,442	10.2%	14,191
Hennepin (part)	216	54.3%	154	38.7%	28	7.0%	0	0.0%	62	15.6%	398
Sherburne	17,104	53.8%	12,269	38.6%	2,393	7.5%	25	0.1%	4,835	17.2%	31,791
Stearns (part)	25,596	49.7%	21,650	42.0%	4,191	8.1%	51	0.1%	3,946	7.7%	51,488
Washington (part)	31,649	46.2%	31,553	46.1%	5,247	7.7%	53	0.1%	96	0.1%	68,502
Wright	25,664	54.4%	18,059	38.3%	3,400	7.2%	34	0.1%	7,605	16.1%	47,157
Totals	151,246	50.1%	127,145	42.1%	23,456	7.8%	239	0.1%	24,101	8.0%	302,086
