= 2004 United States House of Representatives elections in Minnesota =

- November 2, 2004

All 8 Minnesota seats to the United States House of Representatives
	Majority party	Minority party
Party	Democratic (DFL)	Republican
Last election	4 seats, 49.87%	4 seats, 46.76%
Seats before	4	4
Seats won	4	4
Seat change	Steady	Steady
Popular vote	1,399,624	1,236,094
Percentage	51.42%	45.42%
Swing	▲1.55%	▼1.34%

Democratic–Farmer–Labor
40–50%
50–60%
60–70%
70–80%
80–90%
Republican
40–50%
50–60%
60–70%

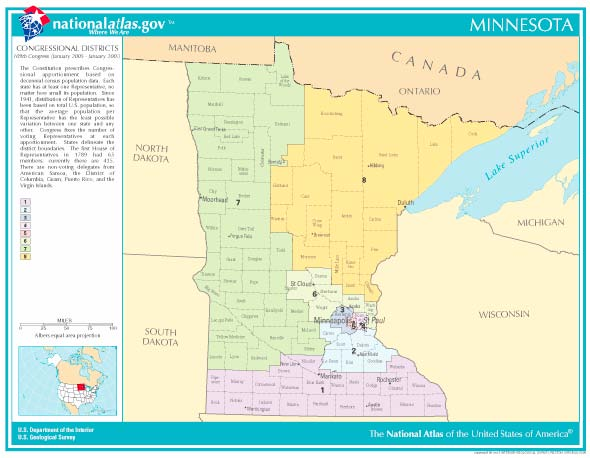
Map of Minnesota showing all eight districts

The 2004 congressional elections in Minnesota were held on November 2, 2004, to determine who would represent the state of Minnesota in the United States House of Representatives.

Minnesota had eight seats in the House, apportioned according to the 2000 United States census. Representatives are elected for two-year terms; those elected served in the 109th Congress from January 3, 2005, until January 3, 2007. The election coincided with the 2004 presidential election. All of the incumbents who represented Minnesota in the United States House of Representative in the 108th Congress were re-elected to the 109th Congress.

== Overview ==
=== Statewide ===
Party	Candidates	Votes		Seats		
Party	Candidates	No.	%	No.	+/–	%
Democratic-Farmer-Labor	8	1,399,624	51.42	4	Steady	50.00
Republican	8	1,236,094	45.42	4	Steady	50.00
Independence	3	56,490	2.08	0	Steady	0.0
Green	2	26,917	0.99	0	Steady	0.0
Write-in	8	2,556	0.09	0	Steady	0.0
Total	29	2,721,681	100.0	8	Steady	100.0

Popular vote
Democratic	51.42%
Republican	45.42%
Independence	2.08%
Other	1.08%

House seats
Democratic	50.00%
Republican	50.00%

=== By district ===
Results of the 2004 United States House of Representatives elections in Minnesota by district:

District	Democratic		Republican		Others		Total		Result
District	Votes	%	Votes	%	Votes	%	Votes	%	Result
District 1	115,088	35.51%	193,132	59.60%	15,835	4.89%	324,055	100.0%	Republican hold
District 2	147,527	41.11%	206,313	57.49%	283	0.08%	358,892	100.0%	Republican hold
District 3	126,665	35.29%	231,871	64.61%	356	0.10%	358,892	100.0%	Republican hold
District 4	182,387	57.48%	105,467	33.24%	29,445	9.28%	317,299	100.0%	Democratic hold
District 5	218,434	69.67%	76,600	24.43%	18,492	5.90%	313,526	100.0%	Democratic hold
District 6	173,309	45.94%	203,669	53.99%	246	0.07%	377,224	100.0%	Republican hold
District 7	207,628	66.07%	106,349	33.84%	280	0.09%	314,257	100.0%	Democratic hold
District 8	228,586	65.22%	112,693	32.15%	9,204	2.63%	350,483	100.0%	Democratic hold
Total	1,399,624	51.42%	1,236,094	45.42%	85,963	3.16%	2,721,681	100.0%	

== District 1 ==
2004 Minnesota's 1st congressional district election
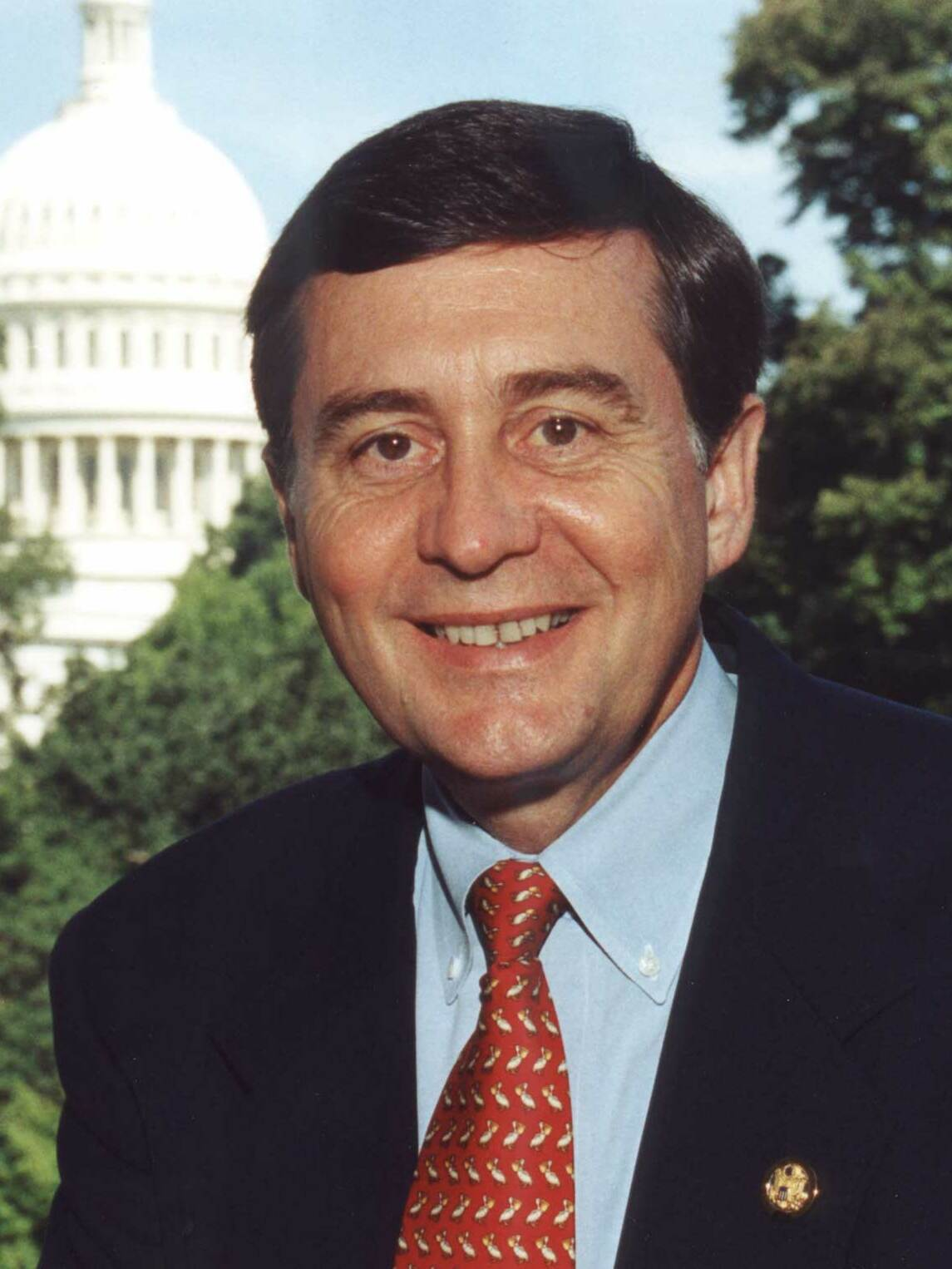

Nominee	Gil Gutknecht	Leigh Pomeroy
Party	Republican	Democratic (DFL)
Popular vote	193,132	115,088
Percentage	59.6%	35.5%
- Precinct results Gutknecht: 40–50% 50–60% 60–70% 70–80% 80–90% >90% Pomeroy: 40–50% 50–60% 60–70% 70–80% >90% Tie: 40–50% 50% No votes
U.S. Representative before election
Gil Gutknecht
Republican
Elected U.S. Representative
Gil Gutknecht
Republican

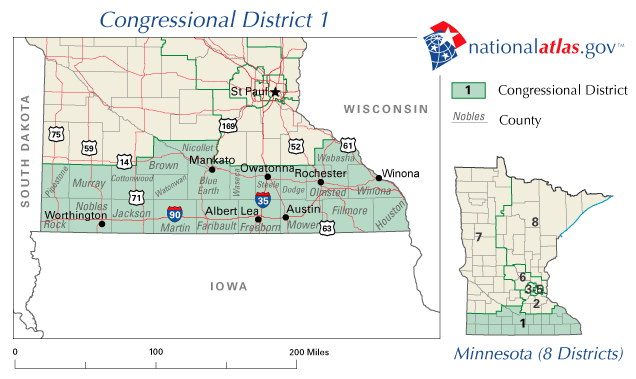

Incumbent Republican Gil Gutknecht, who had represented the district since 1995, ran for re-election. He was re-elected with 61.5% of the vote in 2002.

=== Republican primary ===
==== Candidates ====
===== Nominee =====
- Gil Gutknecht, incumbent U.S. Representative

==== Results ====
Republican Primary Election
Party	Candidate	Votes	%
Republican	Gil Gutknecht (Incumbent)	17,651	100.0
Total votes		17,651	100.0

=== DFL primary ===
==== Candidates ====
===== Nominee =====
- Leigh Pomeroy, university professor and member of the Mankato Planning Commission

===== Withdrawn =====
- Joe Mayer, former Rochester City Council member, former chair of the Olmsted County DFL, retired teacher and football coach at Rochester Lourdes High School (Withdrew June 16, due to health issues)

==== Results ====
Democratic–Farmer–Labor Primary Election
Party	Candidate	Votes	%
Democratic (DFL)	Leigh Pomeroy	12,682	100.0
Total votes		12,682	100.0

=== Independence primary ===
==== Candidates ====
===== Nominee =====
- Gregory Mikkelson, small business owner, farmer and Green nominee for this seat in 2002

===== Eliminated in primary =====
- David Pechulis, Mayor of Preston

==== Results ====
Independence Primary Election
Party	Candidate	Votes	%
Independence	Gregory Mikkelson	765	67.1
Independence	David Pechulis	375	32.9
Total votes		1,140	100.0

=== General election ===
==== Champaign ====
With a large financial advance over his opponent, Gutkencht felt confident enough in his re election not to campaign as heavily as previously.

==== Endorsements ====
Gil Gutknecht (R)

Newspapers

- Albert Lea Tribune

==== Predictions ====
Source	Ranking	As of
The Cook Political Report	Safe R	October 29, 2004
Sabato's Crystal Ball	Safe R	November 1, 2004

==== Results ====
Gutknecht easily won a fifth term, defeating second-place Pomeroy by a comfortable 24 percent margin, as Mikkelson placed at an even more distant third.

Minnesota's 1st Congressional district election, 2004
Party	Candidate	Votes	%
Republican	Gil Gutknecht (Incumbent)	193,132	59.6
Democratic (DFL)	Leigh Pomeroy	115,088	35.5
Independence	Gregory Mikkelson	15,569	4.8
Write-in		266	0.1
Total votes		324,055	100.0
Republican hold			

==== Finances ====
Candidate (party)	Raised	Spent	Cash on hand
Gil Gutknecht (R)	$839,764	$666,410	$360,607
Leigh Pomeroy (DFL)	$59,327	$58,826	$500
Gregory Mikkelson (I)	$7,196	$7,472	$0

== District 2 ==
2004 Minnesota's 2nd congressional district election
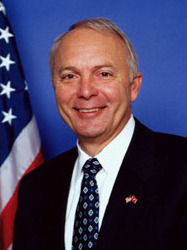

Nominee	John Kline	Teresa Daly
Party	Republican	Democratic (DFL)
Popular vote	206,313	147,527
Percentage	56.4%	40.4%
- Precinct results Kline: 40–50% 50–60% 60–70% 70–80% Daly: 40–50% 50–60% 60–70% 70–80% >90% No votes
U.S. Representative before election
John Kline
Republican
Elected U.S. Representative
John Kline
Republican

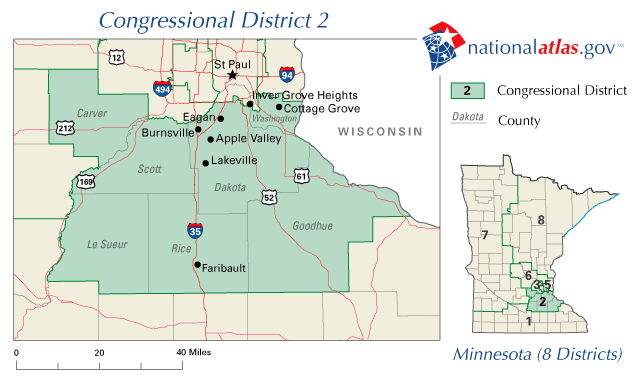

Incumbent Republican John Kline, who had represented the district since 2003, ran for re-election. He was elected with 53.3% of the vote in 2002.

=== Republican primary ===
==== Candidates ====
===== Nominee =====
- John Kline, incumbent U.S. Representative

==== Results ====
Republican Primary Election
Party	Candidate	Votes	%
Republican	John Kline (Incumbent)	12,710	100.0
Total votes		12,710	100.0

=== DFL primary ===
==== Candidates ====
===== Nominee =====
- Teresa Daly, Burnsville City Councillor

==== Results ====
Democratic–Farmer–Labor Primary Election
Party	Candidate	Votes	%
Democratic (DFL)	Teresa Daly	10,206	100.0
Total votes		10,206	100.0

=== Independence primary ===
==== Candidates ====
===== Nominee =====
- Doug Williams, perennial candidate

==== Results ====
Independence Primary Election
Party	Candidate	Votes	%
Independence	Doug Williams	493	100.0
Total votes		493	100.0

=== General election ===
==== Endorsements ====
Teresa Daly (D)

Organizations

- Democratic Congressional Campaign Committee "Red to Blue" Program

==== Debate ====
- Complete video of debate, October 15, 2004

==== Predictions ====
Source	Ranking	As of
The Cook Political Report	Likely R	October 29, 2004
Sabato's Crystal Ball	Safe R	November 1, 2004

==== Results ====
Kline won a second term, defeating Daly by a 16 percent margin, as Williams finished a very distant third.

Minnesota's 2nd Congressional district election, 2004
Party	Candidate	Votes	%
Republican	John Kline (Incumbent)	206,313	56.4
Democratic (DFL)	Teresa Daly	147,527	40.4
Independence	Doug Williams	11,822	3.2
Write-in		283	0.1
Total votes		365,945	100.0
Republican hold			

==== Finances ====
Candidate (party)	Raised	Spent	Cash on hand
John Kline (R)	$1,585,892	$1,600,055	$25,928
Teresa Daly (DFL)	$1,193,784	$1,182,465	$11,318
Doug Williams (I)	Unreported		

== District 3 ==
2004 Minnesota's 3rd congressional district election
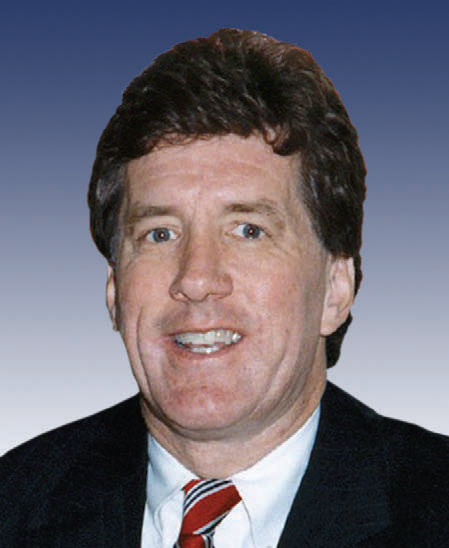

Nominee	Jim Ramstad	Deborah Watts
Party	Republican	Democratic (DFL)
Popular vote	231,871	126,665
Percentage	64.6%	35.3%
- Precinct results Ramstad: 40–50% 50–60% 60–70% 70–80% 80–90% Watts: 50–60% 60–70% No votes
U.S. Representative before election
Jim Ramstad
Republican
Elected U.S. Representative
Jim Ramstad
Republican

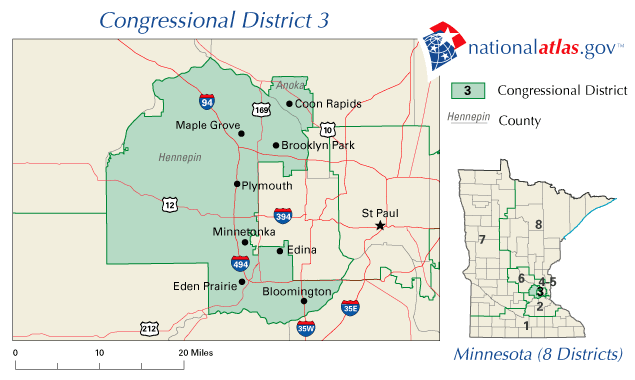

This conservative leaning district encompasses the northern, western, and southern suburbs of Minneapolis and St. Paul in Hennepin County and Anoka County. Incumbent Republican Jim Ramstad, who had represented the district since 1991, ran for re-election. He was re-elected with 72.0% of the vote in 2002

=== Republican primary ===
Ramstad faced a primary challenge from Burton Hanson, but won renomination by a margin of nearly 80 percent in the Republican primary.

==== Candidates ====
===== Nominee =====
- Jim Ramstad, incumbent U.S. Representative

===== Eliminated in primary =====
- Burton Hanson, attorney and nominee for State Supreme Court Chief Justice in 2000

==== Results ====
Republican Primary Election
Party	Candidate	Votes	%
Republican	Jim Ramstad (Incumbent)	19,232	89.9
Republican	Burton Hanson	2,159	10.1
Total votes		21,391	100.0

=== DFL primary ===
==== Candidates ====
===== Nominee =====
- Deborah Watts, marketing and management consultant

==== Results ====
Democratic–Farmer–Labor Primary Election
Party	Candidate	Votes	%
Democratic (DFL)	Deborah Watts	7,438	100.0
Total votes		7,438	100.0

=== General election ===
==== Predictions ====
Source	Ranking	As of
The Cook Political Report	Safe R	October 29, 2004
Sabato's Crystal Ball	Safe R	November 1, 2004

==== Results ====
Ramstad defeated DFL challenger Deborah Watts, easily winning election to his eighth term in Congress.

Minnesota's 3rd Congressional district election, 2004
Party	Candidate	Votes	%
Republican	Jim Ramstad (Incumbent)	231,871	64.6
Democratic (DFL)	Deborah Watts	126,665	35.3
Write-in		356	0.1
Total votes		358,892	100.0
Republican hold			

==== Finances ====
Candidate (party)	Raised	Spent	Cash on hand
Jim Ramstad (R)	$1,011,873	$921,476	$981,936
Deborah Watts (D)	$38,511	$36,064	$2,447

== District 4 ==
2004 Minnesota's 4th congressional district election
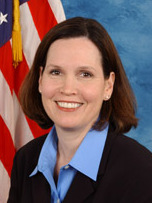

Nominee	Betty McCollum	Patrice Bataglia	Peter F. Vento
Party	Democratic (DFL)	Republican	Independence
Popular vote	182,387	105,467	29,099
Percentage	57.5%	33.2%	9.2%
- Precinct results McCollum: 40–50% 50–60% 60–70% 70–80% 80–90% Bataglia: 40–50% 50–60% 60–70% No votes
U.S. Representative before election
Betty McCollum
Democratic (DFL)
Elected U.S. Representative
Betty McCollum
Democratic (DFL)

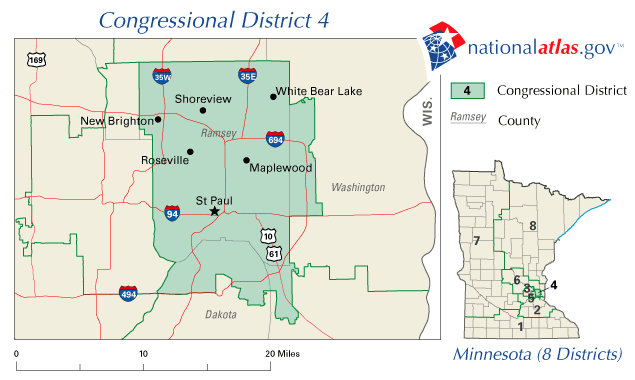

This district covers most of Ramsey County including all of Saint Paul and several Saint Paul suburbs. Incumbent Democrat Betty McCollum, who had represented the district since 2001, ran for re-election. She was re-elected with 62.2% of the vote in 2002.

=== DFL primary ===
==== Candidates ====
===== Nominee =====
- Betty McCollum, incumbent U.S. Representative

==== Results ====
Democratic–Farmer–Labor Primary Election
Party	Candidate	Votes	%
Democratic (DFL)	Betty McCollum (Incumbent)	16,529	100.0
Total votes		16,529	100.0

=== Republican primary ===
==== Candidates ====
===== Nominee =====
- Patrice Bataglia, Dakota County commissioner

===== Eliminated in primary =====
- Jack Shepard, fugitive, alleged arsonist, and former Minneapolis dentist who fled the country after allegedly attempting to burn down his own dental office

==== Results ====
Republican Primary Election
Party	Candidate	Votes	%
Republican	Patrice Bataglia	7,969	76.7
Republican	Jack Shepard	2,417	23.3
Total votes		10,386	100.0

=== Independence primary ===
==== Candidates ====
===== Nominee =====
- Peter Vento, Antique store owner, son of former U.S. Representative Bruce Vento and candidate for this seat in 2002

===== Eliminated in primary =====
- Bob Cardinal, investment broker and Republican nominee for State Senate District 54 in 1990

==== Results ====
Independence Primary Election
Party	Candidate	Votes	%
Independence	Peter Vento	754	60.9
Independence	Bob Cardinal	485	39.1
Total votes		1,239	100.0

=== General election ===
==== Predictions ====
Source	Ranking	As of
The Cook Political Report	Safe D	October 29, 2004
Sabato's Crystal Ball	Safe D	November 1, 2004

==== Results ====
Defeating Bataglia by a comfortable 24 percent margin, McCollum easily won re-election to her third term in Congress, as Vento finished a distant third

Minnesota's 4th Congressional district election, 2004
Party	Candidate	Votes	%
Democratic (DFL)	Betty McCollum (Incumbent)	182,387	57.5
Republican	Patrice Bataglia	105,467	33.2
Independence	Peter F. Vento	29,099	9.2
Write-in		346	0.1
Total votes		317,299	100.0
Democratic (DFL) hold			

==== Finances ====
Candidate (party)	Raised	Spent	Cash on hand
Betty McCollum (DFL)	$687,907	$707,384	$124,068
Patrice Bataglia (R)	$201,403	$194,717	$6,682
Peter Vento (I)	Unreported		

== District 5 ==
2004 Minnesota's 5th congressional district election
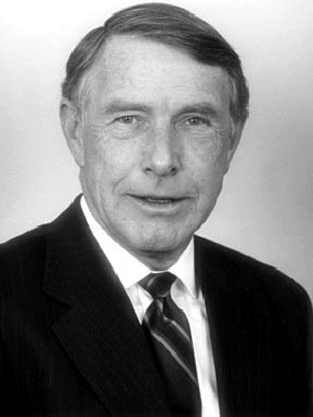

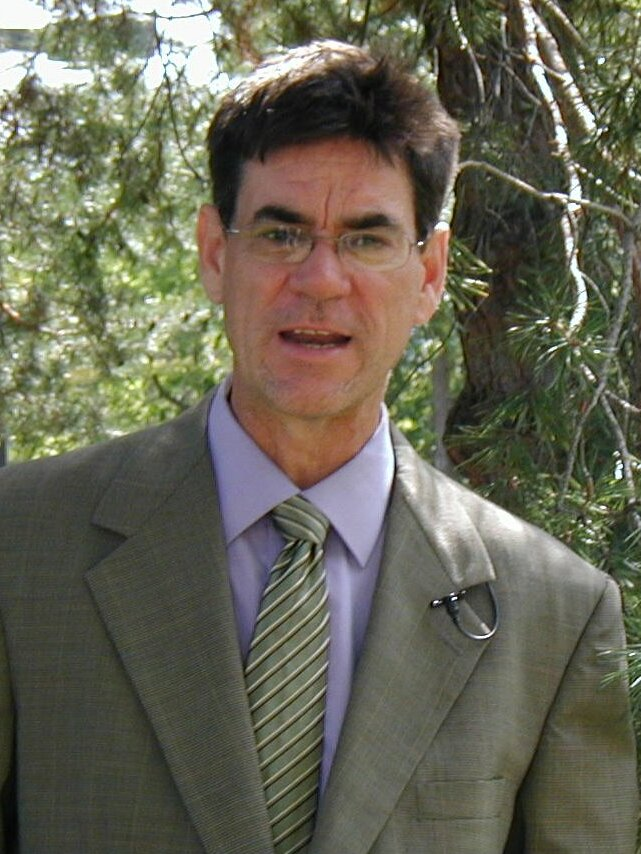
Nominee	Martin Olav Sabo	Daniel Mathias	Jay Pond
Party	Democratic (DFL)	Republican	Green
Popular vote	218,434	76,600	17,984
Percentage	69.7%	24.4%	5.7%
- Precinct results Sabo: 40–50% 50–60% 60–70% 70–80% 80–90% >90% No votes
U.S. Representative before election
Martin Olav Sabo
Democratic (DFL)
Elected U.S. Representative
Martin Olav Sabo
Democratic (DFL)

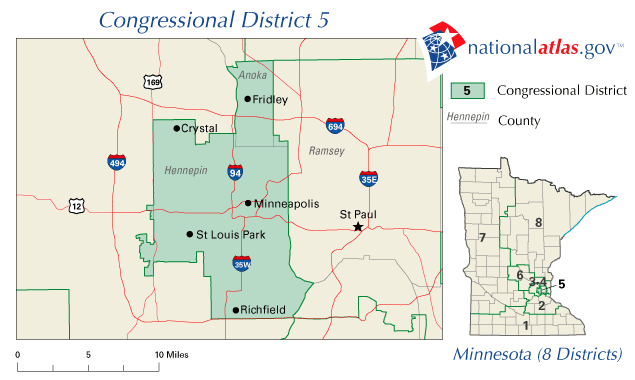

This district covers eastern Hennepin County, including the entire city of Minneapolis, Minnesota, along with parts of Anoka and Ramsey counties. Incumbent Democrat Martin Olav Sabo, who had represented the district since 1979, ran for re-election. He was re-elected with 67.0% of the vote in 2002.

=== DFL primary ===
==== Candidates ====
- Martin Olav Sabo, incumbent U.S. Representative

===== Eliminated in primary =====
- Dick Franson, former Chief Appraiser for the U.S. Department of Veterans Affairs, industrial salesman, perennial candidate

==== Results ====
Democratic–Farmer–Labor Primary Election
Party	Candidate	Votes	%
Democratic (DFL)	Martin Olav Sabo (Incumbent)	23,047	91.1
Democratic (DFL)	Dick Franson	2,264	8.9
Total votes		25,311	100.0

=== Republican primary ===
==== Candidates ====
===== Nominee =====
- Daniel Mathias, courier driver, part time college professor and nominee for this seat in 2002

==== Results ====
Republican Primary Election
Party	Candidate	Votes	%
Republican	Daniel Mathias	5,840	100.0
Total votes		5,840	100.0

=== Green primary ===
==== Candidates ====
===== Nominee =====
- Jay Pond, video editing and production business owner

==== Results ====
Green Primary Election
Party	Candidate	Votes	%
Green	Jay Pond	665	100.0
Total votes		665	100.0

=== General election ===
==== Predictions ====
Source	Ranking	As of
The Cook Political Report	Safe D	October 29, 2004
Sabato's Crystal Ball	Safe D	November 1, 2004

==== Results ====
Sabo had no difficulty winning his 14th term in Congress, defeating Republican challenger Daniel Mathias by a margin of more than 45 percent, while Green candidate Jay Pond finished a distant third.

Minnesota's 5th Congressional district election, 2004
Party	Candidate	Votes	%
Democratic (DFL)	Martin Olav Sabo (Incumbent)	218,434	69.7
Republican	Daniel Mathias	76,600	24.4
Green	Jay Pond	17,984	5.7
Write-in		508	0.2
Total votes		313,526	100.0
Democratic (DFL) hold			

==== Finances ====
Candidate (party)	Raised	Spent	Cash on hand
Martin Olav Sabo (DFL)	$556,935	$497,073	$222,070
Dan Mathias (R)	$13,193	$11,504	$1,708
Jay Pond (G)	Unreported		

== District 6 ==
2004 Minnesota's 6th congressional district election
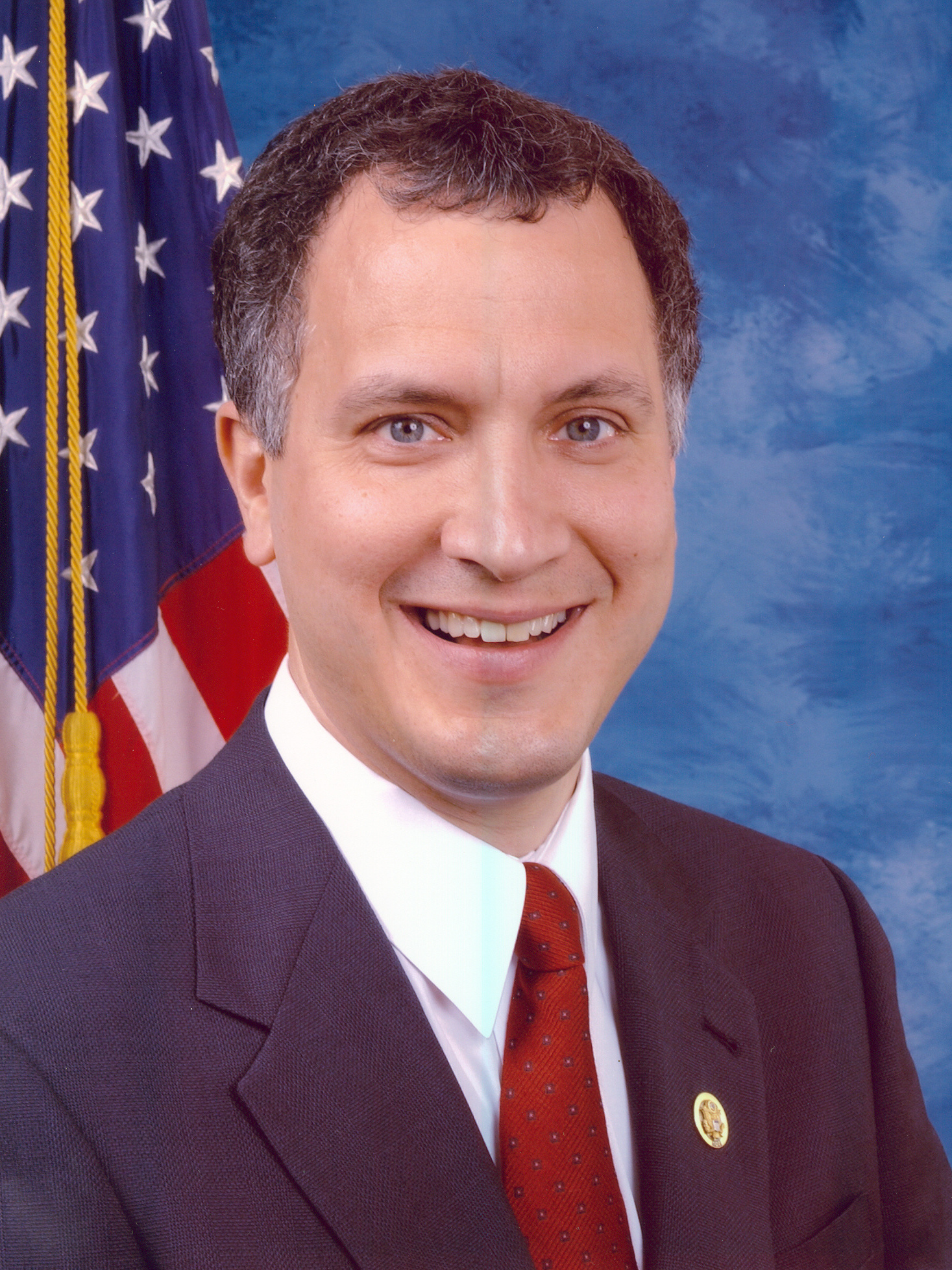

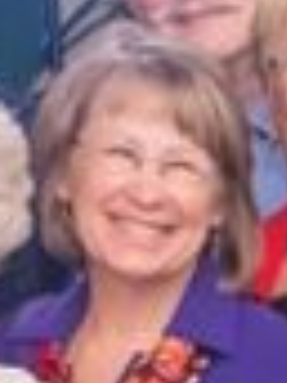
Nominee	Mark Kennedy	Patty Wetterling
Party	Republican	Democratic (DFL)
Popular vote	203,669	173,309
Percentage	54.0%	45.9%
- Precinct results Kennedy: 50–60% 60–70% 70–80% Wetterling: 40–50% 50–60% 60–70% No votes
U.S. Representative before election
Mark Kennedy
Republican
Elected U.S. Representative
Mark Kennedy
Republican

This district includes most or all of Benton, Sherburne, Stearns, Wright, Anoka, and Washington counties. Incumbent Republican Mark Kennedy, who had represented the district since 2001, ran for election. He was re-elected with 57.3% of the vote in 2002.

=== Republican primary ===
==== Candidates ====
===== Nominee =====
- Mark Kennedy, incumbent U.S. Representative

==== Results ====
Republican Primary Election
Party	Candidate	Votes	%
Republican	Mark Kennedy (Incumbent)	11,817	100.0
Total votes		11,817	100.0

=== DFL primary ===
==== Candidates ====
===== Nominee =====
- Patty Wetterling, child safety advocate, and mother of kidnapping and murder victim Jacob Wetterling

===== Withdrawn =====
- Ted Thompson, banker and former chief of staff to Bill Luther

===== Declined =====
- Tarryl Clark, attorney and social justice advocate

==== Results ====
Democratic–Farmer–Labor Primary Election
Party	Candidate	Votes	%
Democratic (DFL)	Patty Wetterling	10,385	100.0
Total votes		10,385	100.0

=== General election ===
==== Endorsements ====
Patty Wetterling (D)

Organizations

- Democratic Congressional Campaign Committee "Red to Blue" Program

==== Polling ====
Poll source	Date(s) administered	Sample size	Margin of error	Mark Kennedy (R)	Patty Wetterling (D)	Undecided
Mason-Dixon Opinion Research (5 Eyewitness News)	October 31, 2004	357	±5.3%	53%	36%	11%
Mason-Dixon Opinion Research (5 Eyewitness News)	October 26, 2004	?	±5.3%	52%	34%	14%

==== Predictions ====
Source	Ranking	As of
The Cook Political Report	Lean R	October 29, 2004
Sabato's Crystal Ball	Safe R	November 1, 2004

==== Results ====
Kennedy encountered little difficulty winning his third term in Congress, defeating his DFL challenger, child safety advocate Patty Wetterling, by a margin of about 8 percent. This was by far the closest congressional election in Minnesota in 2004.

Minnesota's 6th Congressional district election, 2004
Party	Candidate	Votes	%
Republican	Mark Kennedy (Incumbent)	203,669	54.0
Democratic (DFL)	Patty Wetterling	173,309	45.9
Write-in		246	0.1
Total votes		377,224	100.0
Republican hold			

==== Finances ====
Candidate (party)	Raised	Spent	Cash on hand
Mark Kennedy (R)	$2,548,403	$2,381,634	$66,218
Patty Wetterling (D)	$1,972,867	$1,935,813	$37,053

== District 7 ==
2004 Minnesota's 7th congressional district election
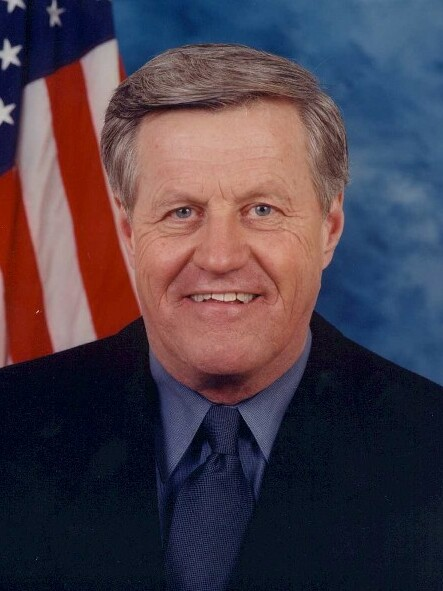

Nominee	Collin Peterson	David Sturrock
Party	Democratic (DFL)	Republican
Popular vote	207,628	106,349
Percentage	66.1%	33.8%
- Precinct results Peterson: 40–50% 50–60% 60–70% 70–80% 80–90% >90% Sturrock: 50–60% 60–70% 70–80% Tie: 50%
U.S. Representative before election
Collin Peterson
Democratic (DFL)
Elected U.S. Representative
Collin Peterson
Democratic (DFL)

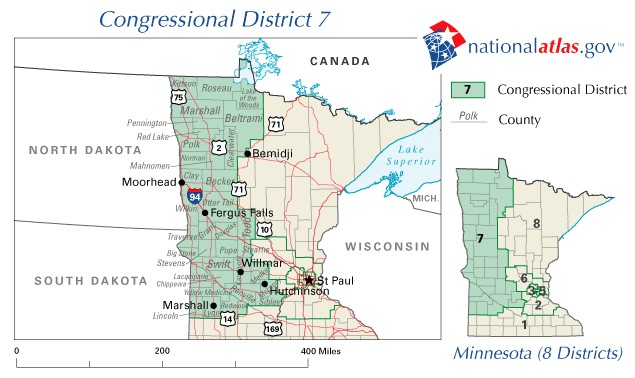

This conservative, rural district is based in western Minnesota. Incumbent Democrat Collin Peterson, who had represented the district since 1991, ran for re-election. He was re-elected with 65.3% of the vote in 2002.

=== DFL primary ===
==== Candidates ====
===== Nominee =====
- Collin Peterson, incumbent U.S. Representative

==== Results ====
Democratic–Farmer–Labor Primary Election
Party	Candidate	Votes	%
Democratic (DFL)	Collin Peterson (Incumbent)	16,036	100.0
Total votes		16,036	100.0

=== Republican primary ===
==== Candidates ====
===== Nominee =====
- David Sturrock, Marshall City Council member and political science professor

==== Results ====
Republican Primary Election
Party	Candidate	Votes	%
Republican	David Sturrock	10,882	100.0
Total votes		10,882	100.0

=== General election ===
==== Predictions ====
Source	Ranking	As of
The Cook Political Report	Safe D	October 29, 2004
Sabato's Crystal Ball	Safe D	November 1, 2004

==== Results ====
Peterson faced no difficulty winning his eighth term in Congress, defeating Republican challenger David Sturrock by a landslide 32 percent margin.

Minnesota's 7th Congressional district election, 2004
Party	Candidate	Votes	%
Democratic (DFL)	Collin Peterson (Incumbent)	207,628	66.1
Republican	David Sturrock	106,349	33.8
Write-in		280	0.1
Total votes		314,257	100.0
Democratic (DFL) hold			

==== Finances ====
Candidate (party)	Raised	Spent	Cash on hand
Collin Peterson (DFL)	$422,906	$524,067	$22,700
David Sturrock (R)	$127,022	$127,271	$0

== District 8 ==
2004 Minnesota's 8th congressional district election
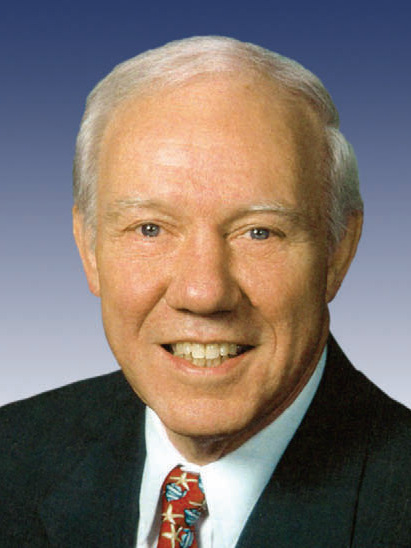

Nominee	Jim Oberstar	Mark Groettum
Party	Democratic (DFL)	Republican
Popular vote	228,586	112,693
Percentage	65.2%	32.2%
- Precinct results Oberstar: 30–40% 40–50% 50–60% 60–70% 70–80% 80–90% >90% Groettum: 30–40% 40–50% 50–60% 60–70% 70–80% Write-Ins: 30–40% Tie: 40–50% 50% No votes
U.S. Representative before election
Jim Oberstar
Democratic (DFL)
Elected U.S. Representative
Jim Oberstar
Democratic (DFL)

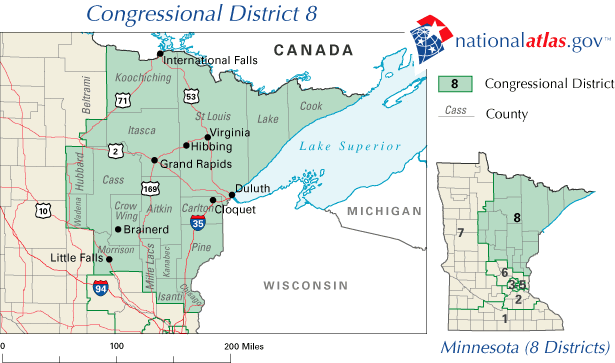

This district covers the northeastern part of Minnesota and includes Duluth, Hibbing, and the Mesabi Range. Incumbent Democrat Jim Oberstar, who had represented the district since 1975, ran for re-election. He was re-elected with 68.6% of the vote in 2002.

=== DFL primary ===
==== Candidates ====
===== Nominee =====
- Jim Oberstar, incumbent U.S. Representative

===== Eliminated in primary =====
- Michael H. Johnson, environmental scientist and commercial pilot

==== Results ====
Democratic–Farmer–Labor Primary Election
Party	Candidate	Votes	%
Democratic (DFL)	James L. Oberstar (Incumbent)	37,353	85.5
Democratic (DFL)	Michael H. Johnson	6,314	14.5
Total votes		43,667	100.0

=== Republican primary ===
==== Candidates ====
===== Nominee =====
- Mark Groettum, attorney and nominee for State House of Representatives, District 5B in 1994 and 1996

==== Results ====
Republican Primary Election
Party	Candidate	Votes	%
Republican	Mark Groettum	13,429	100.0
Total votes		13,429	100.0

=== Green primary ===
==== Candidates ====
===== Nominee =====
- Van Presley, physical therapist

==== Results ====
Green Primary Election
Party	Candidate	Votes	%
Green	Van Presley	516	100.0
Total votes		516	100.0

=== General election ===
==== Predictions ====
Source	Ranking	As of
The Cook Political Report	Safe D	October 29, 2004
Sabato's Crystal Ball	Safe D	November 1, 2004

==== Results ====
Oberstar had no difficulty winning his 16th term in Congress, defeating Republican challenger Mark Groettum by a margin of more than 33 percent, while Green candidate Van Presley finished a very distant third.

Minnesota's 8th Congressional district election, 2004
Party	Candidate	Votes	%
Democratic (DFL)	Jim Oberstar (Incumbent)	228,586	65.2
Republican	Mark Groettum	112,693	32.2
Green	Van Presley	8,933	2.6
Write-in		271	0.1
Total votes		350,483	100.0
Democratic (DFL) hold			

==== Finances ====
Candidate (party)	Raised	Spent	Cash on hand
Jim Oberstar (DFL)	$1,121,919	$972,916	$225,310
Mark Groettum (R)	$42,714	$41,187	$1,526
Van Presley (G)	$6,657	$5,728	$785
