= Elwyn Tinklenberg =

American politician (born 1950)

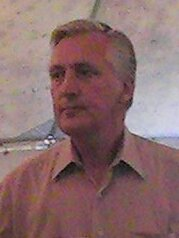
- Tinklenberg at an IBEW local picnic

Mayor of Blaine, Minnesota
- In office 1987–1996
- Succeeded by: Tom Ryan

Personal details
- Born: February 26, 1950 (age 76) Princeton, Minnesota, U.S.
- Party: Democratic-Farmer-Labor
- Spouse: Terri Tinklenberg
- Children: Patrick Tinklenberg, Aaron Tinklenberg, Jessica Tinklenberg, Aaron Richey, Alli Richey, Anna Richey
- Education: University of Minnesota Duluth

Elwyn "El" Tinklenberg (born February 26, 1950) has been an American government official and candidate for public office. He was Commissioner of the Minnesota Department of Transportation, a city council member and mayor, and a two-time candidate for the Democratic-Farmer-Labor Party nomination for U.S. Congress from Minnesota's 6th District.

Tinklenberg was born in Princeton, Minnesota and grew up on a farm in Pease, Minnesota, a small, Dutch farming community in central Minnesota. He earned his undergraduate degree at the University of Minnesota Duluth in 1973. Afterward, he enrolled at Garrett-Evangelical Theological Seminary in Evanston, Illinois. He completed his Master of Divinity at United Theological Seminary of the Twin Cities in 1977. He served as a United Methodist minister in Blaine, Minnesota, from 1977 to 1986 before being elected to the Blaine City Council and then Mayor of Blaine. He was appointed Minnesota Transportation Commissioner in 1998.

== Career ==
=== Blaine mayor ===
In the 1980s, Tinklenberg was elected to the Blaine City Council, and in 1987, he was elected Mayor of Blaine, serving until 1996. Tinklenberg was a crucial player in the construction of the National Sports Center in Blaine, a 600-acre (2.4 km^{2}) multi-sport complex that includes a soccer stadium with a track, over 50 youth soccer fields, a golf course, a meeting and convention facility, and an eight-sheet ice rink, the Schwan Super Rink.

=== Minnesota Transportation Commissioner ===
In 1991, Tinklenberg headed the North Metro Mayors Association, which worked to improve the transportation systems and business opportunities of its member communities. During that time, he gained a reputation as an expert of transportation and infrastructure issues, which led to his appointment as Transportation Commissioner by then Governor Jesse Ventura in 1998. In that role, Tinklenberg worked with Ventura to support aggressive construction and improvement of highways statewide. He worked with the Minnesota State Legislature to create bipartisan support for a regional commuter plan for the Minneapolis-St. Paul area. This plan included the construction of the METRO Blue Line (the state's first light-rail line) and the Northstar commuter rail line.

In 2002, Tinklenberg oversaw the implementation of the Mn/DOT 511 service, an integrated internet and phone system for travel information. The 511 service is used by Minnesota travelers to receive information on conditions and amenities. According to Mn/DOT, it is 10 times faster than its predecessor.

After Tinklenberg announced his plans to leave Mn/DOT in 2002, the Minneapolis Star-Tribune published an editorial praising his record and service. The editorial noted that Tinklenberg told Minnesotans "not necessarily what they wanted to hear but what they needed to hear. His frequent explanations helped lift the interwoven issues of roads, transit, housing and development to the top of the state's agenda."

=== House campaigns ===
Tinklenberg has been a candidate for the Minnesota's 6th congressional district twice: in 2006 he was a candidate, but was not nominated; and in 2008, he was nominated but lost the general election.

==== 2006 campaign ====
Tinklenberg was one of two DFL candidates for the sixth district seat in the U.S. House of Representatives in the 2006 election. A former United Methodist minister and manager of the Divisions of Public Services for Anoka County, he ran on a platform that supported jobs, education, transportation and as a socially conservative Democrat who opposed legalized abortion and supported a Federal Constitutional Amendment to ban gay marriage. He had been selected to receive support from the Democratic Congressional Campaign Committee and had received the early endorsement of several important labor unions.

Tinklenberg's opponent for the DFL nomination was Patty Wetterling. Another candidate, Scott Mortensen, dropped out in March 2006. Tinklenberg originally entered the race only after receiving assurances from Wetterling, the DFL's 2004 candidate, that she would not run. Wetterling changed her mind after struggling to gain momentum in her campaign for the open Minnesota Senate seat and after getting encouraged by constituents who wanted a DFL alternative to Tinklenberg. On May 13, 2006, Tinklenberg dropped out of the race and endorsed Patty Wetterling after losing the DFL endorsement.

Michele Bachmann was the Republican candidate for the Minnesota Sixth District seat, which was vacated by Mark Kennedy so he could run for the U.S. Senate. The Minnesota Sixth District covers the northern suburbs of the Twin Cities and extends northwest across rural areas to include St. Cloud. Bachmann, the Republican nominee, won the election.

==== 2008 campaign ====
On September 28, 2007, Tinklenberg announced his plans to again challenge Bachmann for the seat in 2008, along with two other announced candidates, Bob Olson and Bob Hill. Following Tinklenberg's entrance into the race, Hill dropped out.

Tinklenberg received strong support from unions, receiving endorsements from all of the labor organizations that become involved in the election. Throughout the Senate District conventions in March and April, both Olson and Tinklenberg campaigns claimed having a lead in the delegate count.

Closer to the Sixth District DFL Convention, Olson's critiques of Tinklenberg grew sharper. Tinklenberg was accused of supporting the use of taconite tailings in transportation aggregate. Tinklenberg contended that, indeed, he did support the use of western Iron Range taconite tailings in transportation aggregate through a University of Minnesota Natural Resources Research Institute program, which was backed by the Environmental Protection Agency. The University's research concluded that taconite tailings from the western side of the Iron Range were safe for use in road construction, unlike the by-product from the eastern side of the Range, which had been linked to an increased risk to cancer. Tinklenberg reiterated that he would only support the sustainable use of western Iron Range taconite tailings as long as the research showed it to be a safe practice.

Tinklenberg was also accused by congressional opponents, including Bob Olson of the Democratic-Farmer-Labor party, of not complying with lobbying registration regulations. Through his work as a transportation consultant, Tinklenberg had been hired as an adviser to a number of counties and municipalities. Because his work required him to have contact with state legislators, Tinklenberg was required to register as a lobbyist in the state of Minnesota. On February 27, 2008, Eric Zaetsch, a local liberal blogger, filed a complaint with the Minnesota Campaign Finance Board. The Board found Tinklenberg to be in full compliance with the law.

On April 26, 2008, Tinklenberg received the endorsement of the Democratic-Farmer-Labor Party (Minnesota's Democratic Party), garnering 72% of the delegate support on the first ballot — 12% above the required 60% threshold. Olson immediately withdrew, and Tinklenberg received the unanimous support of the Convention.

On the evening of October 17, 2008, Tinklenberg's opponent, Bachmann, appeared on Hardball with Chris Matthews. She said she was "very concerned that [Obama] may have anti-American views," and called for the news media to "do a penetrating expose" on "the views of the people in Congress and find out, are they pro-America or anti-America?" Tinklenberg's total fundraising before the Bachmann appearance was approximately $1 million, under $720,000 of which was from individuals. Prior to Bachmann's remarks, Democrats had already planned to spend $1,000,000 against the Republican incumbent after Tinklenberg had reached the milestone of raising $1,000,000 on his own. Nevertheless, Bachmann won re-election, by just under 3 percentage points.

==== 2010 campaign ====
Although he had set up a website for a 2010 run for the seat, Tinklenberg announced that he had withdrawn from the race to allow the campaign against Bachmann to be conducted in a unified manner by DFL supporters.
