= Phil Krinkie =

American politician

Philip Krinkie

Member of the Minnesota House of Representatives from the 53A district
- In office 1991–2006

Personal details
- Born: February 3, 1950 (age 76) Maplewood, Minnesota, U.S.
- Party: Republican
- Spouse: Mary Ramsey
- Children: 1
- Education: Coe College
- Occupation: businessman

Philip B. Krinkie (born February 3, 1950) is an American politician from the state of Minnesota. He is a former member of the Minnesota House of Representatives, from 1991 to 2006, and was a candidate for Minnesota's 6th congressional district in the United States House of Representatives in 2014 when it was vacated by Michele Bachmann.

Krinkie is from Shoreview, Minnesota. He owns a heating and air-conditioning business and is a member of the board of trustees for the Minnesota State Colleges and Universities System. He served as the president of the Taxpayers League of Minnesota, until he resigned to run for Congress.

Born in Maplewood, Minnesota, Krinkie went to Minnehaha Academy High School. He then received his bachelor's degree from Coe College in 1975.
