= Patty Wetterling =

American children's rights activist (born 1949)

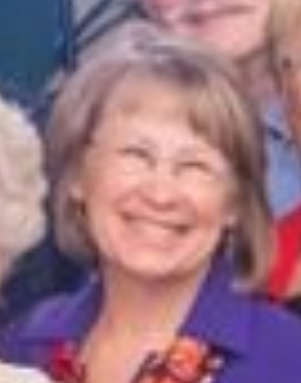
- Wetterling in 2014
- Born: Patricia Lynn King; November 2, 1949 (age 77); Omaha, Nebraska, U.S.
- Education: Minnesota State University, Mankato
- Occupations: Community organizer Political activist
- Years active: 1989–present
- Political party: Minnesota Democratic-Farmer-Labor Party
- Board member of: International Centre for Missing & Exploited Children
- Spouse: Jerry Wetterling
- Children: 4, including Jacob

Patricia Lynn Wetterling (born November 2, 1949) is an American advocate of children's safety and chair of the National Center for Missing and Exploited Children. Her advocacy particularly focuses on protecting children from abduction and abuse. She has become one of the most vocal critics of current sex offender registry laws, painting them as overly broad and unnecessarily causing tremendous harm to many. Her advocacy began after her son Jacob was abducted in 1989 and culminated in passage of the federal Jacob Wetterling Crimes Against Children and Sexually Violent Offender Registration Act. She was a candidate for the Minnesota Sixth District seat in the United States House of Representatives as the Democratic-Farmer-Labor Party candidate in 2004 and 2006, losing to Republicans Mark Kennedy and Michele Bachmann respectively. In September 2016, the remains of her son Jacob were discovered and positively identified.

== Biography ==
Born in Omaha, Nebraska, Wetterling grew up in St. Paul, Minnesota and later moved to St. Joseph, where she raised four children (Amy, Jacob, Trevor and Carmen) with her husband Jerry. On October 22, 1989, their son Jacob, then 11 years old, was abducted at gunpoint by a masked man. An extensive search was carried out, but Jacob and the abductor were not found. Jacob's remains were found on September 1, 2016, 27 years after the abduction. Four months after the abduction, the Wetterlings founded the Jacob Wetterling Foundation, a non-profit organization dedicated to child safety education. Wetterling sent a scathing letter to then Attorney General Alberto Gonzales decrying the dilution of sex offender registration laws and demanding that Congress and the Justice Department fix the flaws that their overzealousness caused. On June 18, 2007, Wetterling was interviewed on air by Minnesota Public Radio and discussed "Romeo and Juliet" offenders (cases where both parties are teenagers and were dating or were willing participants in the sex). Wetterling has found common ground with the National Association of Criminal Defense Lawyers and joined them in declaring the Adam Walsh Act unconstitutional and contrary to public safety. On September 14, 2007, Wetterling reiterated her perception of the harm that current sex offender laws are causing.

== Political career ==
In the 2004 race for U.S. Representative from Minnesota's 6th District she challenged incumbent Republican Mark Kennedy. Wetterling decided to enter the race after Stillwater lawyer Janet Robert withdrew. Wetterling received a $1,000 campaign contribution donation from U.S. Senate candidate Barack Obama, one of only 3 political contributions listed for Obama that year. Kennedy won the election with 54% of the vote to Wetterling's 46%.

Wetterling then entered the race for Mark Dayton's U.S. Senate seat in 2006 when Dayton announced he would not seek reelection. Wetterling withdrew from the race on January 20, 2006, and endorsed Hennepin County Attorney Amy Klobuchar of the Democratic-Farmer-Labor Party, who won the election.

After leaving the Senate race, Wetterling was publicly asked by Attorney General and gubernatorial candidate Mike Hatch to run with him as Lieutenant Governor. Wetterling declined Hatch's offer. On February 3, 2006, Wetterling announced that she would once again run for Congress in Minnesota's Sixth Congressional District. Wetterling's opponent for the DFL nomination was Elwyn Tinklenberg, former mayor of Blaine, Minnesota. A third DFL candidate, Scott Mortensen, dropped out early on.

On May 13, 2006, Wetterling won the DFL endorsement to face Republican state senator Michele Bachmann for the U.S. House seat. Wetterling lost the general election to Bachmann, 50% to 42%.

== Son's abduction ==
In 1999, for the 10th anniversary of Jacob's abduction, Patty Wetterling decided to write an open letter to the abductor. Minnesota newspapers agreed to print it for her. Wetterling consulted the FBI for advice on how to word the letter. In the letter, Wetterling asks the abductor if Jacob is still with him. She offers compassion for the abductor, and says that all little boys, including the abductor when he was one, deserve a happy childhood. She tells him she's sorry if he did not have one, that she does not see him as an ugly, dirty old man, and that she hopes that if he ever goes fishing and catches something he cooks it for Jacob. She writes that she and her family are looking for answers, that only he can answer them, and that she wants to know what became of Jacob after the kidnapping. The letter generated some tips, but nothing substantial.

Also in early 2004, news reports circulated that new evidence was being considered in the abduction of her son. News outlets in the Twin Cities indicated that another boy had been assaulted not long before Jacob disappeared. Police were also ruling out the long-held belief that the abductor had gotten away in a car.

On September 1, 2016, a person of interest named in the investigation reportedly decided to cooperate with authorities and led investigators to human remains. On September 3, Wetterling told television station KARE, a local NBC affiliate, that the remains found were indeed those of Jacob's. She said, "All I can confirm is that Jacob has been found and our hearts are broken. I am not responding to any media yet as I have no words."

== Philanthropy ==
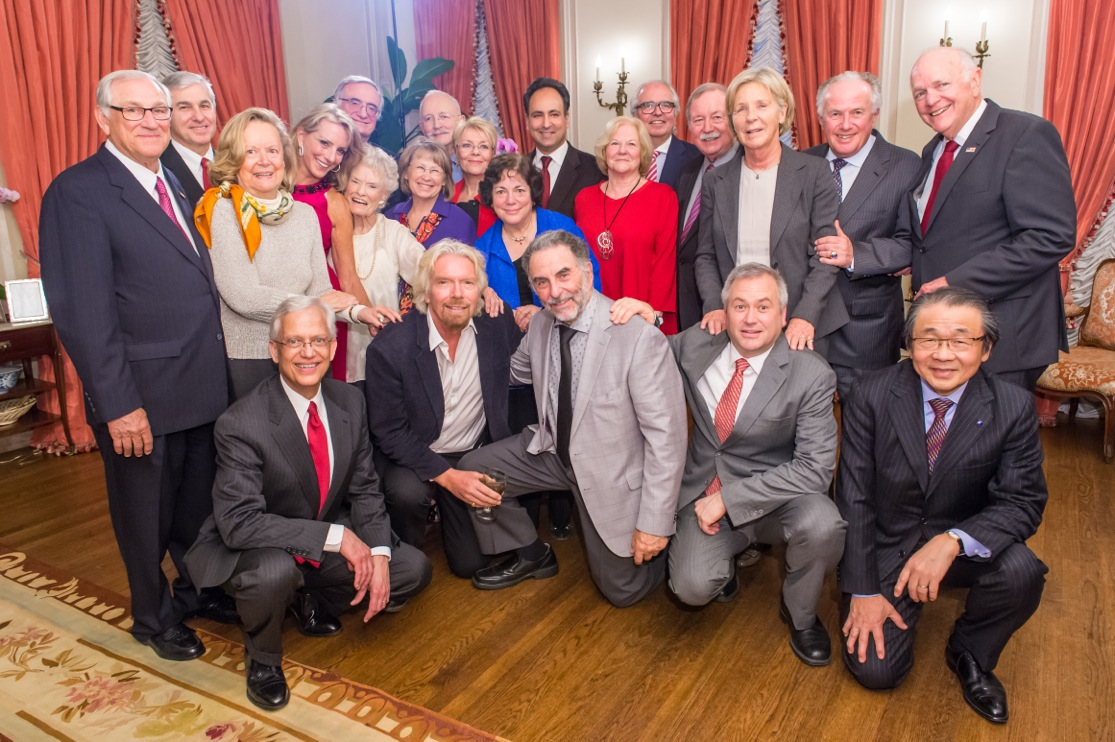
Patty Wetterling (in purple) with the Board of Directors of the International Centre for Missing & Exploited Children

Wetterling is a member of the Board of Directors of the International Centre for Missing & Exploited Children (ICMEC), a global nonprofit organization that combats child sexual exploitation, child pornography, and child abduction.

== Electoral history ==
- 2006 Race for U.S. House of Representatives - Minnesota 6th District
  - Michele Bachmann (R), 50%
  - Patty Wetterling (DFL), 42%
  - John Binkowski (I), 8%
- 2004 Race for U.S. House of Representatives - Minnesota 6th District
  - Mark Kennedy (R) (inc.), 54%
  - Patty Wetterling (DFL), 46%
