= Gaither =

Gaither may refer to:

== Places ==
In the United States

- Gaither, Maryland, an unincorporated community
- Gaither, Missouri, a ghost town
- Gaither Township, Boone County, Arkansas, a civil township

== People ==
=== As a surname ===
- Bailey Gaither (born 1997), American football player
- Benjamin Gaither (c. 1784–1838), founder of the U.S. city of Gaithersburg, MD
- Bill Gaither, various people
  - Bill Gaither Trio (AKA The Gaither Trio), an American gospel music group founded by Bill Gaither (gospel singer) (born 1936)
  - Gaither Homecoming, a series of videos, music recordings and concerts; organized, promoted and usually presented by the gospel singer Bill Gaither
  - Gaither Vocal Band, an American gospel music group founded by the gospel singer Bill Gaither
    - Gaither Vocal Band discography
- Burgess Sidney Gaither (1807–92), North Carolina politician and attorney who served in the Confederate States Congress during the American Civil War
- Daniele Gaither (born 1970), American comic actress
- Danny Gaither (1938–2001), American gospel music singer, onetime member of the Bill Gaither Trio
- David Gaither (born 1957), American businessman and politician in Minnesota
- Edmund Barry Gaither (born 1944), American museum curator
- Frances Gaither (1889–1955), American novelist
- Gloria Gaither (born 1942), American Christian songwriter, author, speaker, editor and academic, wife of the gospel singer Bill Gaither
- Horace Rowan Gaither (AKA H. Rowan Gaithier, 1909–61), American attorney, investment banker, and administrator at the Ford Foundation
  - Gaither Report, the report of the Security Resources Panel of the President's Science Advisory Committee, presented to President Eisenhower on November 7, 1957; entitled Deterrence & Survival in the Nuclear Age, but often referred to by the name of the Panel's chairman, H. Rowan Gauthier
- Henry Chew Gaither (1778–1845), U.S. politician in Maryland, father of William Lingan Gaither
- Israel Gaither (born c. 1945), American official in the Salvation Army
- Jake Gaither (1903–94), American college football coach
  - Jake Gaither Gymnasium, a multi-purpose arena in Tallahassee, FL, built in 1963 and named for Jake Gaither
- Jared Gaither (born 1986), American football player
- Katryna Gaither (born 1975), American female basketball player
- Marcus Gaither (1961–2020), American-French basketball player
- Nathan Gaither (1788–1862), U.S. Representative from Kentucky
- Omar Gaither (born 1984), American football player
- Ridgely Gaither (1903–92), American army general
- Scott Gaither (born 1969), American soccer player
- William Lingan Gaither (1813–58), U.S. politician in Maryland, son of Henry Chew Gaither
- William S. Gaither (1932–2009), American civil engineer and president of Drexel University

=== As a forename ===
- Alfred G. Allen (AKA Alfred Gaither Allen, 1867–1932), U.S. Representative from Ohio
- Gaither Carlton (1901–72), American old-time fiddle player and banjo player
- Joseph Gaither Pratt (1910–79), American psychologist who specialized in the field of parapsychology

== Other ==
- Gaither High School, a public high school located in the Northdale area of Hillsborough County, FL; named after its onetime principal Vivian Gaither
- Gaither House (disambiguation), various U.S. historic buildings

== See also ==
- Gaithersburg, Maryland, a U.S. city founded by Benjamin Gaither
- Lita Gaithers (born before 1999), American singer-songwriter, actress, and playwright
- Gaultier (disambiguation)
- Gauthier (disambiguation)
- Gautier (disambiguation)
