= Senator Gaither =

Senator Gaither may refer to:

- Burgess Sidney Gaither (1807–1892), North Carolina State Senate
- David Gaither (born 1957), Minnesota State Senate
- William Lingan Gaither (died 1858), Maryland State Senate
