= National Register of Historic Places listings in Adair County, Kentucky =

Location of Adair County in Kentucky

This is a list of the National Register of Historic Places listings in Adair County, Kentucky.

It is intended to be a complete list of the properties on the National Register of Historic Places in Adair County, Kentucky, United States. The locations of National Register properties for which the latitude and longitude coordinates are included below, may be seen in a map.

There are 10 properties listed on the National Register in the county.

This National Park Service list is complete through NPS recent listings posted December 12, 2025.

== Current listings ==
	Name on the Register	Image	Date listed	Location	City or town	Description
1	Adair County Courthouse	Adair County Courthouse	August 27, 1974 (#74000847)	500 Public Sq. 37°06′10″N 85°18′22″W	Columbia	
2	Archeological Site 15 Ad 33		December 8, 1978 (#78001292)	Address Restricted	Columbia	
3	Archeological Site 15 Ad 36		November 16, 1978 (#78001295)	Address Restricted	Glens Fork	
4	Archeological Site 15 Ad 54		November 16, 1978 (#78001293)	Address Restricted	Columbia	
5	Columbia Commercial Historic District	Columbia Commercial Historic District	March 13, 2017 (#100000733)	Roughly centered around the Columbia Public Square; 37°06′11″N 85°18′22″W	Columbia	
6	John Field House	John Field House	February 8, 1978 (#78001294)	111 E. Fortune St. 37°06′05″N 85°18′22″W	Columbia	
7	Dr. Nathan Gaither House	Dr. Nathan Gaither House	March 21, 1979 (#79000956)	100 S. High St. 37°06′15″N 85°18′28″W	Columbia	
8	Janice Holt and Henry Giles Log House	Janice Holt and Henry Giles Log House	November 6, 1997 (#97001237)	302 Spout Springs Rd. 37°12′17″N 85°08′52″W	Knifley	
9	Daniel Trabue House	Daniel Trabue House	December 16, 1974 (#74000848)	299 Jamestown St. 37°06′02″N 85°18′11″W	Columbia	
10	Zion Meetinghouse and School	Zion Meetinghouse and School	May 13, 1976 (#76000843)	Southeast of Columbia on KY 55; 37°03′02″N 85°15′44″W	Columbia	1837-built brick meetinghouse and 1864-built brick school.

== See also ==
- List of National Historic Landmarks in Kentucky
