= Gaither House =

Gaither House may refer to:

- Dr. Nathan Gaither House, Columbia, Kentucky, listed on the NRHP in Adair County, Kentucky
- Gaither House (Harmony, North Carolina), listed on the NRHP in North Carolina
- Gaither House (Morganton, North Carolina), listed on the NRHP in Burke County, North Carolina
