= Bill Gaither (disambiguation) =

Bill Gaither is an American gospel singer.

Bill Gaither or William Gaither may also refer to:

- Bill Gaither (blues musician) (William Arthur Gaither, 1910–1970), American blues musician
- William S. Gaither, civil engineer and president of Drexel University
- William Lingan Gaither, Maryland politician
- Billy Jack Gaither, American gay murder victim
