= 2008 United States House of Representatives elections in Minnesota =

- November 4, 2008

All 8 Minnesota seats to the United States House of Representatives
	Majority party	Minority party
Party	Democratic (DFL)	Republican
Last election	5 seats, 52.90%	3 seats, 42.43%
Seats before	5	3
Seats won	5	3
Seat change	Steady	Steady
Popular vote	1,612,480	1,069,015
Percentage	57.53%	38.14%
Swing	▲4.63%	▼4.29%

Democratic
40–50%
50–60%
60–70%
70–80%
80–90%
Republican
40–50%
50–60%
60–70%

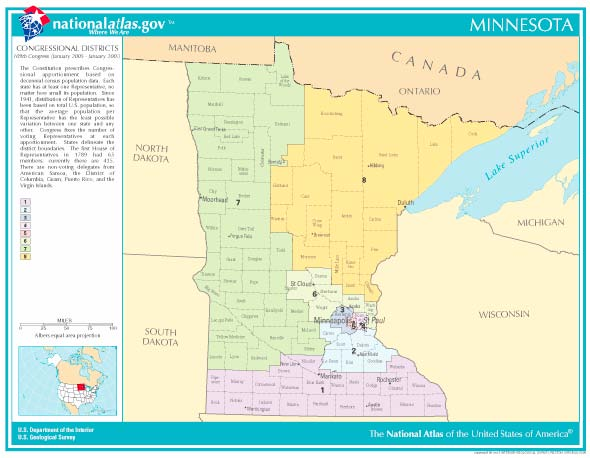
Map of Minnesota showing all eight districts

The 2008 Minnesota U.S. House of Representatives elections took place on November 4, 2008. All eight congressional seats that make up the state's delegation were contested. Representatives were elected for two-year terms; those elected served in the 111th United States Congress from January 4, 2009, until January 3, 2011. Primary elections were held on September 9 2008.

The 2008 presidential election, 2008 Senate election (for the seat held by Republican Norm Coleman), and 2008 Minnesota Legislature elections occurred on the same date, as did many local elections and ballot initiatives.

The 110th congressional delegation from the U.S. state of Minnesota had three Republicans and five Democratic-Farmer-Labor Party members (DFLers). Six were men; two were women. Three were freshmen in the 110th congress. The veterans ranged in experience from Jim Oberstar with 33 years of experience and the chairman of the Transportation Committee, to John Kline with just four years of experience.

== Overview ==
=== Statewide ===
Party	Candidates	Votes		Seats		
Party	Candidates	No.	%	No.	+/–	%
Democratic-Farmer-Labor	8	1,612,480	57.53	5	Steady	62.50
Republican	8	1,069,015	38.14	3	Steady	37.50
Independence	4	116,835	4.17	0	Steady	0.0
Write-in	8	4,284	0.15	0	Steady	0.0
Total	28	2,802,614	100.0	8	Steady	100.0

Popular vote
Democratic	57.53%
Republican	38.14%
Independence	4.17%
Other	0.15%

House seats
Democratic	62.50%
Republican	37.50%

=== By district ===
Results of the 2008 United States House of Representatives elections in Minnesota by district:

District	Democratic		Republican		Others		Total		Result
District	Votes	%	Votes	%	Votes	%	Votes	%	Result
District 1	207,753	62.50%	109,453	32.93%	15,194	4.57%	332,400	100.0%	Democratic hold
District 2	164,093	42.55%	220,924	57.29%	639	0.16%	385,656	100.0%	Republican hold
District 3	150,787	40.85%	178,932	48.48%	39,385	10.67%	369,104	100.0%	Republican hold
District 4	216,267	68.44%	98,936	31.31%	815	0.26%	316,018	100.0%	Democratic hold
District 5	228,776	70.88%	71,020	22.00%	22,951	7.12%	322,747	100.0%	Democratic hold
District 6	175,786	43.43%	187,817	46.41%	41,122	10.15%	404,725	100.0%	Republican hold
District 7	227,187	72.20%	87,062	27.67%	431	0.14%	314,680	100.0%	Democratic hold
District 8	241,831	67.69%	114,871	32.15%	582	0.16%	357,284	100.0%	Democratic hold
Total	1,612,480	57.53%	1,069,015	38.14%	121,119	4.32%	2,802,614	100.0%	

== District 1 ==
2008 Minnesota's 1st congressional district election
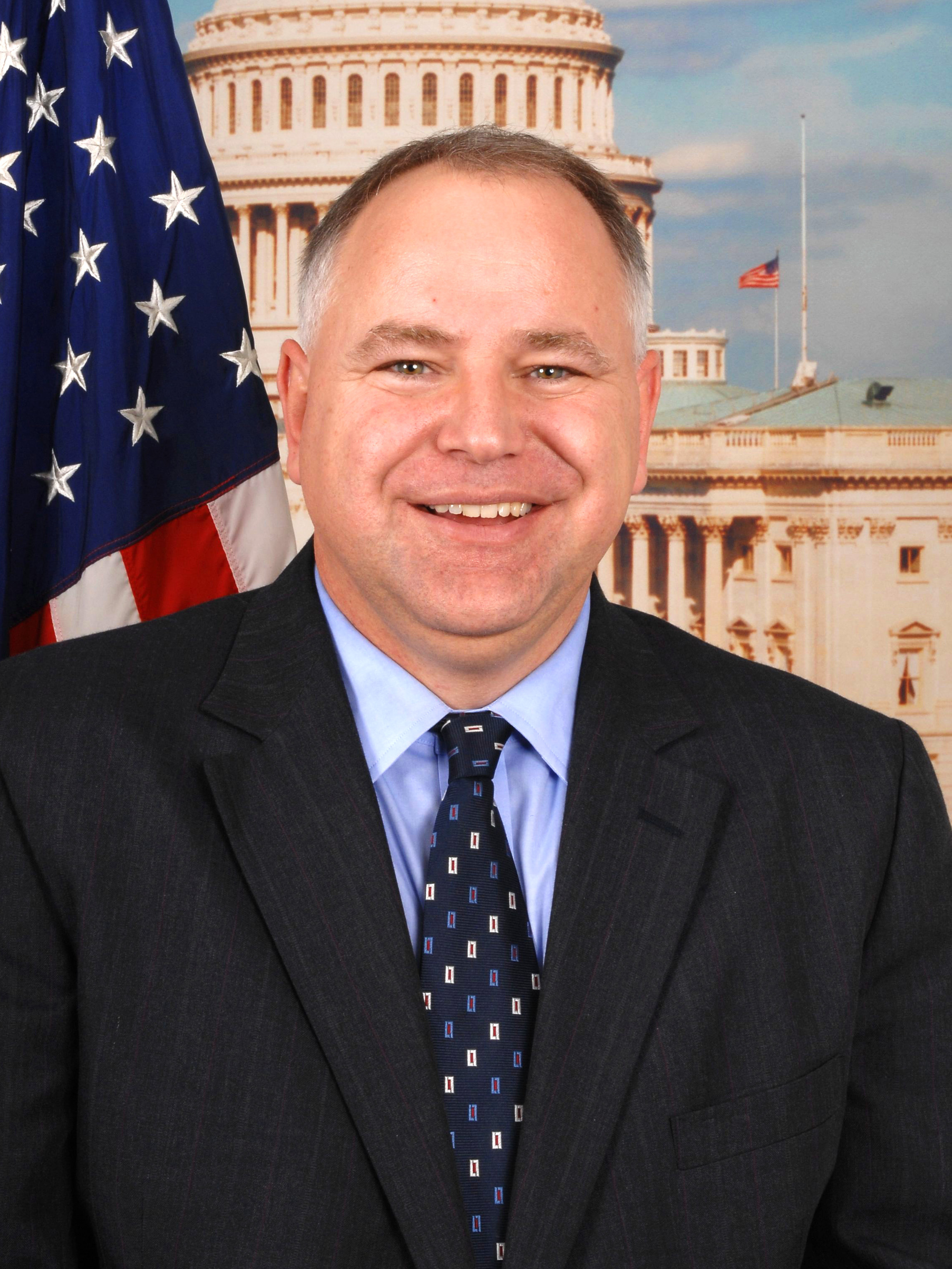

Nominee	Tim Walz	Brian J. Davis
Party	Democratic (DFL)	Republican
Popular vote	207,753	109,453
Percentage	62.5%	32.9%
- Walz: 40–50% 50–60% 60–70% 70–80% 80–90% >90% Davis: 40–50% 50–60% 60–70% 70–80% Tie: 40–50% 50% No votes
U.S. Representative before election
Tim Walz
Democratic (DFL)
Elected U.S. Representative
Tim Walz
Democratic (DFL)

This district extended across southern Minnesota from the border with South Dakota to the border of Wisconsin. Incumbent Democrat Tim Walz, who had represented the district since 2007, ran for re-election. He was elected with 53% of the vote in 2006, defeating 6-term Republican Gil Gutknecht in somewhat of a surprise victory. The district had a PVI of R+1.

=== Democratic primary ===
Walz, a former teacher and command sergeant major in the National Guard, had no opponent in the race for the DFL nomination for the seat in the September 12, 2008 primary election.

==== Candidates ====
===== Nominee =====
- Tim Walz, incumbent U.S. representative

==== Results ====
Democratic primary election
Party	Candidate	Votes	%
Democratic (DFL)	Tim Walz (incumbent)	20,998	100.0
Total votes		20,998	100.0

=== Republican primary ===
==== Candidates ====
===== Nominee =====
- Brian J. Davis, Mayo Clinic physician

===== Eliminated in primary =====
- Dick Day, state senator and former state senate Majority Leader (1997–2007)

===== Withdrawn =====
- Randy Demmer, state representative
- Mark Meyer, actuary, lawyer and member of the Lake Crystal Wellcome Memorial School Board

==== Results ====
Republican primary election
Party	Candidate	Votes	%
Republican	Brian J. Davis	17,196	66.7
Republican	Dick Day	8,480	33.0
Total votes		25,676	100.0

=== Independence primary ===
==== Candidates ====
===== Nominee =====
- Gregory Mikkelson, small business owner, farmer, nominee for this seat in 2004, Green nominee for this seat in 2002 and Republican candidate in 2006

==== Results ====
Independence primary election
Party	Candidate	Votes	%
Independence	Gregory Mikkelson	1,043	100.0
Total votes		1,043	100.0

=== General election ===
==== Endorsements ====
Tim Walz (DFL)

Labor unions

- AFL-CIO

Organizations

- Citizens for Global Solutions
- Democratic Congressional Campaign Committee "Frontline" Program
- NRA Political Victory Fund
- Planned Parenthood Action Fund
- Sierra Club
- VoteVets

==== Predictions ====
Source	Ranking	As of
The Cook Political Report	Likely D	November 6, 2008
Rothenberg	Safe D	November 2, 2008
Sabato's Crystal Ball	Lean D	November 6, 2008
Real Clear Politics	Safe D	November 7, 2008
CQ Politics	Likely D	November 6, 2008

==== Results ====
Walz won a second term, garnering 62.5% of the vote.

Minnesota's 1st congressional district election, 2008
Party	Candidate	Votes	%
Democratic (DFL)	Tim Walz (incumbent)	207,753	62.5
Republican	Brian Davis	109,453	32.9
Independence	Gregory Mikkelson	14,904	4.5
Write-in		290	0.1
Total votes		332,400	100.0
Democratic (DFL) hold			

==== Finances ====
===== Campaigns =====
Candidate (party)	Raised	Spent	Cash on hand
Tim Walz (DFL)	$2,729,819	$2,704,466	$30,528
Brian Davis (R)	$849,200	$846,278	$2,922
Gregory Mikkelson (I)	Unreported		

===== Outside Spending =====
Candidate (party)	Supported	Opposed
Tim Walz (DFL)	$57,889	$0
Brian Davis (R)	$31,301	$0
Gregory Mikkelson (I)	$0	$0

== District 2 ==
2008 Minnesota's 2nd congressional district election
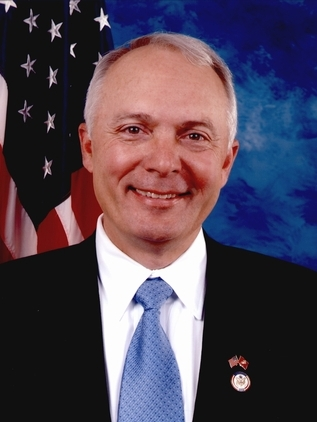

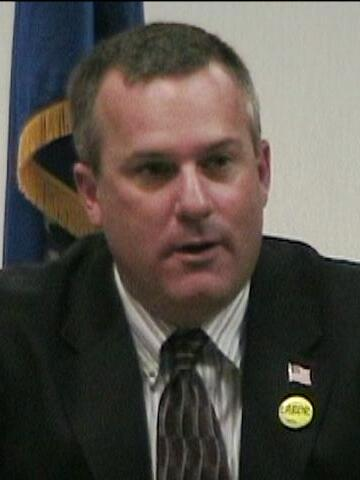
Nominee	John Kline	Steve Sarvi
Party	Republican	Democratic (DFL)
Popular vote	220,924	164,093
Percentage	57.3%	42.5%
- Precinct results Kline: 50–60% 60–70% 70–80% >90% Sarvi: 50–60% 60–70% 70–80% >90% Tie: 50% No votes
U.S. Representative before election
John Kline
Republican
Elected U.S. Representative
John Kline
Republican

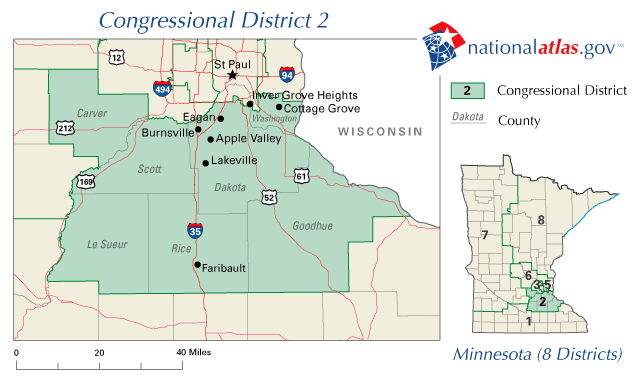

This district spans the width of the entire southern metro area and contains all of Carver, Scott, Le Sueur, Goodhue and Rice counties and most of Dakota County. Incumbent Republican John Kline, who had represented the district since 2003, ran for re-election. He was re-elected with 56.2% of the vote in 2006. The district had a PVI of R+3.

=== Republican primary ===
Republican John Kline held on to the second district seat in 2006, defeating DFL challenger, former FBI agent Coleen Rowley. The district Republican lean, Kline's unwavering support for Bush and the Iraq War did not make him appear too vulnerable to a challenger in 2008.

==== Candidates ====
===== Nominee =====
- John Kline, incumbent U.S. representative

=== Democratic primary ===
On October 4, 2007, Iraq War veteran Steve Sarvi announced he would challenge Kline for the seat. His experience also included being mayor of Watertown, Minnesota and city administrator for Victoria, Minnesota. He believed that a change in U.S. policy in Iraq was needed. On May 3, Sarvi was endorsed by the 2nd District DFL party.

==== Candidates ====
===== Nominee =====
- Steve Sarvi, Iraq War veteran and former mayor of Watertown

===== Withdrawn =====
- Dan Powers, construction contractor

=== General election ===
==== Endorsements ====
John Kline (R)

Organizations

- NRA Political Victory Fund
Steve Sarvi (DFL)

U.S. representatives

- Tim Walz, U.S. representative from Minnesota's 1st congressional district (2007–present)
- Betty McCollum, U.S. representative from Minnesota's 4th congressional district (2001–present)
- Keith Ellison, U.S. representative from Minnesota's 5th congressional district (2007–present)
- Jim Oberstar, U.S. representative from Minnesota's 8th congressional district (1975–present)
- Donald M. Fraser, U.S. representative from Minnesota's 5th congressional district (1963–1979) and former Mayor of Minneapolis (1980–1994)

State legislators

- Harry A. Sieben, former Speaker of the Minnesota House of Representatives
- Jim Carlson, state senator
- Kevin Dahle, state senator
- Sharon Marko, former state senator
- Steve Murphy, state senator
- Katie Sieben, state senator
- Joe Atkins, state representative
- Karla Bigham, state representative

Labor unions

- AFL-CIO
- American Federation of Government Employees
- Brotherhood of Locomotive Engineers and Trainmen
- Communication Workers of America
- International Association of Machinists and Aerospace Workers
- International Brotherhood of Electrical Workers
- International Brotherhood of Teamsters
- International Union of Operating Engineers
- Laborers' International Union of North America
- Minnesota Nurses Association
- Service Employees International Union
- United Food and Commercial Workers
- United Steelworkers

Organizations

- Alliance for Retired Americans
- Citizens for Global Solutions
- Clean Water Action
- Democratic Congressional Campaign Committee "Emerging Races" Program
- Education Minnesota
- Independence Party of Minnesota
- Planned Parenthood Action Fund
- Sierra Club
- Veterans' Alliance for Security and Democracy
- VoteVets

==== Predictions ====
Source	Ranking	As of
The Cook Political Report	Likely R	November 6, 2008
Rothenberg	Safe R	November 2, 2008
Sabato's Crystal Ball	Safe R	November 6, 2008
Real Clear Politics	Safe R	November 7, 2008
CQ Politics	Likely R	November 6, 2008

==== Results ====
Kline won garnering 57.3% of the vote.

Minnesota's 2nd congressional district election, 2008
Party	Candidate	Votes	%
Republican	John Kline (incumbent)	220,924	57.3
Democratic (DFL)	Steve Sarvi	164,093	42.5
Write-in		639	0.2
Total votes		385,656	100.0
Republican hold			

==== Finances ====
===== Campaigns =====
Candidate (party)	Raised	Spent	Cash on hand
John Kline (R)	$1,464,906	$1,484,962	$0
Steve Sarvi (DFL)	$559,473	$559,474	$0

===== Outside Spending =====
Candidate (party)	Supported	Opposed
John Kline (R)	$3,287	$4,417
Steve Sarvi (DFL)	$20,012	$0

== District 3 ==
2008 Minnesota's 3rd congressional district election
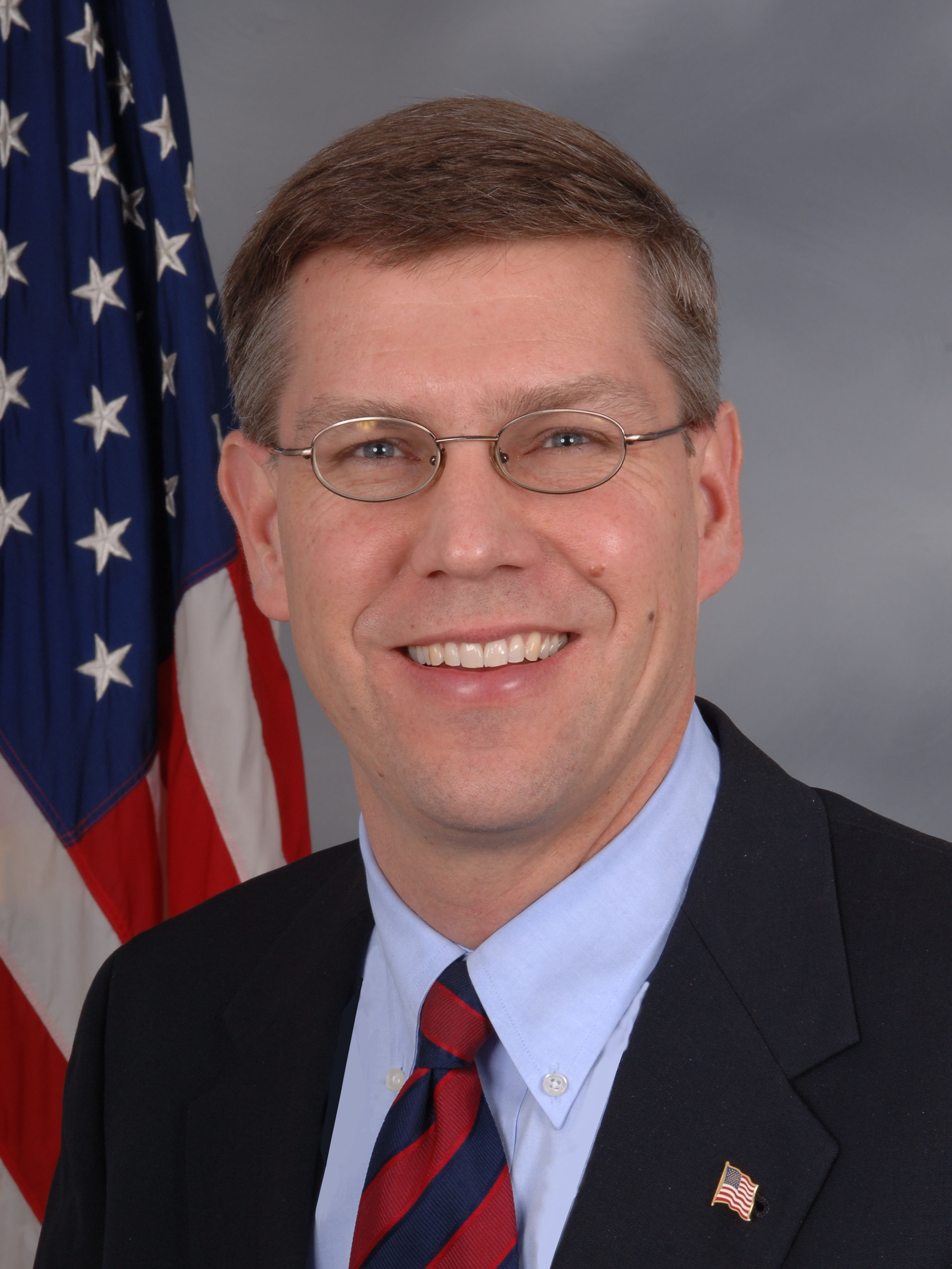

Nominee	Erik Paulsen	Ashwin Madia	David Dillon
Party	Republican	Democratic (DFL)	Independence
Popular vote	178,932	150,787	38,970
Percentage	48.5%	40.9%	10.7%
- Precinct results Paulsen: 40–50% 50–60% 60–70% Madia: 40–50% 50–60% 60–70% 70–80%
U.S. Representative before election
Jim Ramstad
Republican
Elected U.S. Representative
Erik Paulsen
Republican

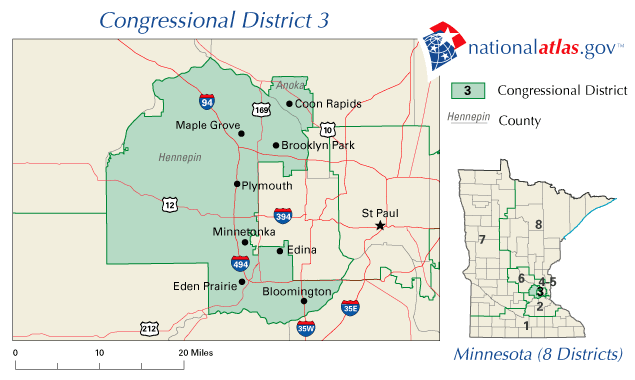

This district encompasses the suburbs of Hennepin County to the north, west, and south of Minneapolis. Incumbent Republican Jim Ramstad, who had represented the district since 1991, announced on September 17, 2007, that he would not seek re-election in 2008. He was re-elected with 64.9% of the vote in 2006, and the district had a PVI of Even.

=== Republican primary ===
==== Candidates ====
===== Nominee =====
- Erik Paulsen, state representative from district 42B since 1995, and former Minnesota House Majority Leader (2003–2007)

==== Declined ====
- Jim Ramstad, incumbent U.S. Representative

==== Results ====
Republican primary election
Party	Candidate	Votes	%
Republican	Erik Paulsen	14,187	100.0
Total votes		14,187	100.0

=== Democratic primary ===
Pro-business and centrist state senator Terri Bonoff entered the race as the favourite to win the nomination, raising about $300,000 in the first several months of her campaign. However political newcomer (and former Republican) Ashwin Madia was able to defeat her at the nominating convention, prompting her withdrawal.

==== Candidates ====
===== Nominee =====
- Ashwin Madia, attorney and Iraq War veteran

===== Withdrawn =====
- Terri Bonoff, state senator
- Jim Hovland, mayor of Edina (withdrew March 2008)

==== Endorsements ====
Terri Bonoff

Labor unions

- American Federation of State, County and Municipal Employees

Organizations

- Association of Community Organizations for Reform Now
- EMILYs List
- Minnesota Forward
Ashwin Madia

U.S. representatives

- Keith Ellison, U.S. representative from Minnesota's 5th congressional district (2007–present)

Organizations

- VoteVets

==== Results ====
Democratic primary election
Party	Candidate	Votes	%
Democratic (DFL)	Ashwin Madia	20,830	100.0
Total votes		20,830	100.0

=== Independence primary ===
==== Candidates ====
===== Nominee =====
- David Dillon, businessman

===== Eliminated in primary =====
- Steev Ramsdell, massage therapy center operator

==== Results ====
Independence primary election
Party	Candidate	Votes	%
Independence	David Dillon	674	72.8
Independence	Steev Ramsdell	252	27.2
Total votes		926	100.0

=== Constitution primary ===
==== Candidates ====
===== Withdrawn =====
- Harley Swarm, mechanical engineer

=== General election ===
==== Endorsements ====
Erik Paulsen (R)

Organizations

- NRA Political Victory Fund
Ashwin Madia (DFL)

U.S. representatives

- Keith Ellison, U.S. representative from Minnesota's 5th congressional district (2007–present)

Labor unions

- AFL-CIO

Organizations

- Democratic Congressional Campaign Committee "Red to Blue" Program
- Planned Parenthood Action Fund
- Sierra Club
- Stonewall Democrats
- Veterans' Alliance for Security and Democracy
- VoteVets

==== Polling ====
Poll source	Date(s) administered	Sample size	Margin of error	Erik Paulsen (R)	Ashwin Madia (DFL)	David Dillon (IP)	Undecided
SurveyUSA	October 29–30, 2008	647	± 3.9%	46%	41%	10%	3%
SurveyUSA	October 26–27, 2008	643	± 3.9%	45%	44%	9%	2%
SurveyUSA	October 6–7, 2008	634	± 4.0%	43%	46%	8%	3%
Bennett, Petts and Normington (D-DCCC)	September 29–30, 2008	400	± 4.9%	39%	44%	8%	9%
SurveyUSA	August 26–28, 2008	636	± 4.0%	44%	41%	10%	6%

==== Predictions ====
Source	Ranking	As of
The Cook Political Report	Tossup	November 6, 2008
Rothenberg	Lean D (flip)	November 2, 2008
Sabato's Crystal Ball	Lean R	November 6, 2008
Real Clear Politics	Tossup	November 7, 2008
CQ Politics	Tossup	November 6, 2008

==== Results ====
Paulsen won the 2008 race, garnering 48.5% of the vote.

Minnesota's 3rd congressional district election, 2008
Party	Candidate	Votes	%
Republican	Erik Paulsen	178,932	48.5
Democratic (DFL)	Ashwin Madia	150,787	40.9
Independence	David Dillon	38,970	10.6
Write-in		415	0.1
Total votes		369,104	100.0
Republican hold			

==== Finances ====
===== Campaigns =====
Candidate (party)	Raised	Spent	Cash on hand
Erik Paulsen (R)	$2,781,437	$2,744,927	$36,509
Ashwin Madia (DFL)	$2,734,890	$2,726,040	$8,849
David Dillon (I)	$66,900	$66,896	$94,285

===== Outside Spending =====
Candidate (party)	Supported	Opposed
Erik Paulsen (R)	$122,480	$665,688
Ashwin Madia (DFL)	$754,248	$1,048,053
David Dillon (I)	$0	$20,317

== District 4 ==
2008 Minnesota's 4th congressional district election
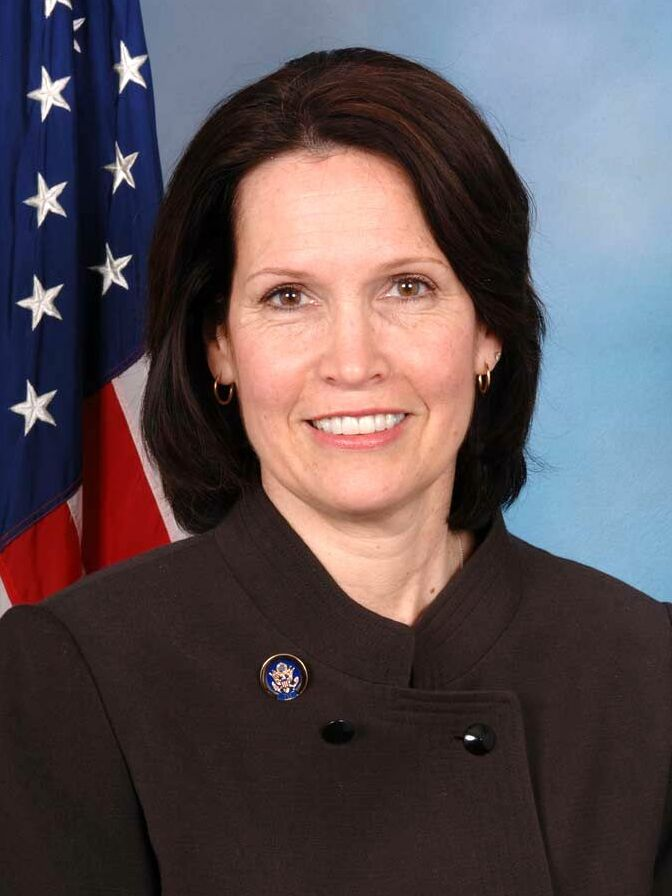

Nominee	Betty McCollum	Ed Matthews
Party	Democratic (DFL)	Republican
Popular vote	216,267	98,936
Percentage	68.4%	31.3%
- Precinct results McCollum: 50–60% 60–70% 70–80% 80–90% >90% Matthews: 50–60% 60–70%
U.S. Representative before election
Betty McCollum
Democratic (DFL)
Elected U.S. Representative
Betty McCollum
Democratic (DFL)

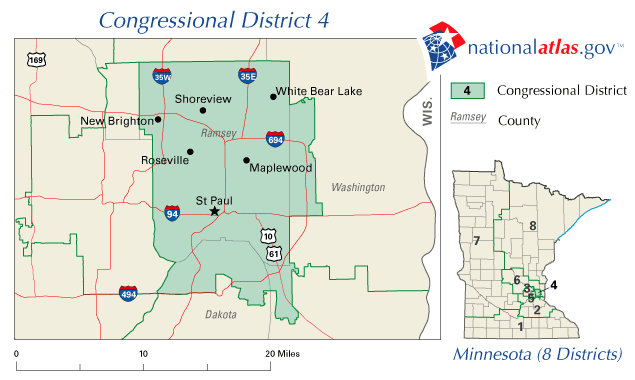

This district covers most of Ramsey County including all of Saint Paul and several Saint Paul suburbs. Incumbent Democrat Betty McCollum, who had represented the district since 2001, ran for re-election. She was re-elected with 69.5% of the vote in 2006, and the district had a PVI of D+13.

=== Democratic primary ===
==== Candidates ====
===== Nominee =====
- Betty McCollum, incumbent U.S. representative

=== Republican primary ===
==== Candidates ====
===== Nominee =====
- Ed Matthews, attorney

=== General election ===
==== Endorsements ====
Betty McCollum (DFL)

Labor unions

- AFL-CIO

Organizations

- Citizens for Global Solutions
- Planned Parenthood Action Fund
- Sierra Club
- Stonewall Democrats
Ed Matthews (R)

Organizations

- Republican Liberty Caucus

==== Predictions ====
Source	Ranking	As of
The Cook Political Report	Safe D	November 6, 2008
Rothenberg	Safe D	November 2, 2008
Sabato's Crystal Ball	Safe D	November 6, 2008
Real Clear Politics	Safe D	November 7, 2008
CQ Politics	Safe D	November 6, 2008

==== Results ====
McCollum won the race, garnering 68.4% of the vote.

Minnesota's 4th congressional district election, 2008
Party	Candidate	Votes	%
Democratic (DFL)	Betty McCollum (incumbent)	216,267	68.4
Republican	Ed Matthews	98,936	31.3
Write-in		815	0.3
Total votes		316,018	100.0
Democratic (DFL) hold			

==== Finances ====
===== Campaigns =====
Candidate (party)	Raised	Spent	Cash on hand
Betty McCollum (DFL)	$722,054	$719,710	$77,255
Ed Matthews (R)	$84,061	$77,148	$6,909

===== Outside Spending =====
Candidate (party)	Supported	Opposed
Betty McCollum (DFL)	$3,795	$0
Ed Matthews (R)	$3	$0

== District 5 ==
2008 Minnesota's 5th congressional district election
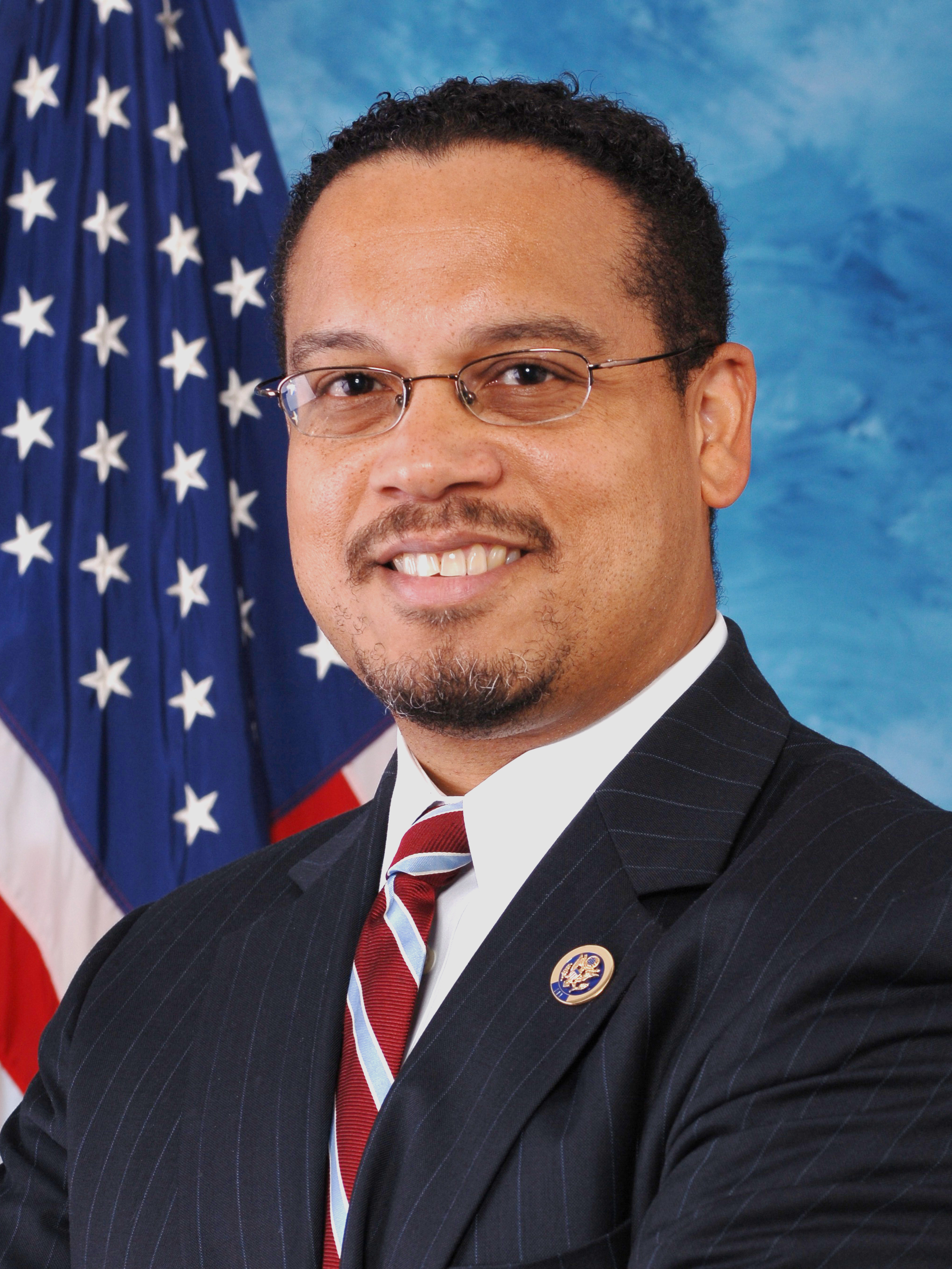

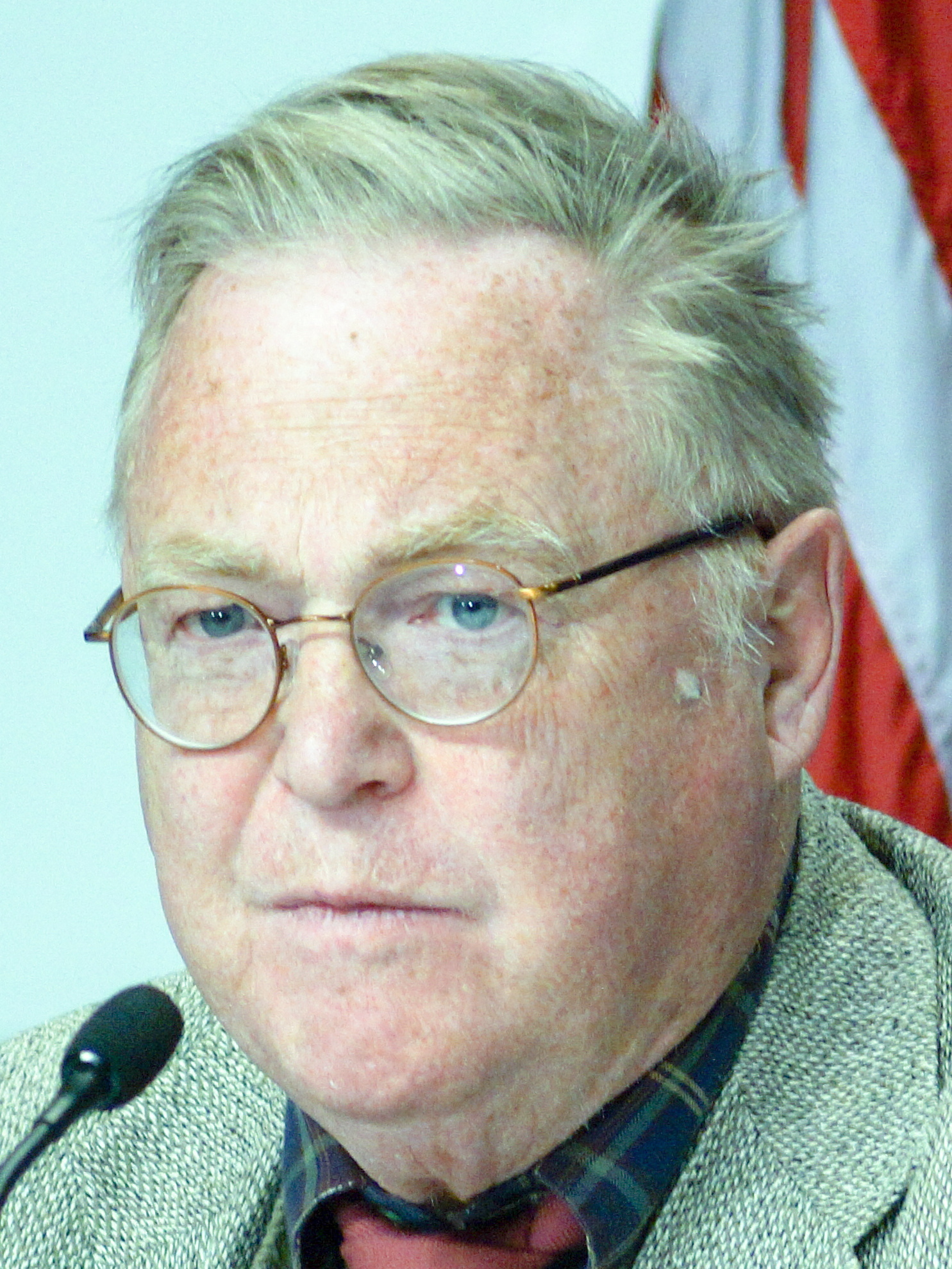
Nominee	Keith Ellison	Barb Davis White	Bill McGaughey
Party	Democratic (DFL)	Republican	Independence
Popular vote	216,267	71,020	22,318
Percentage	70.9%	22.0%	6.9%
- Precinct results Ellison: 50–60% 60–70% 70–80% 80–90% >90%
U.S. Representative before election
Keith Ellison
Democratic (DFL)
Elected U.S. Representative
Keith Ellison
Democratic (DFL)

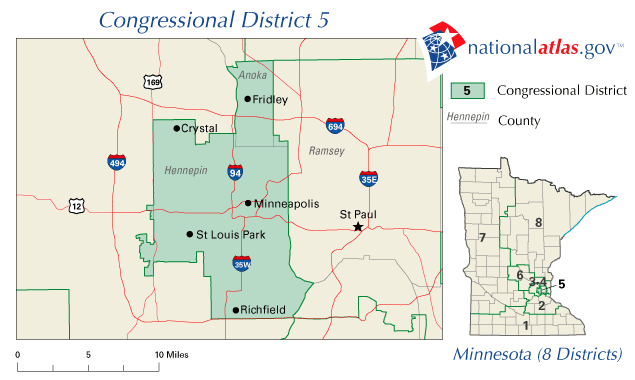

This district covers eastern Hennepin County, including the entire city of Minneapolis, Minnesota, along with parts of Anoka and Ramsey counties. Incumbent Democrat Keith Ellison, who had represented the district since 2007, ran for re-election. He was elected with 55.6% of the vote in 2006, and the district had a PVI of D+21. He was the first African American U.S. representative from Minnesota as well as the first Muslim member of the U.S. Congress.

=== Democratic primary ===
==== Candidates ====
===== Nominee =====
- Keith Ellison, incumbent U.S. representative

===== Eliminated in primary =====
- Gregg A. Iverson, perennial candidate and U.S. Army veteran

==== Results ====
Democratic primary election
Party	Candidate	Votes	%
Democratic (DFL)	Keith Ellison	33,988	84.5
Democratic (DFL)	Gregg A. Iverson	6,251	15.5
Total votes		40,239	100.0

=== Republican primary ===
==== Candidates ====
===== Nominee =====
- Barb Davis White, minister, author, and civil rights activist

==== Results ====
Republican primary election
Party	Candidate	Votes	%
Republican	Barb Davis White	5,284	100.0
Total votes		5,284	100.0

=== Independence primary ===
==== Candidates ====
===== Nominee =====
- William (Bill) McGaughey, landlord and candidate for U.S. Senator 2002

==== Results ====
Independence Party primary election
Party	Candidate	Votes	%
Independence	Bill McGaughey	828	100.0
Total votes		828	100.0

=== General election ===
==== Endorsements ====
Keith Ellison (DFL)

Labor unions

- AFL-CIO

Organizations

- Citizens for Global Solutions
- Planned Parenthood Action Fund
- Sierra Club
- Stonewall Democrats
Barb Davis White (R)

Organizations

- Republican Liberty Caucus

==== Predictions ====
Source	Ranking	As of
The Cook Political Report	Safe D	November 6, 2008
Rothenberg	Safe D	November 2, 2008
Sabato's Crystal Ball	Safe D	November 6, 2008
Real Clear Politics	Safe D	November 7, 2008
CQ Politics	Safe D	November 6, 2008

==== Results ====
Minnesota's 5th congressional district election, 2008
Party	Candidate	Votes	%
Democratic (DFL)	Keith Ellison (incumbent)	228,776	70.9
Republican	Barb Davis White	71,020	22.0
Independence	Bill McGaughey	22,318	6.9
Write-in		633	0.2
Total votes		322,747	100.0
Democratic (DFL) hold			

==== Finances ====
===== Campaigns =====
Candidate (party)	Raised	Spent	Cash on hand
Keith Ellison (DFL)	$1,530,396	$1,476,449	$61,922
Barb Davis White (R)	$62,099	$55,796	$6,634
Bill McGaughey (I)	Unreported		

===== Outside Spending =====
Candidate (party)	Supported	Opposed
Keith Ellison (DFL)	$5,807	$0
Barb Davis White (R)	$3	$0
Bill McGaughey (I)	$0	$0

== District 6 ==
2008 Minnesota's 6th congressional district election
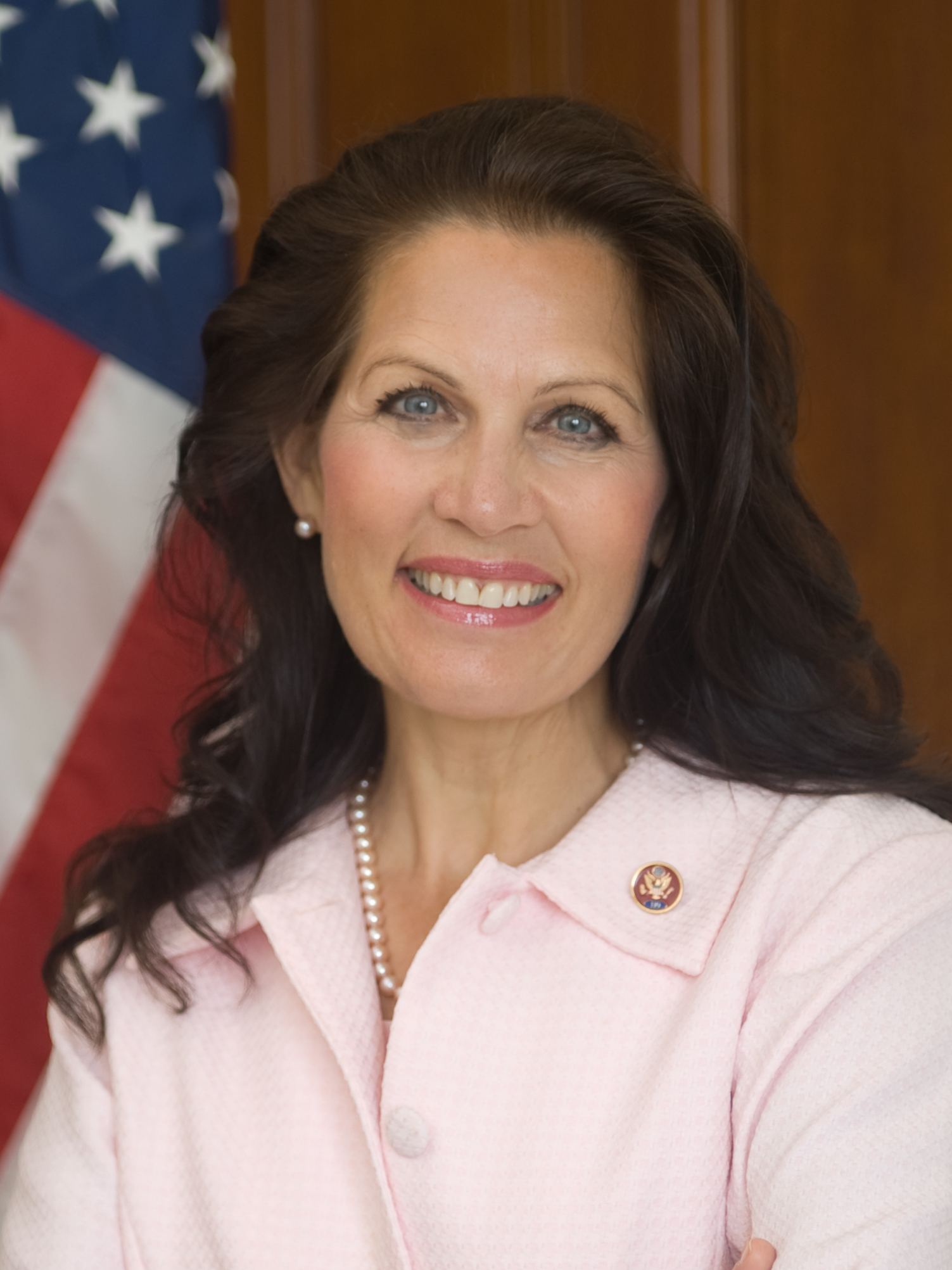

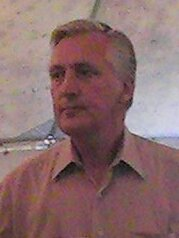

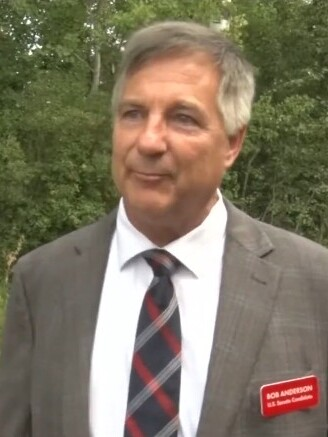
Nominee	Michele Bachmann	El Tinklenberg	Bob Anderson
Party	Republican	Democratic (DFL)	Independence
Popular vote	187,817	175,786	40,643
Percentage	46.4%	43.4%	10.0%
- Precinct results Bachmann: 40–50% 50–60% 60–70% Tinklenberg: 40–50% 50–60% 60–70% Tie: 40–50% 50% No votes
U.S. Representative before election
Michele Bachmann
Republican
Elected U.S. Representative
Michele Bachmann
Republican

This district includes most or all of Benton, Sherburne, Stearns, Wright, Anoka, and Washington counties. Incumbent Republican Michele Bachmann, who had represented the district since 2007, ran for re-election. She was elected with 50.1% of the vote in 2006, and the district had a PVI of R+5.

=== Republican primary ===
Bachmann won a hard-fought battle against Patty Wetterling in 2006, with the help of Karl Rove and Dick Cheney campaigning on her behalf and a multimillion-dollar warchest.

==== Candidates ====
===== Nominee =====
- Michele Bachmann, incumbent U.S. representative

===== Eliminated in primary =====
- Aubrey Immelman, associate professor of psychology

==== Results ====
Republican primary election
Party	Candidate	Votes	%
Republican	Michele Bachmann (incumbent)	19,127	85.9
Republican	Aubrey Immelman	3,134	14.1
Total votes		22,261	100.0

=== Democratic primary ===
==== Candidates ====
===== Nominee =====
- Elwyn Tinklenberg, former Minnesota Commissioner of Transportation (1999–2002), former mayor of Blaine, former Methodist minister and candidate for this seat in 2006

===== Withdrawn =====
- Bob Olson, banker, tax lawyer and nominee for this seat in 1994

==== Results ====
Democratic primary election
Party	Candidate	Votes	%
Democratic (DFL)	El Tinklenberg	17,474	100.0
Total votes		17,474	100.0

=== Independence primary ===
==== Candidates ====
===== Nominee =====
- Bob Anderson, dental technician

==== Results ====
Independence Party primary election
Party	Candidate	Votes	%
Independence	Bob Anderson	828	100.0
Total votes		828	100.0

=== General election ===
==== Campaign ====
Bachmann's charges about "anti-American views" shifted the political dynamics of this campaign, giving a lift to Tinklenberg's candidacy and attracting $1.3 million in new contributions, plus $1 million from the DNC. At the same time, the RNC withdrew media buys on behalf of Bachmann.

===== Endorsements =====
Michele Bachmann (R)

Organizations

- Eagle Forum
- NRA Political Victory Fund
Elwyn Tinklenberg (DFL)

Labor unions

- AFL-CIO
- American Federation of State, County and Municipal Employees

Organizations

- Stonewall Democrats

==== Polling ====
Poll source	Date(s) administered	Sample size	Margin of error	Michele Bachmann (R)	Elwyn Tinklenberg (DFL)	Bob Anderson (IP)	Undecided
SurveyUSA	October 29–30, 2008	625	± 4.0%	46%	45%	6%	3%
Minnesota Public Radio	October 21–23, 2008	430	± 4.7%	43%	45%	5%	7%
SurveyUSA	October 21–22, 2008	621	± 4.0%	44%	47%	6%	2%
Grove Insight (D-DCCC)	October 10–12, 2008	400	± 4.9%	42%	38%	5%	15%

==== Predictions ====
CQ Politics changed its forecast from 'Republican Favored' to 'Leans Republican' on October 20, and then to 'No Clear Favorite' on October 28. The Cook Political Report then rated it as 'Republican Toss Up'.

Source	Ranking	As of
The Cook Political Report	Tossup	November 6, 2008
Rothenberg	Tilt D (flip)	November 2, 2008
Sabato's Crystal Ball	Lean D (flip)	November 6, 2008
Real Clear Politics	Tossup	November 7, 2008
CQ Politics	Tossup	November 6, 2008

==== Results ====
Despite the controversy, Bachmann was re-elected, garnering 46.4% of the vote to Tinklenberg's 43.4% and Anderson's 10%.

Minnesota's 6th congressional district election, 2008
Party	Candidate	Votes	%
Republican	Michele Bachmann (incumbent)	187,817	46.4
Democratic (DFL)	Elwyn Tinklenberg	175,786	43.4
Independence	Bob Anderson	40,643	10.0
Write-in		479	0.1
Total votes		404,725	100.0
Republican hold			

==== Finances ====
===== Campaigns =====
Candidate (party)	Raised	Spent	Cash on hand
Michele Bachmann (R)	$3,494,045	$3,565,248	$1,918
Elwyn Tinklenberg (DFL)	$2,968,319	$2,515,420	$452,898
Bob Anderson (I)	Unreported		

===== Outside Spending =====
Candidate (party)	Supported	Opposed
Michele Bachmann (R)	$189,713	$25,148
Elwyn Tinklenberg (DFL)	$172,872	$0
Bob Anderson (I)	$0	$0

== District 7 ==
2008 Minnesota's 7th congressional district election
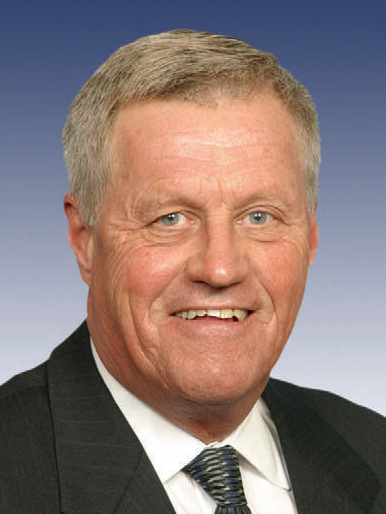

Nominee	Collin Peterson	Glen Menze
Party	Democratic (DFL)	Republican
Popular vote	227,187	87,062
Percentage	72.2%	27.7%
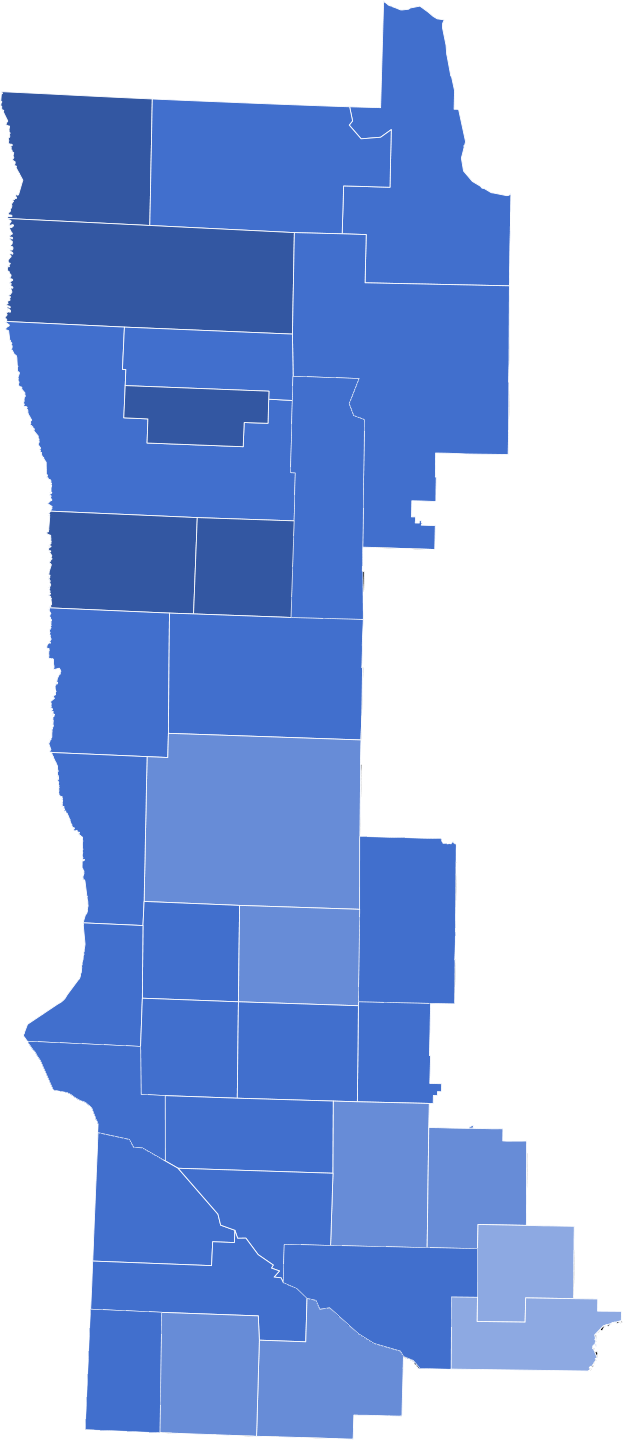
- Peterson: 50–60% 60–70% 70–80% 80–90% Peterson: 50–60% 60–70% 70–80% 80–90% >90% Menze: 50–60% 60–70% No votes
U.S. Representative before election
Collin Peterson
Democratic (DFL)
Elected U.S. Representative
Collin Peterson
Democratic (DFL)

This district covers almost all of the western side of Minnesota from the Canada–US border down to Lincoln County, and is the largest district in the state. Incumbent Democrat Collin Peterson, who had represented the district since 1991, ran for re-election. He was re-elected with 69.7% of the vote in 2006, and the district had a PVI of R+6.

=== Democratic primary ===
As chair of the House Agriculture Committee, 9-term DFLer Collin Peterson is at home in this mostly-agricultural district. Although the district leans Republican, Peterson's social conservatism and farmer/labor DFL values served him well in his district.

==== Candidates ====
===== Nominee =====
- Collin Peterson, incumbent U.S. representative

==== Results ====
Democratic primary election
Party	Candidate	Votes	%
Democratic (DFL)	Collin C. Peterson (incumbent)	21,791	100.0
Total votes		21,791	100.0

=== Republican primary ===
==== Candidates ====
===== Nominee =====
- Glen Menze, accountant and nominee for this seat in 2000

===== Eliminated in primary =====
- Alan Roebke, farmer and convicted felon

==== Results ====
Republican primary election
Party	Candidate	Votes	%
Republican	Glen Menze	7,698	51.8
Republican	Alan Roebke	7,172	48.2
Total votes		14,870	100.0

=== General election ===
==== Endorsements ====
Collin Peterson (DFL)

Labor unions

- AFL-CIO

Organizations

- Blue Dog Coalition
- NRA Political Victory Fund

==== Predictions ====
Source	Ranking	As of
The Cook Political Report	Safe D	November 6, 2008
Rothenberg	Safe D	November 2, 2008
Sabato's Crystal Ball	Safe D	November 6, 2008
Real Clear Politics	Safe D	November 7, 2008
CQ Politics	Safe D	November 6, 2008

==== Results ====
Minnesota's 7th congressional district election, 2008
Party	Candidate	Votes	%
Democratic (DFL)	Collin Peterson (incumbent)	227,187	72.2
Republican	Glen Menze	87,062	27.7
Write-in		431	0.1
Total votes		314,680	100.0
Democratic (DFL) hold			

==== Finances ====
===== Campaigns =====
Candidate (party)	Raised	Spent	Cash on hand
Collin Peterson (DFL)	$1,218,264	$1,036,463	$497,343
Glen Menze (R)	$12,875	$13,401	$0

===== Outside Spending =====
Candidate (party)	Supported	Opposed
Collin Peterson (DFL)	$4,077	$0
Glen Menze (R)	$3,989	$0

== District 8 ==
2008 Minnesota's 8th congressional district election
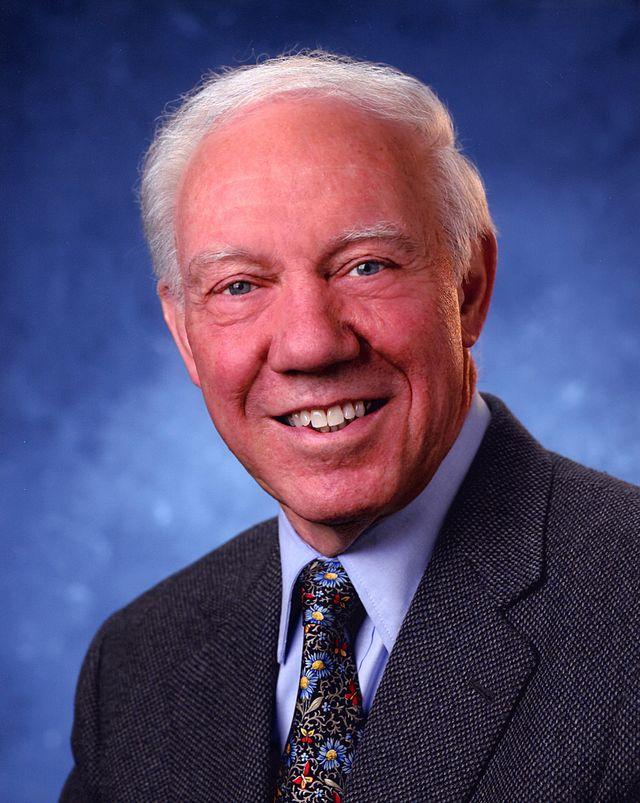

Nominee	Jim Oberstar	Michael Cummins
Party	Democratic (DFL)	Republican
Popular vote	241,831	114,871
Percentage	67.7%	32.2%
- Precinct results Oberstar: 50–60% 60–70% 70–80% 80–90% >90% Cummins: 50–60% 60–70% 70–80% 80–90% Tie: 50% No votes
U.S. Representative before election
Jim Oberstar
Democratic (DFL)
Elected U.S. Representative
Jim Oberstar
Democratic (DFL)

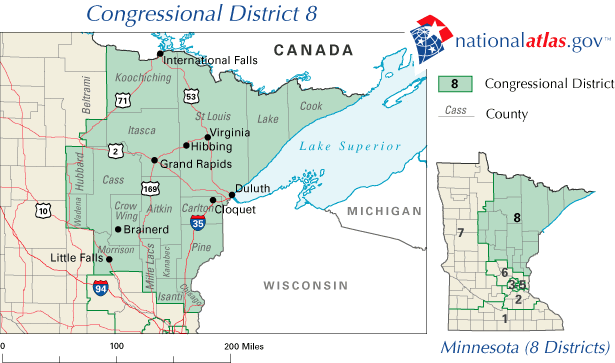

This district covers the northeastern part of Minnesota and includes Duluth, Hibbing, and the Mesabi Range. Incumbent Democrat Jim Oberstar, who had represented the district since 1975, ran for re-election. He was re-elected with 63.6% of the vote in 2006, and the district had a PVI of D+4.

=== Democratic primary ===
Seventeen-term veteran DFLer, Jim Oberstar was Minnesota's senior representative. In 2006, former Republican U.S. Senator Rod Grams challenged Oberstar, garnering 34% of the vote. In 2008, 74-year-old Oberstar maintained his popularity among his constituency. The district leaned Democratic owing to the loyalty of miners, loggers, and farmers to the DFL.

On May 3, 2008, the 8th District DFL endorsed Oberstar for another term.

==== Candidates ====
===== Nominee =====
- Jim Oberstar, incumbent U.S. representative

=== Republican primary ===
==== Candidates ====
===== Nominee =====
- Michael Cummins, small business owner

=== General election ===
==== Endorsements ====
Jim Oberstar (DFL)

Labor unions

- AFL-CIO

Organizations

- Citizens for Global Solutions
- NRA Political Victory Fund
Michael Cummins (R)

Organizations

- Republican Liberty Caucus

==== Predictions ====
Source	Ranking	As of
The Cook Political Report	Safe D	November 6, 2008
Rothenberg	Safe D	November 2, 2008
Sabato's Crystal Ball	Safe D	November 6, 2008
Real Clear Politics	Safe D	November 7, 2008
CQ Politics	Safe D	November 6, 2008

==== Results ====
Minnesota's 8th congressional district election, 2008
Party	Candidate	Votes	%
Democratic (DFL)	Jim Oberstar (incumbent)	241,831	67.7
Republican	Michael Cummins	114,871	32.2
Write-in		582	0.2
Total votes		357,284	100.0
Democratic (DFL) hold			

==== Finances ====
===== Campaigns =====
Candidate (party)	Raised	Spent	Cash on hand
Jim Oberstar (DFL)	$1,995,753	$1,409,685	$758,117
Michael Cummins (R)	$23,431	$15,751	$1,436

===== Outside Spending =====
Candidate (party)	Supported	Opposed
Jim Oberstar (DFL)	$2,407	$0
Michael Cummins (R)	$620	$0

== See also ==
- 2008 United States House of Representatives elections
- 2008 United States presidential election in Minnesota
- 2008 United States Senate election in Minnesota
- 2008 Minnesota House of Representatives election
