= Trabue =

Trabue is a name, possibly derived from tribus an Old French word for "tribe". It may refer to the following:

== Name ==
=== Surname ===
- Charles Clay Trabue (1798–1851), American politician, bankers and a former mayor of Nashville, Tennessee
- Daniel Trabue, first settler of Columbia, Kentucky
- Isaac Trabue, lawyer and attempted namesake of Punta Gorda, Florida
- Colonel Robert P. Trabue, of the American Confederate Army
- Russell Trabue (1900–1988), American baseball pitcher in the Negro league

=== Middle name ===
- William Trabue Major (1790–1867), American religious leader
- Margaret Trabue Hodgen (1890–1977), American sociologist and author

== Other uses ==
- Daniel Trabue House, Columbia, Kentucky
