= Bonoff =

Bonoff is a surname. Notable people with the surname include:

- Karla Bonoff (born 1951), American singer-songwriter
- Terri Bonoff (born 1957), American politician
