= Hawlings River =

Tributary of the Patuxent River in Maryland, United States

Coordinates: 39.175940°N 77.005533°W

Hawlings River is a 12.9-mile-long (20.8 km) tributary of the Patuxent River in Montgomery County, Maryland. The watershed covers an area of about 28 square miles (73 km^{2}). The waterway was originally called Holland's River. The headwaters of the river originate in the area north of Laytonsville, and the river flows southeast, entering the Patuxent about 1.5 miles (2.4 km) below the Triadelphia Reservoir. Portions of Hawlings River flow through Rachel Carson Conservation Park and Hawlings River Stream Valley Park. Tributaries of the Hawlings River include Mount Zion Tributary, Reddy Branch, Olney Mill Tributary, Gregg Tributary, and James Creek. The river and its tributaries total about 98 miles (158 km) of streams.

Before 1769 local residents petitioned the colonial government to build a chapel on the river.

== See also ==
- List of rivers of Maryland
