= Pleasant Fields =

Coordinates: 39°13′15″N 77°05′36″W

- Interactive map of the Pleasant Fields area
- Alternative names: Henry Chew Gaither House

General information
- Location: 4615 Sundown Road, Laytonsville, Maryland

Pleasant Fields is an historic home in Laytonsville, Montgomery County, Maryland. It is also known as the Henry Chew Gaither House.

Maryland politicians William Lingan Gaither and Henry Chew Gaither both lived here and are buried on the grounds.

The house has a sister house in the vicinity, built by the same builder, Ephraim Gaither. Clover Hill (Brookeville, Maryland)
