= Minnesota Forward =

Political action group

Minnesota Forward (or MN Forward) is a political action group funded by local corporations. They were "established to ensure that private-sector job creation and economic growth are at the top of the agenda during the 2010 campaign" Their mission statement says that "MN Forward is an effort by Minnesota job providers to elect a governor and state legislators who understand the importance of creating private-sector jobs and economic opportunity in our state."

As of late summer 2010, MN Forward was supporting a ticket consisting of Tom Emmer for governor, Terri Bonoff, Doug Magnus, and Jim Metzen for State Senate, and Gene Pelowski, Doug Wardlow, and Kurt Zellers for the State House. However, the PAC, which took in $1.9 million in contributions, dedicated 97% of its expenditures towards supporting Emmer and defeating Democratic gubernatorial nominee Mark Dayton.

== Criticism over donations ==
In July 2010, Target Corporation and Best Buy, among others, gave $150,000 and $100,000 respectively to Minnesota Forward. The funds were then spent on campaign ads for Tom Emmer, which provoked criticism by Human Rights Campaign, due to his positions on LGBT rights.
