= Gaither, Missouri =

Extinct town in Missouri, USA

Coordinates: 37.1531106°N 93.8849318°W

Gaither is an extinct town in Lawrence County, in the U.S. state of Missouri.

A post office called Gaither was established in 1901, and remained in operation until 1907. The community was named after Ephraim Gaither, an early settler.
