= Nathan Gaither =

American politician (1788–1862)

Member of the Kentucky House of Representatives from Adair County
- In office August 6, 1855 – August 3, 1857
- Preceded by: Timoleon Cravens
- Succeeded by: William E. Russell

Member of the U.S. House of Representatives from Kentucky's 8th district
- In office March 4, 1829 – March 3, 1833
- Preceded by: Richard A. Buckner
- Succeeded by: Patrick H. Pope

Member of the Kentucky House of Representatives
- In office 1815–1818

Personal details
- Born: September 15, 1788 near Mocksville, North Carolina, U.S.
- Died: August 12, 1862 (aged 73) Columbia, Kentucky, U.S.
- Resting place: Columbia Cemetery, Columbia, Kentucky, U.S.
- Party: Jacksonian
- Education: Bardstown College; Jefferson Medical College
- Profession: Politician, physician

Military service
- Allegiance: United States
- Battles/wars: War of 1812

Nathan Gaither (September 15, 1788 – August 12, 1862) was a U.S. representative from Kentucky.

Born near Mocksville, North Carolina, Gaither completed preparatory studies. He attended Bardstown College. He studied medicine. He graduated from Jefferson Medical College and began practice in Columbia, Kentucky. He served as assistant surgeon in the War of 1812. He served as member of the State house of representatives 1815–1818.

Gaither was elected as a Jacksonian to the Twenty-first and Twenty-second Congresses (March 4, 1829 – March 3, 1833). He was an unsuccessful candidate for reelection 1832 to the Twenty-third Congress. He served as delegate to the State constitutional convention in 1849. He was again a member of the State house of representatives 1855–1857. He resumed the practice of medicine. He died in Columbia, Kentucky, August 12, 1862. He was interred in Columbia Cemetery.

The Dr. Nathan Gaither House, at 100 S. High St. in Columbia, was listed on the National Register of Historic Places in 1979.

U.S. House of Representatives
| Preceded by Richard A. Buckner | Member of the U.S. House of Representatives from Kentucky's 8th congressional district 1829 – 1833 | Succeeded by Patrick H. Pope |
