= Laytonsville, Maryland =

- Town
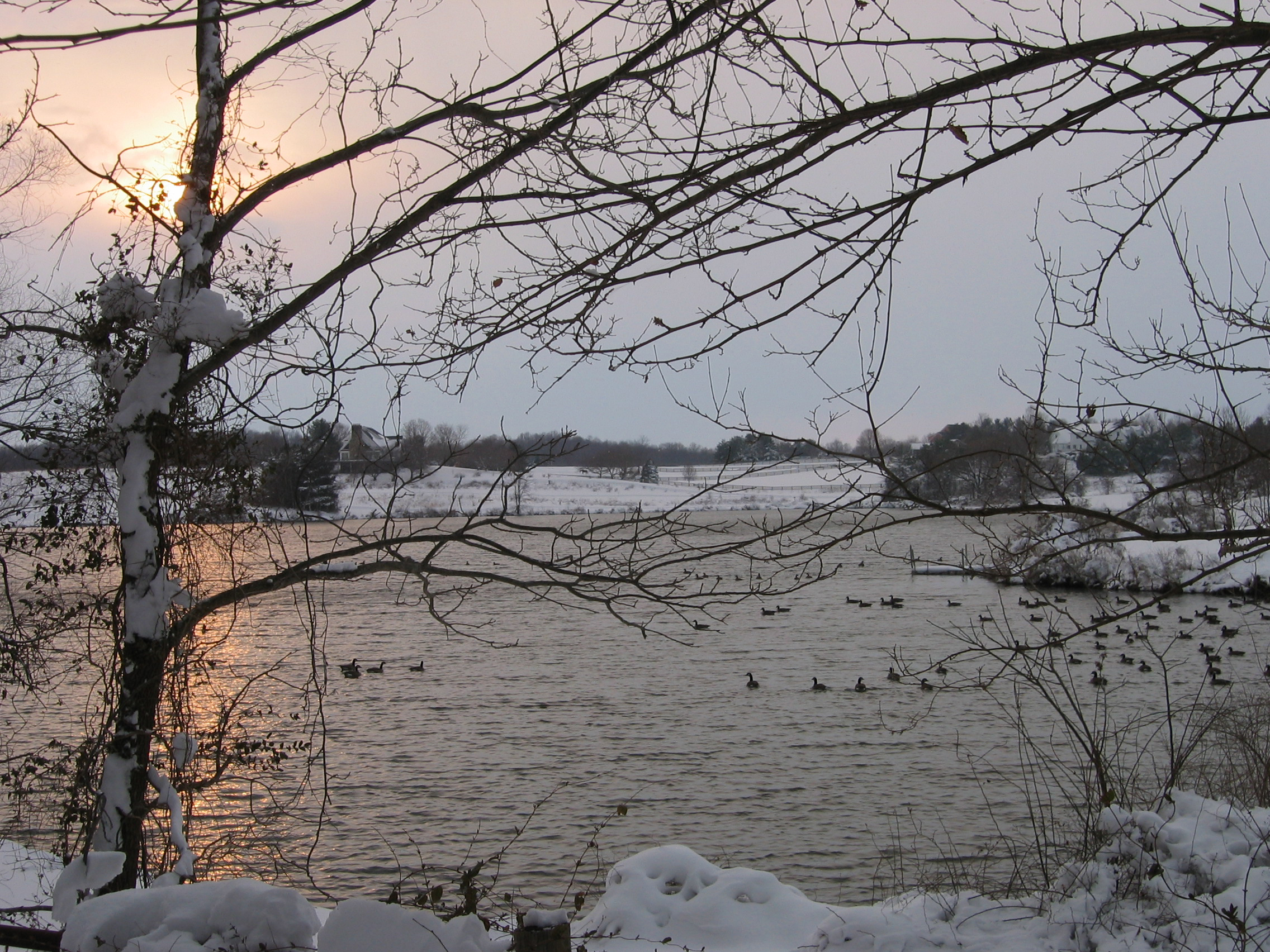
- The Rachel Carson Greenway in February 2006

- Flag Logo

- Location of Laytonsville in Montgomery County and Maryland
- Coordinates: 39°12′41″N 77°8′24″W
- Country: United States
- State: Maryland
- County: Montgomery
- Incorporated: 1892

Government
  - Mayor: Charles Hendricks
  - Town Council: Charles Bradsher, Tom Burke, Amy Koval, Christina Pellegrino

Area
  - Total: 1.05 sq mi (2.72 km^{2})
  - Land: 1.05 sq mi (2.71 km^{2})
  - Water: 0.0039 sq mi (0.01 km^{2})
- Elevation: 614 ft (187 m)

Population (2020)
  - Total: 572
  - Density: 546.5/sq mi (211.02/km^{2})
- Time zone: UTC-5 (Eastern (EST))
  - Summer (DST): UTC-4 (EDT)
- ZIP code: 20882
- Area codes: 301, 240
- FIPS code: 24-46250
- GNIS feature ID: 0585383
- Website: tol.wildapricot.org

Laytonsville is a town in Montgomery County, Maryland, United States. The population was 572 at the 2020 census, up from 353 in 2010. Laytonsville was incorporated in 1892.

== History ==
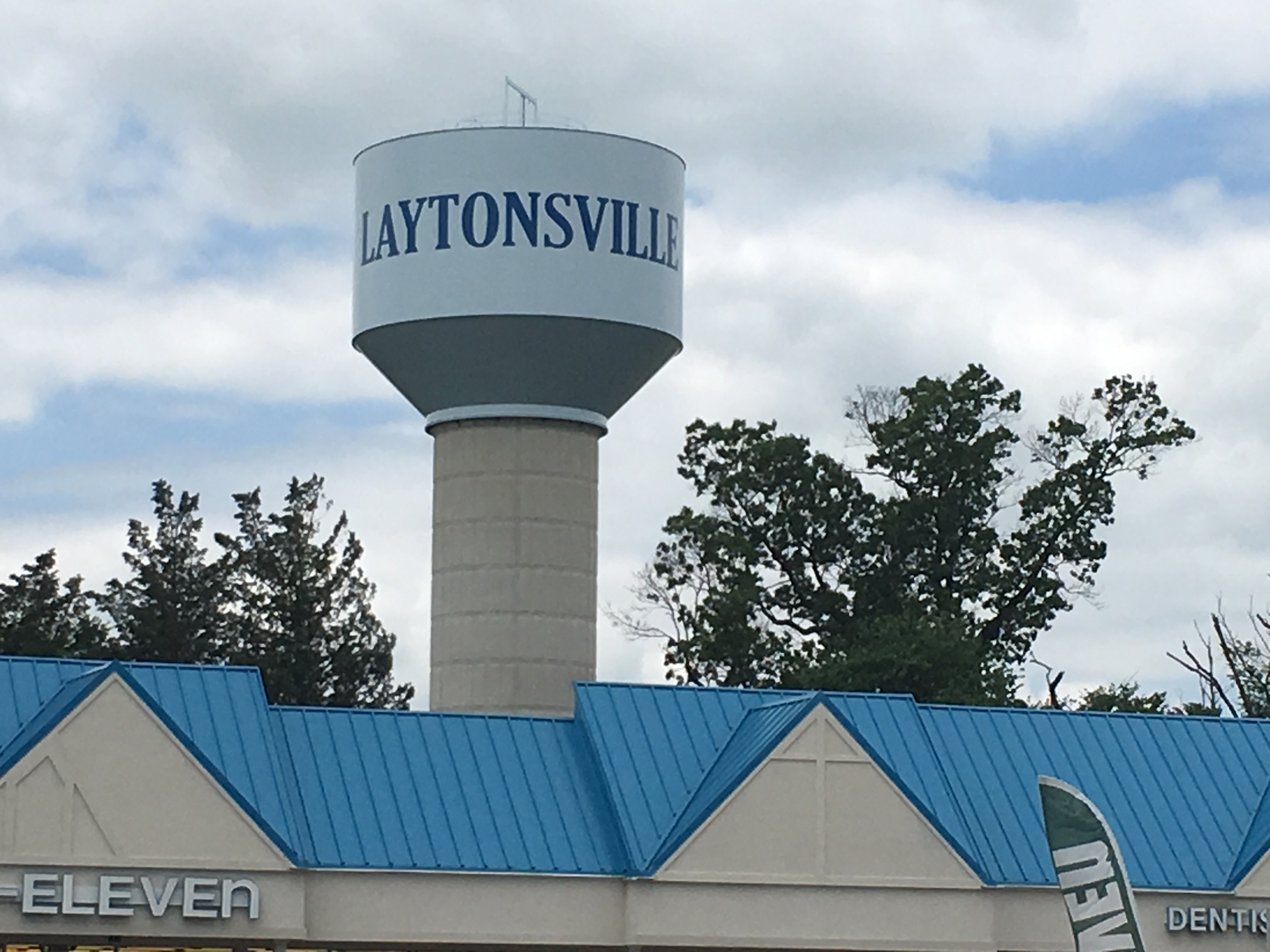
Laytonsville water tower

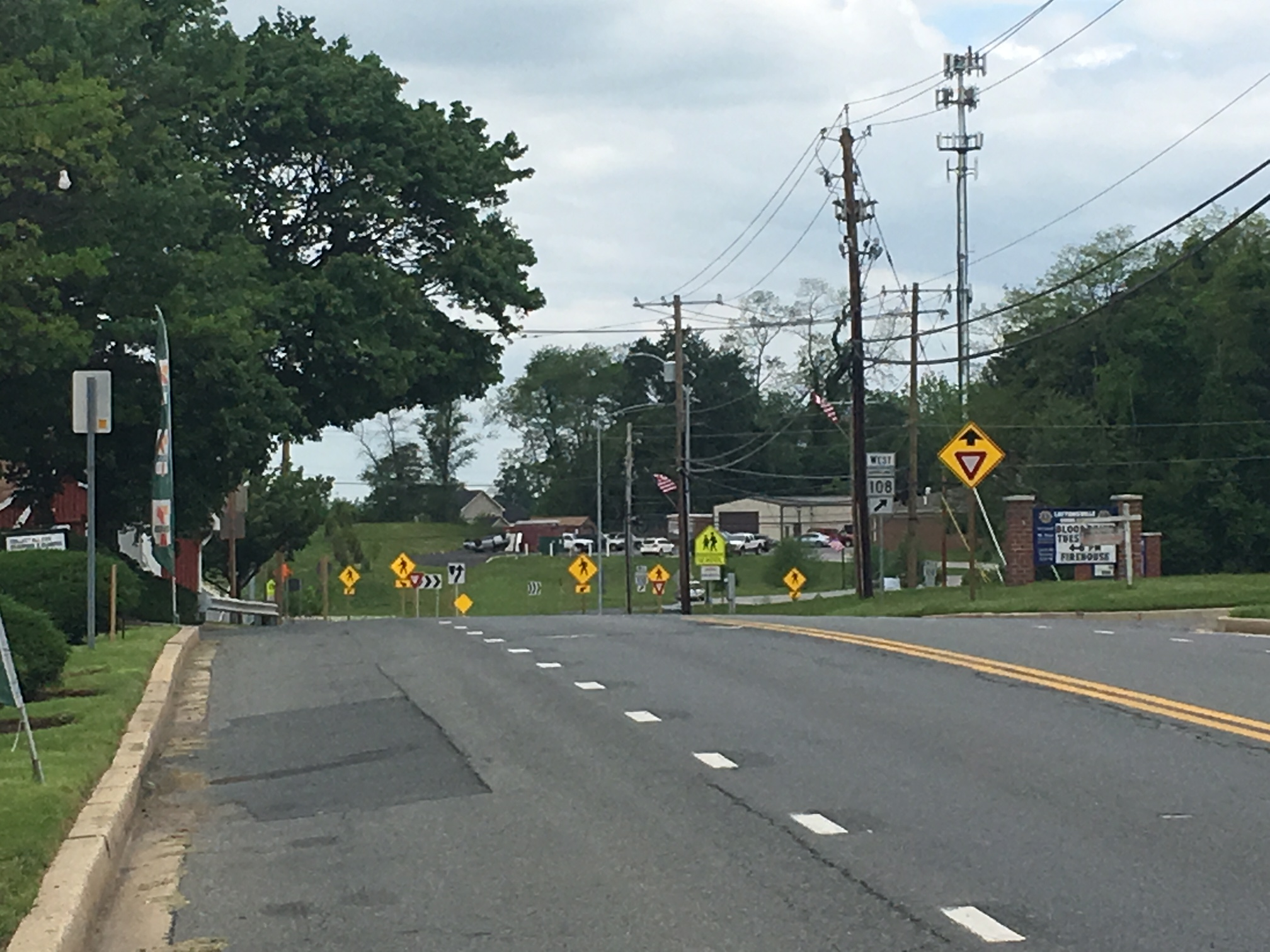
Route 108 in Laytonsville

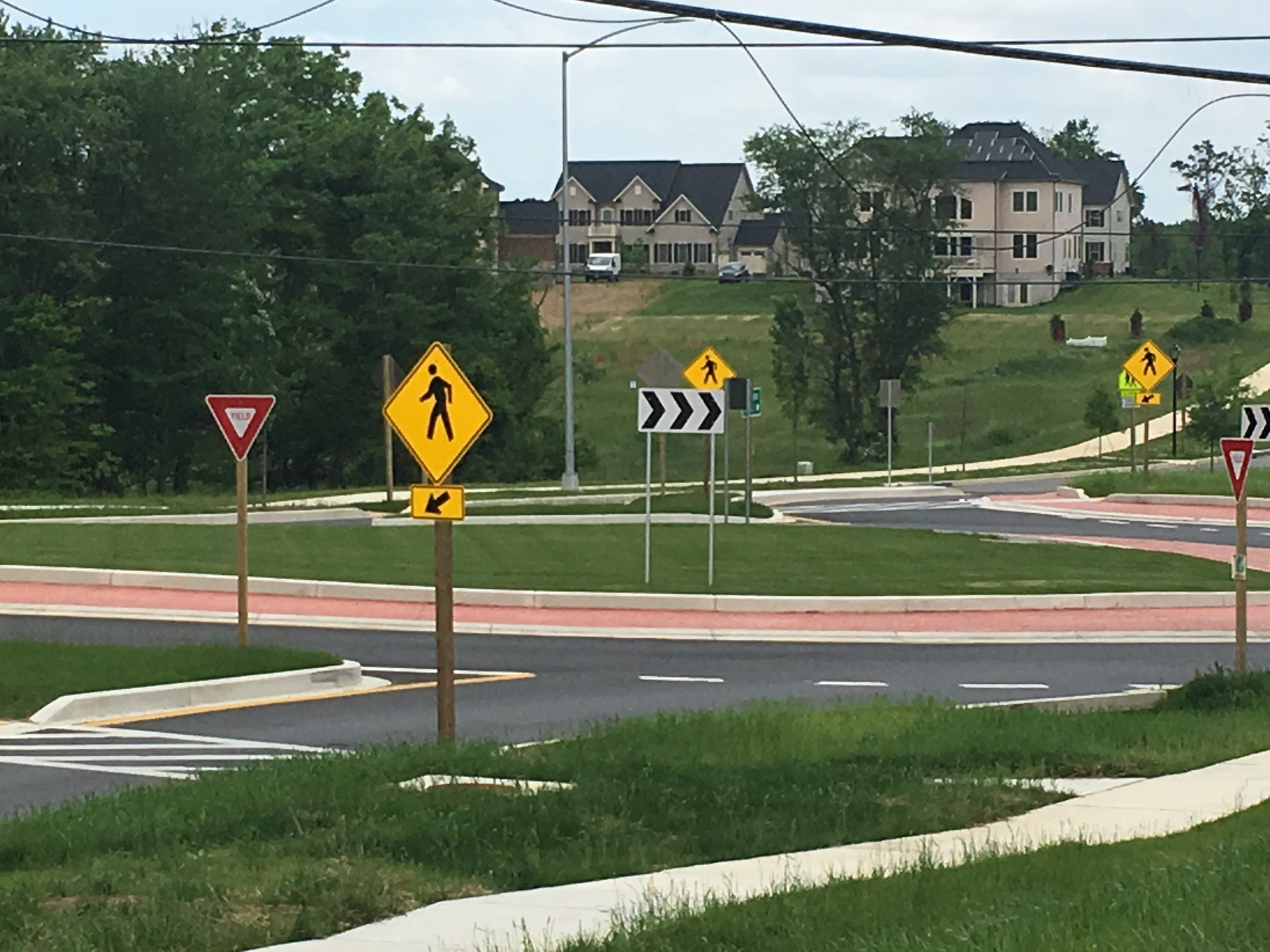
Traffic circle in Laytonsville

Laytonsville was originally known as "Cracklintown". This name originated from the popular cracklin bread, which was baked in the locale. This recipe, essentially a bacon cornbread, also lent the entire area the name of Cracklin District. The original town extended beyond Laytonsville's current boundaries, along Sundown Road toward the Hawlings River. The earliest church, school, and store were in this area. The first major road through Cracklintown was built in the early 1800s. This was the Brink-Sundown Road, referred to in documents from the early 1800s as the "road from the mouth of the Monocacy to Ellicotts Mills."

The road which would become Route 108 appears in the historical record to have been added in the very early 1800s. This crossroads provided a major artery for cattle and pigs headed for the bustling markets of Baltimore to the east, and established the town as a comfortable stopover for the drovers. By the early nineteenth century, substantial brick buildings were being constructed, such as the Layton House and a tavern across the road. By 1850, the southeast corner of the crossroads was developed. Much of the rest of the town along Route 108 was not developed until the 1870s.

A second reason for the development of the town was the successful farming in the area. Laytonsville farmers were blessed by the quality of the soil, a Manor loam or Chester loam, very fertile and well drained, but a soil which does not dry out too quickly. Under the loam lies a subsoil of red clay which assists in holding the moisture for roots even during hot, dry summers.

Laytonsville was incorporated in 1892.

== Geography ==
Laytonsville is located in northern Montgomery County 10 miles (16 km) north of Rockville, the county seat, 24 miles (39 km) north of Washington, D.C., and the same distance southeast of Frederick.

According to the United States Census Bureau, the town has a total area of 1.05 square miles (2.72 km^{2}), of which 0.004 square miles (0.010 km^{2}), or 0.38%, are water. The town sits on a low ridge which drains west to the Goshen Branch, a tributary of Seneca Creek and part of the Potomac River watershed, and east toward the Hawlings River, a tributary of the Patuxent River.

The town has more of a small town, rural character than nearby Olney. There are a number of tracts of farmland on the outskirts, as well as numerous homes on large plots of land.

== Demographics ==
Historical population
Census	Pop.	Note	%±
1900	148		—
1910	133		−10.1%
1920	133		0.0%
1930	146		9.8%
1940	127		−13.0%
1950	132		3.9%
1960	196		48.5%
1970	293		49.5%
1980	195		−33.4%
1990	248		27.2%
2000	277		11.7%
2010	353		27.4%
2020	572		62.0%
U.S. Decennial Census

The median income for a household in the town was $75,000, and the median income for a family was $83,261. Males had a median income of $57,500 versus $38,750 for females. The per capita income for the town was $30,681. None of the families and 0.7% of the population were living below the poverty line.

=== 2010 census ===
As of the census of 2010, there were 353 people, 127 households, and 98 families living in the town. The population density was 339.4 inhabitants per square mile (131.0/km^{2}). There were 133 housing units at an average density of 127.9 per square mile (49.4/km^{2}). The racial makeup of the town was 83.0% White, 6.8% African American, 7.4% Asian, and 2.8% from two or more races. Hispanic or Latino of any race were 1.1% of the population.

There were 127 households, of which 39.4% had children under the age of 18 living with them, 67.7% were married couples living together, 7.1% had a female householder with no husband present, 2.4% had a male householder with no wife present, and 22.8% were non-families. 17.3% of all households were made up of individuals, and 1.6% had someone living alone who was 65 years of age or older. The average household size was 2.78 and the average family size was 3.19.

The median age in the town was 42.9 years. 23.8% of residents were under the age of 18; 4.7% were between the ages of 18 and 24; 23.8% were from 25 to 44; 38.5% were from 45 to 64; and 9.1% were 65 years of age or older. The gender makeup of the town was 51.0% male and 49.0% female.

=== 2000 census ===
As of the census of 2000, there were 277 people, 103 households, and 77 families living in the town. The population density was 282.4 inhabitants per square mile (109.0/km^{2}). There were 107 housing units at an average density of 109.1 per square mile (42.1/km^{2}). The racial makeup of the town was 97.70% White, 0.86% African American and 1.44% Asian. Hispanic or Latino of any race were 1.81% of the population.

There were 103 households, out of which 39.8% had children under the age of 18 living with them, 64.1% were married couples living together, 5.8% had a female householder with no husband present, and 25.2% were non-families. 22.3% of all households were made up of individuals, and 4.9% had someone living alone who was 65 years of age or older. The average household size was 2.69 and the average family size was 3.17.

In the town, the population was spread out, with 26.4% under the age of 18, 7.2% from 18 to 24, 27.4% from 25 to 44, 28.9% from 45 to 64, and 10.1% who were 65 years of age or older. The median age was 39 years. For every 100 females, there were 93.7 males. For every 100 females age 18 and over, there were 98.1 males.

== Education ==
Laytonsville is served by the Montgomery County Public Schools.

Schools that serve Laytonsville include:

- Laytonsville Elementary School
- Gaithersburg Middle School
- Gaithersburg High School

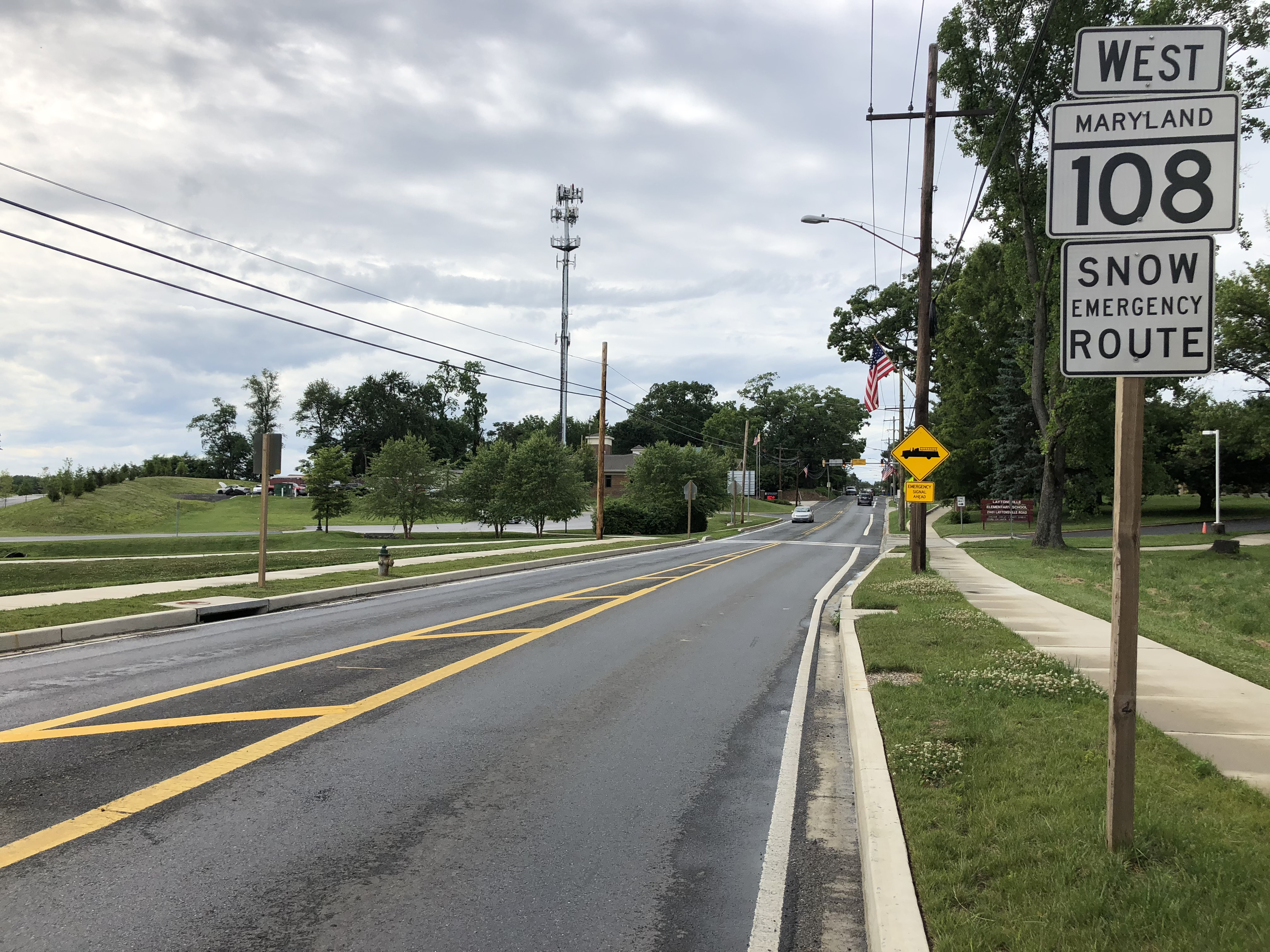
MD 108 westbound in Laytonsville

== Transportation ==
The only state highway serving Laytonsville is Maryland Route 108. MD 108 follows a generally east–west course along a roughly S-shaped route, connecting Maryland Route 27 at Damascus with Maryland Route 175 in eastern Columbia. The most prominent highway MD 108 connects to is U.S. Route 29 in Columbia, though it also links to Maryland Route 97 and Maryland Route 650; all three highways head towards Washington, D.C.

== See also ==
- Pleasant Fields
