= Zion Meetinghouse and School =

Historic church in Kentucky, United States

- U.S. National Register of Historic Places
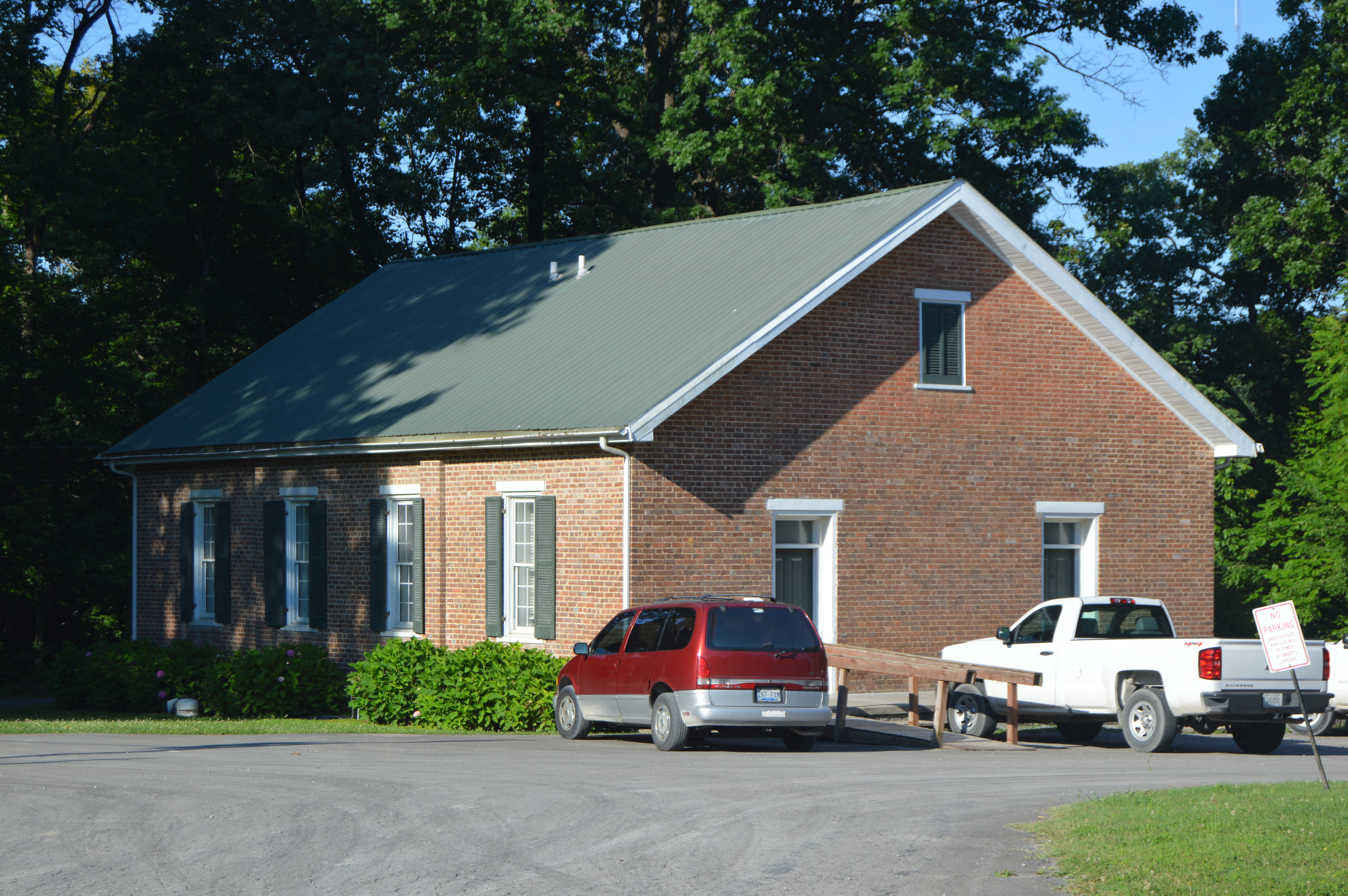
- Southern side and front of the church

- Location within Kentucky Location within the United States
- Nearest city: Columbia, Kentucky
- Coordinates: 37°3′2″N 85°15′44″W
- Area: 10 acres (4.0 ha)
- Built: 1837
- Architect: James and Thomas Holloday
- NRHP reference No.: 76000843
- Added to NRHP: May 13, 1976

Zion Meetinghouse and School (also known as Zion Baptist Church and School) is a historic Baptist church about three miles south of Columbia, Kentucky. The congregation was formed in 1802 and a log meetinghouse was soon constructed. The current meetinghouse was built in 1837 out of locally made brick laid in Flemish bond on a stone foundation. After a fire, the building was reconstructed above the roofline in 1877. About 100 feet west of the meetinghouse, a two-story brick school was built in 1864, with a later frame addition at the entrance. The school was later used by the public school system.

In 1827 the Zion Baptist Church served as the "mother church" or sponsoring congregation for the nearby Columbia Baptist Church. Over time, many members of the rural Zion congregation moved to the daughter church in the town of Columbia. By 1975, the Zion church was "seldom used," with the buildings in "somewhat deteriorating condition but in an unspoiled setting."

The meetinghouse and the school were added together to the National Register of Historic Places in 1976.
