= Henry Chew Gaither =

American politician

Henry Chew Gaither, born January 25, 1778, to William Gaither I and Elizabeth Howard Davis served in Maryland House of Delegates from 1808 to 1810. He married Eliza Worthington and had only one child, William Lingan Gaither who served as Montgomery County's representative in the Maryland House of Delegates from 1839 to 1841.

He died February 12, 1845, and is buried with his wife at Pleasant Fields, his ancestral home.
