= Gaither House (Morganton, North Carolina) =

Historic house in North Carolina, United States

- U.S. National Register of Historic Places
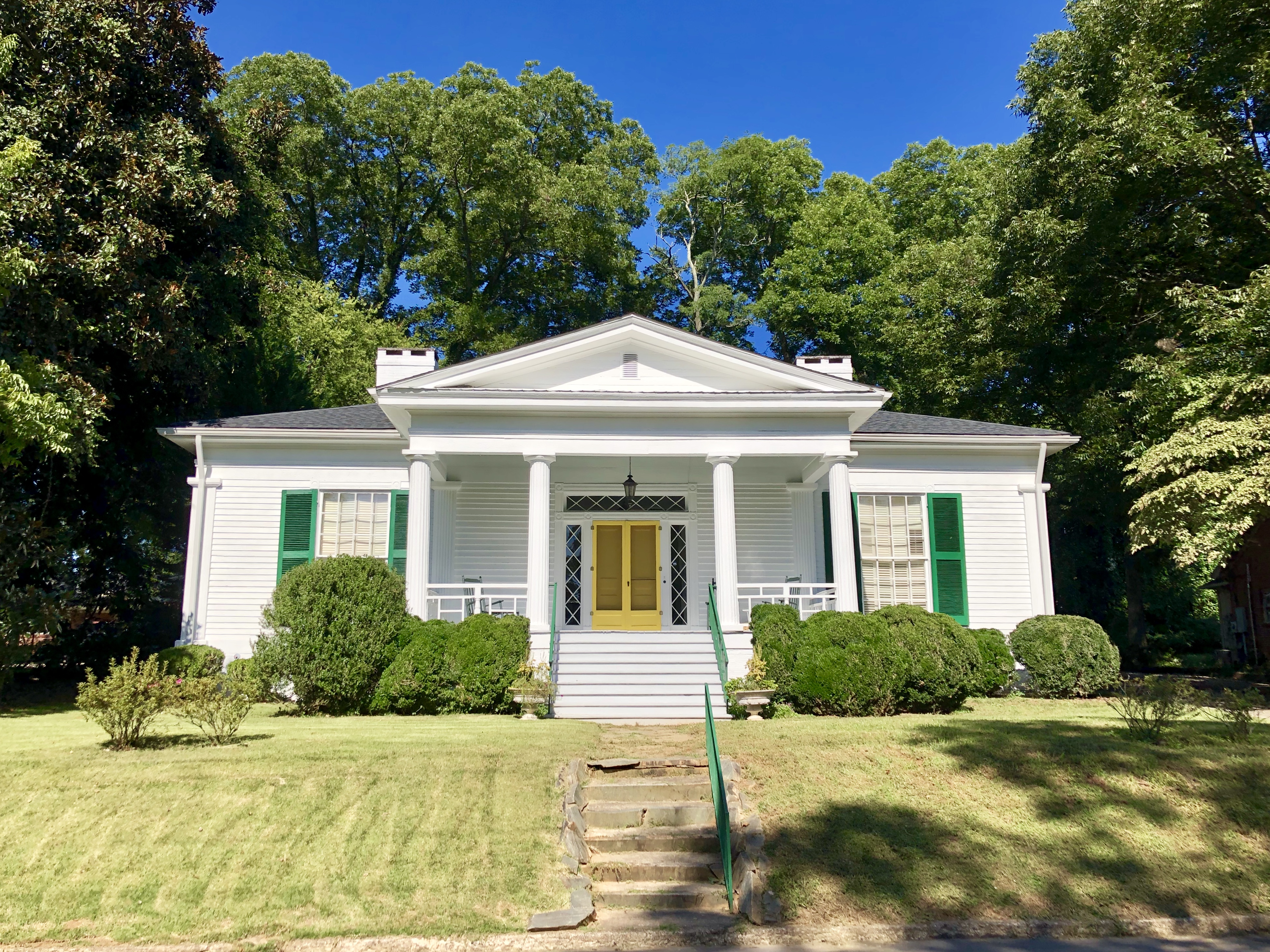
- Gaither House, August 2019

- Location within North Carolina Location within the United States
- Location: 102 N. Anderson St., Morganton, North Carolina
- Coordinates: 35°44′29″N 81°41′33″W
- Area: 0.5 acres (0.20 ha)
- Built: c. 1840
- Architectural style: Greek Revival
- NRHP reference No.: 76001310
- Added to NRHP: April 23, 1976

Gaither House is a historic home located in Morganton, Burke County, North Carolina. It was built about 1840 and is a one-story, three-bay, hip-roofed, Greek Revival style frame house. It features a three-bay, pedimented entrance porch supported by four large, fluted Doric order columns. It was the home of Burgess Sidney Gaither (1807-1892), a Whig party attorney long prominent in local and state political activities.

It was listed on the National Register of Historic Places in 1976.
