= Dr. Nathan Gaither House =

- U.S. National Register of Historic Places
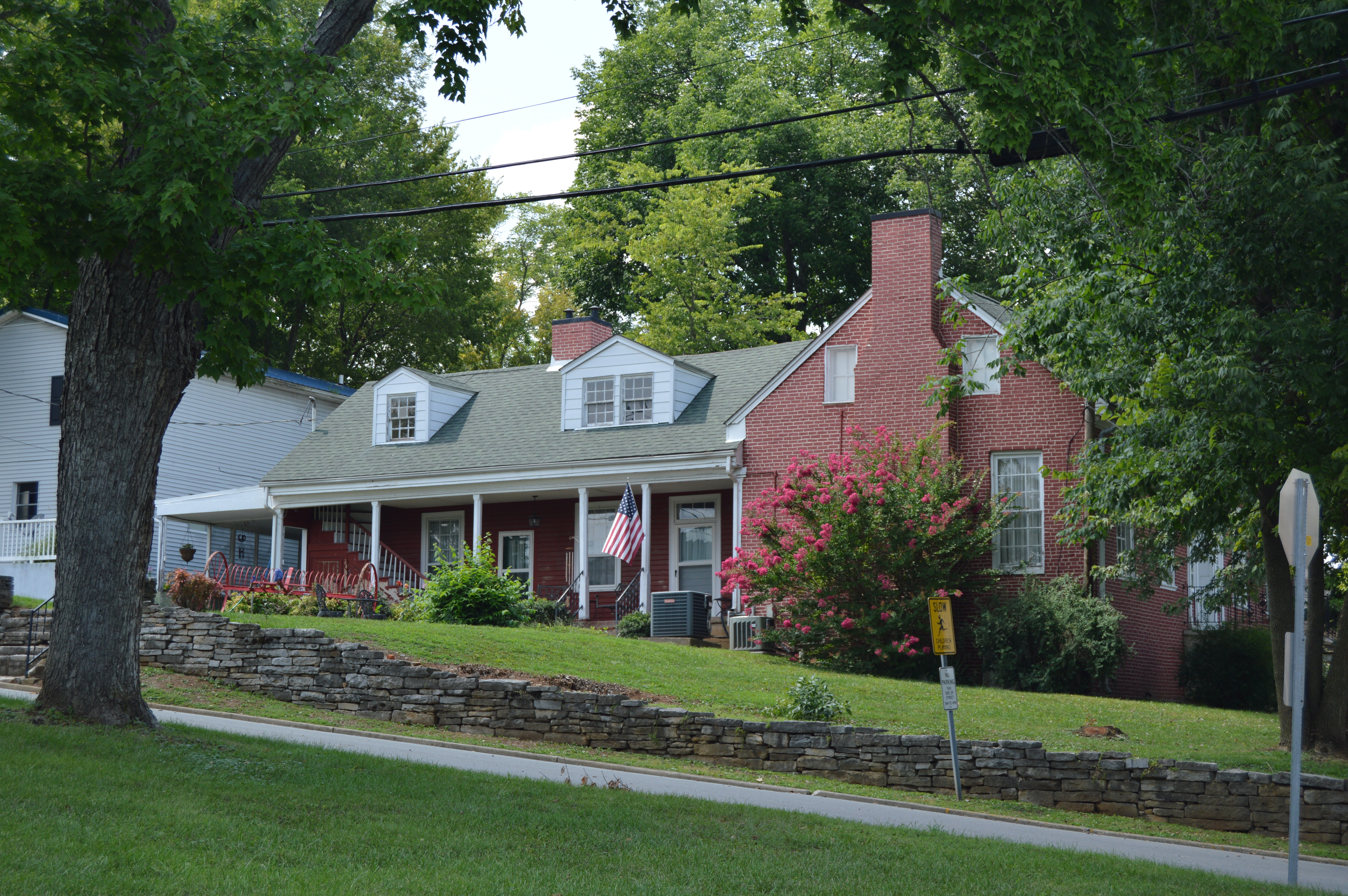

- Location within Kentucky Location within the United States
- Location: 100 S. High St., Columbia, Kentucky
- Coordinates: 37°06′15″N 85°18′28″W
- Area: less than one acre
- Built: 1814
- Architectural style: Federal
- NRHP reference No.: 79000956
- Added to NRHP: March 21, 1979

The Dr. Nathan Gaither House, at 100 S. High St. in Columbia, Kentucky was listed on the National Register of Historic Places in 1979.

It was a home of Dr. Nathan Gaither (1788–1862), who became a doctor and volunteered to receive the smallpox vaccination under development by Edward Jenner. Gaither served as a surgeon in the War of 1812 and settled in Columbia by the end of that war. He served as a doctor and in politics: as an elected member of the Kentucky legislature from 1815 to 1818, and in the United States House of Representatives from 1829 to 1833.
