= William S. Gaither =

American academic administrator (1932–2009)

William S. Gaither (December 3, 1932 – September 11, 2009) was an American civil engineer and academic administrator best known for serving as president of Drexel University from 1984 to 1987.

== Academic background ==
Gaither was born on a farm in Indiana during the Great Depression.

Gaither studied civil engineering at the Rose Polytechnic Institute (now the Rose-Hulman Institute of Technology), graduating in 1956. Before continuing with his graduate education he worked for the Meyer Corporation, the Dravo Corporation, and the Bechtel Corporation as an engineer. After several years with Meyer, Dravo and Bechtel, he undertook graduate study at Princeton University, completing an M.S., an M.A. and a Ph.D. in civil engineering in 1964 with a focus on marine transportation and ocean engineering.

== Career ==
Gaither began his academic career teaching civil engineering at Princeton and later at the University of Florida, where he helped launch one of the United States’ first ocean-engineering curricula. In 1967 he started an ocean engineering program at the University of Delaware. In 1970 he was offered the position of dean and professor of the College of Marine Studies at Delaware, where he was also the Sea Grant program director. This program is an organization which honors colleges that have developed a curriculum for studying the oceans and human impact on them. During his career he frequently testified to Congress on environmental and oceanographic issues.

In May 1984 he left the University of Delaware for the position of President of Drexel University. He was officially he was installed into the position on April 27, 1985. While at Drexel he created eleven new majors and increased alumni giving. He also worked on programs to enhance minority student enrollment at Drexel. During his tenure at Drexel he was on the boards of the University City Science Center, the Pennsylvania-New Jersey-Delaware Council, and the West Philadelphia Partnership.

On April 22, 1987, a Drexel employee filed a sexual harassment complaint against Gaither stating that he had sexually harassed her at a business dinner. Following the incident, faculty vote resulted in a motion of "no confidence" in Gaither. Upon review of the situation and an investigation into other sexual harassment allegations, the Drexel board of trustees overturned the vote of no confidence and did not ask Gaither for his resignation. In October of that year, following continual turmoil on campus due to the incident, Gaither resigned stating that "While I am fully prepared and wish to continue as president of this fine institution, it is my considered judgment that to do so will not serve the best interests of the university."
