= William Lingan Gaither =

American politician (1813 - 1858)

General William Lingan Gaither (February 13, 1813 - August 2, 1858) was born in Locust Grove, Montgomery County, Maryland. He was the only child of Henry Chew Gaither and Eliza Worthington.

Gaither served as Montgomery County's representative in the Maryland House of Delegates from 1839 to 1841. From 1842 until his death, Gaither served on the Maryland Senate and was elected as President of Senate during the 1849 and 1854 sessions.

Gaither was appointed to the Board of Visitors of the U.S. Military Academy in 1851 and served as Director of the Baltimore & Ohio Railroad between 1856 and 1857.

Gaither caught typhoid fever at the Barnum's Hotel in Baltimore, Maryland and died a year later on August 2, 1858, at Berkeley Springs, Virginia. He is buried at his ancestral home of Pleasant Fields in Cracklin, now Laytonsville, Maryland.
