= David Gaither =

American politician

Member of the Minnesota Senate from the 43rd district
- In office January 7, 2003 – September 15, 2005
- Preceded by: Edward C. Oliver
- Succeeded by: Terri Bonoff

Personal details
- Born: March 4, 1957 (age 69) Plymouth, Minnesota
- Party: Republican
- Occupation: marketing, legislator

David C. Gaither (/ˈɡeɪðər/ GAY-dhər; born March 4, 1957) is a former member of the Minnesota Senate who represented District 43, which included portions of Minnetonka, Plymouth and Medicine Lake. A Republican, he was elected in 2002 and served three years before resigning to become Governor Tim Pawlenty's chief of staff.

== Political career ==
Gaither served in the Minnesota Senate from 2003 until 2005. Gaither's endorsements included, Education Minnesota, Minnesota Chamber of Commerce, Twin West Chamber of Commerce, Taxpayer League of Minnesota and was a member of the Commerce, Capital Investment, E-12 Education Finance, Regulated Utilities, Jobs, Energy and Community Development, and Employee Relations committees. In 2005, Gaither resigned from his position as State Senator to assume the role of Chief of Staff under Governor Tim Pawlenty. In 2006, Gaither resigned from his position as Chief of Staff for Governor Pawlenty.

== Electoral history ==
- Minnesota Senate District 43 Election 2002
  - David Gaither (R), 19,537 votes, 54.18%
  - Harold Lerner (D), 12,391 votes, 34.36%
  - Saundra Spigner (I), 4,109 votes, 11.39%
  - Write-in, 24 votes, .07%
