= Burgess Sidney Gaither =

American politician

Burgess Sidney Gaither (March 16, 1807 – February 23, 1892) was a North Carolina politician and attorney who served in the Confederate States Congress during the American Civil War.

== Early life and education ==
Gaither was born in Iredell County, North Carolina, the son of Burgess Gaither (a longtime member of the North Carolina House of Commons) and Milly Martin. B.S. Gaither attended the University of Georgia, where classmates included Alexander Stephens and Robert Toombs.

Admitted to the bar in 1829, Gaither practiced law and served as clerk of court in Burke County. He was also elected to represent the county in the 1835 convention to revise the Constitution of North Carolina.

== Political career ==
A Whig and a supporter of Henry Clay, Gaither was appointed superintendent of the mint at Charlotte in 1841 by President John Tyler.

He was a member of the North Carolina Senate in 1840-41 and again in 1844–45, when he served as President pro tempore. The legislature then elected Gaither to serve as solicitor (district attorney) for the state's seventh judicial district. In 1851 and 1853, he was an unsuccessful candidate for Congress against maverick Whig Thomas L. Clingman. Gaither supported the Constitutional Union Party in the 1860 presidential election but was an advocate of Southern secession after Abraham Lincoln's inauguration.

He represented the state in the First Confederate Congress and the Second Confederate Congress from 1862 to 1865. After the war, Gaither resumed his law practice and ran two more unsuccessful races for Congress. He died in Morganton shortly before what would have been his 85th birthday.

His home known as the Gaither House at Morganton, North Carolina, was listed on the National Register of Historic Places in 1976.
