= Terri Bonoff =

American politician

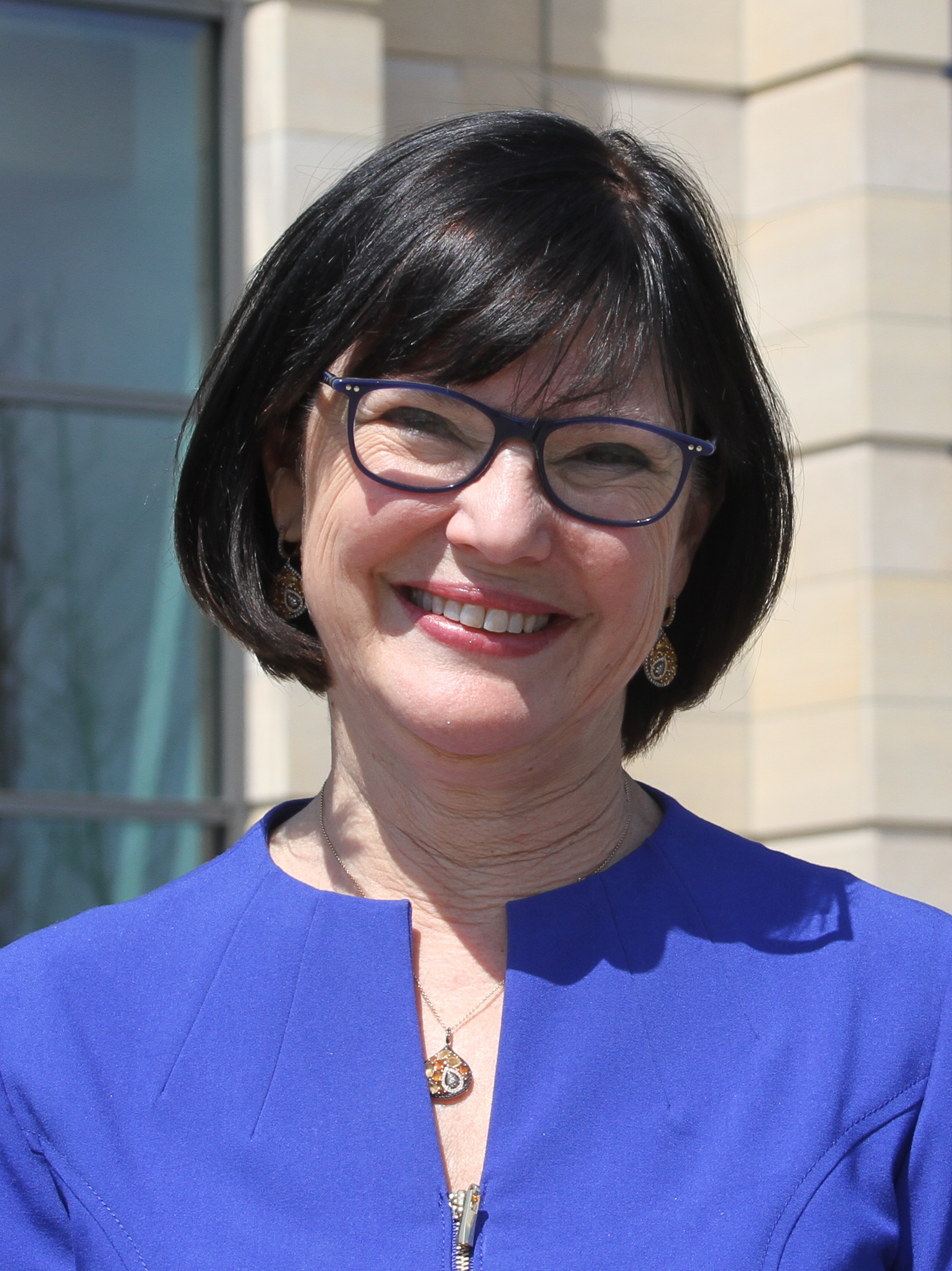

Member of the Minnesota Senate from the 44th district 43rd (2005–2013)
- In office December 7, 2005 – January 2, 2017
- Preceded by: David Gaither
- Succeeded by: Paul Anderson

Personal details
- Born: August 1, 1957 (age 69) Edina, Minnesota, U.S.
- Party: Democratic (DFL)
- Spouse: Matthew Knopf
- Children: 4
- Education: Clark University

Terri E. Bonoff (born August 1, 1957) is an American politician from the U.S. state of Minnesota. She is a former member of the Minnesota Senate, representing District 44, which included portions of Minnetonka, Plymouth and Woodland in Hennepin County in the Twin Cities metropolitan area. A member of the Minnesota Democratic–Farmer–Labor Party (DFL), she was a candidate for the U.S. House of Representatives in Minnesota's 3rd congressional district in 2016. She was defeated by incumbent Republican Erik Paulsen in the general election. She now resides in Atlanta, Georgia and is CEO of Jewish Family & Career Services.

== Early life, education, and career ==
Bonoff grew up in Edina, Minnesota and later attended Clark University in Worcester, Massachusetts, earning a degree in psychology and sociology. She began her business career at Jackson Graves, a family-owned women's specialty store. Bonoff then spent five years in the toy and video game business with Tonka Toys and 13 years as Director of Merchandising for the Computer Products Division of the publicly held, New Hope-based Navarre Corporation. After 18 years in business, Bonoff stepped down from Navarre in 1999 to spend time with her husband and four children.

Before being elected to the Senate, Bonoff was on the Minnetonka Planning Commission and as a volunteer for the Hopkins Legislative Action Commission. She eventually became president of the Hopkins Legislative Action Coalition, a guide at the Minneapolis Institute of Arts, and president of Babe Ruth Baseball in Hopkins/Minnetonka.

== Minnesota Senate ==
Bonoff's career as an elected official began when she won a 2005 special election against Plymouth mayor Judy Johnson to fill the Minnesota Senate seat being vacated by David Gaither. She won a second race against Johnson in the 2006 general election. Bonoff's slogan for all her campaigns has been "Uniting the Middle." She was elected to a second term in 2010 and a third in 2012.

In 2011, Bonoff was elected Deputy Minority Leader of the DFL Senate caucus.

In 2013, Bonoff became the Chair of the Higher Education & Workforce Development Committee. In that capacity, she has overseen an investment of more than $400 million over four years in Minnesota's higher education infrastructure, particularly the Minnesota State Colleges and Universities (MnSCU) and the University of Minnesota. She also created the MN PIPELINE (Private Investment, Public Education Labor Industry Experience) Project, which has received national and international recognition.

On April 16, 2016, Bonoff announced at the Minnesota Senate District 44 Convention that she is leaving the State Legislature to run for U.S. Representative in Minnesota's Third Congressional District.

=== Voting record ===
==== Transportation ====
Bonoff supported the South West Light Rail Train.

==== Health care ====
Bonoff has been a supporter of Minnesotacare, a partnership between private industry and government to provide health care to low-income families and individuals. To be enrolled in MinnesotaCare people must first apply and then pay what they can afford for health insurance. Bonoff has said, "Frankly, I thought our MinnesotaCare program and our subsequent reform efforts to enhance quality while keeping costs down should have been the backbone of the Affordable Care Act" and "Minnesota should establish a health insurance exchange that complies with the minimum requirements under federal law and provides exchange consumers the ability to shop based on provider quality as well as cost." In order to do that Bonoff has said the legislature should "evaluate the cost-effectiveness of new and existing health benefits and eliminate barriers to flexible, innovative insurance products, purchasing and finance options."

==== Education ====
Bonoff voted in favor of alternative teacher licensing (2012 SF 40, SJ 339). After her vote, she explained, "I would never support anything that threatens the integrity of the teaching profession... Alternative licensure is working. Those states -- there are 35 of them -- that have alternative licensure have strong records of the success."

Bonoff also voted in favor of teacher layoff reform (LIFO, 2012 SF 1690 SJ 3968). After that vote she explained, "School districts should use performance and not just seniority when making layoff decisions."

And Bonoff supported paying down the debt owed to school districts with 2012 HF 2083.

==== Taxes ====
- Voted against raising taxes on top earners.
- Voted in favor of the 2007 transportation finance bill, which increased the sales tax by .5%, and amounted to an increase in the gas tax by less than 7.5 cents/gallon (2007 HF 946).
- Voted in favor of the business-supported sales tax from e-retailers with "affiliate nexus" (out-of-state sellers, 2011 SF 27 SJ 1192)

==== Voter ID ====
Bonoff authored a bill calling for voter verification, which would create a link between the Secretary of State's voting rolls and the Department of Motor Vehicles records (2012 SF 2555). This bill did not require a constitutional amendment. Bonoff voted against placing a constitutional amendment for voter ID on the ballot (2012 SF 1577/HF 2738 SJ 4938), against legislation requiring an ID to vote (2011 SF 509 SJ 1452), against attempts to eliminate the practice of "vouching" for others' identities at the polls (2010 SF 2388 SJ 7462), and against clarifying eligibility rules on the absentee ballot.(2010 SF 2622 SJ 7400).

==== LGBT Rights ====
Bonoff voted against placing a constitutional amendment on the ballot to define marriage as between one man and one woman (2011 SF 1308, SJ 1978), saying that the Constitution should not be used to limit people's rights and that marriage should be left to faith communities.

==== Abortion ====
Bonoff supported an abortion alternatives grant program agency eligibility modification (SF2330/HF2676).

== 2008 campaign for Congress ==
After serving in the Minnesota legislature for two years, Bonoff ran for the 3rd congressional district seat held by the retiring Jim Ramstad.

Among the groups that supported Bonoff's congressional race were Minnesota Forward, Emily's List, the Minnesota chapter of the Association of Community Organizations for Reform Now, and AFSCME.

On April 12, 2008, Bonoff left the race after Ashwin Madia was endorsed by the DFL party.

== 2016 campaign for Congress ==
In 2016, Bonoff ran for the U.S. House to represent Minnesota's 3rd congressional district. In May 2016, Bonoff received the endorsement of the DFL party and began campaigning for the general election. In July she announced she had raised over $620,000 for the race. Bonoff received endorsements from Womenwinning, the League of Conservation Voters, and Emily's List. She was also endorsed by AFSCME, Building Trades, Regional Council of Carpenters, LiUNA!, SMART, Human Rights Campaign PAC, End Citizens United, MN Professional Firefighters, American Association for Justice, National Organization for Women, Sierra Club and ECM Publishers, Inc. Shortly after she announced her candidacy in April 2016, Bonoff's campaign was highlighted by the DCCC as a nationally targeted "Red to Blue" race.

In the November 8, 2016, general election, Bonoff was defeated by incumbent Republican Erik Paulsen, who won 57% of the vote.

== Jewish Family & Career Services ==
Boniff later moved to Atlanta, Georgia after her husband joined Delta Air Lines. In 2019, Bonoff became CEO of the Atlanta-based disability, career and elderly service provider Jewish Family & Career Services.

== Electoral history ==
- Minnesota Senate 44th district election, 2012
  - Terri Bonoff (DFL), 27,203 votes (55.81%)
  - David Gaither (R), 21,464 votes (44.04%)
  - Write-in, 75 votes (0.15%)
- Minnesota Senate 43rd district election, 2010
  - Terri Bonoff (DFL), 18,271 votes (51.74%)
  - Norann Dillon (R), 17,018 votes (48.19%)
  - Write-in, 22 votes (0.06%)
- Minnesota Senate 43rd district election, 2006
  - Terri Bonoff (DFL), 19,159 votes (51.93%)
  - Judy Johnson (R), 17,697 votes (47.96%)
  - Write-in, 41 votes, (0.11%)
- Minnesota Senate 43rd district special election, 2005
  - Terri Bonoff (DFL), 5,745 votes (54.44%)
  - Judy Johnson (R), 4,802 votes (45.50%)
  - Write-in, 6 votes (0.06%)
