= Daniel Trabue House =

- U.S. National Register of Historic Places
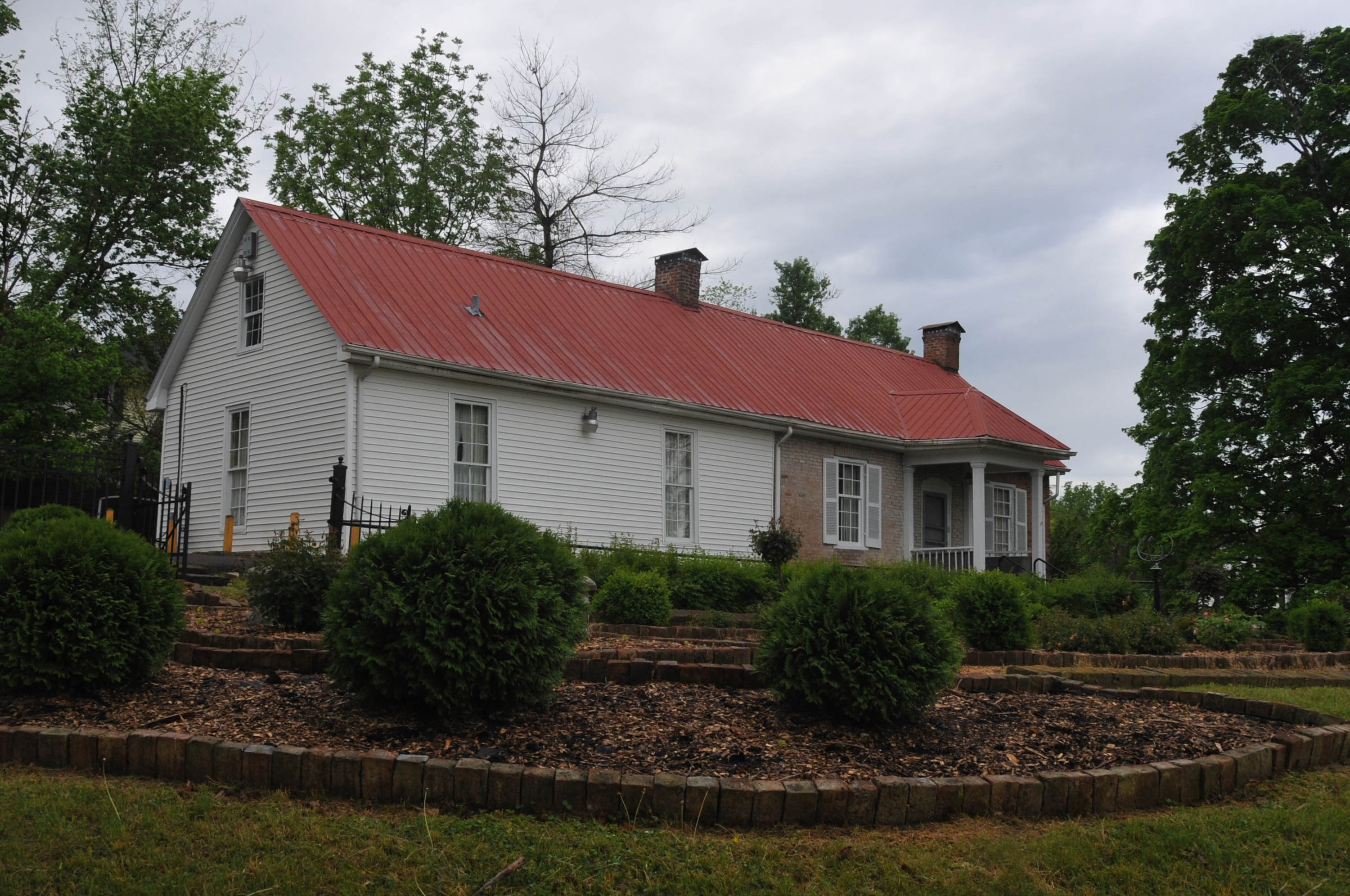

- Location within Kentucky Location within the United States
- Location: 299 Jamestown St., Columbia, Kentucky
- Coordinates: 37°06′02″N 85°18′11″W
- Area: less than one acre
- Built: 1823
- NRHP reference No.: 74000848
- Added to NRHP: December 16, 1974

The Daniel Trabue House, at 299 Jamestown St. in Columbia, Kentucky, was built in 1823. It was listed on the National Register of Historic Places in 1974.

It was home of Daniel Trabue, famous for his early account of life in Kentucky, Westward into Kentucky.

The original portion of the house was a two-room brick building, with a full attic above, within what is now the southwest corner of the house.
