= The Least of These: The Graham Staines Story =

- Directed by: Aneesh Daniel
- Written by: Andrew Matthews
- Based on: The life of Graham Staines
- Starring: Stephen Baldwin; Sharman Joshi; Shari Rigby
- Production company: Victor Abraham
- Distributed by: Skypass Entertainment Inc.
- Release dates: 1 February 2019 (USA); 29 March 2019 (India)
- Running time: 112 minutes
- Country: United States
- Language: English
- Box office: $695,164

The Least of These is a 2019 drama film based on the true story of Graham Staines, an Australian missionary who worked in India helping people with leprosy. The film is directed by Aneesh Daniel and written by Andrew Matthews. Stephen Baldwin plays Staines.

== Plot ==
As the social fabric of life in rural India disintegrates in the late 1990s, journalist Manav Banerjee (Sharman Joshi) moves with his pregnant wife to the State of Orissa in hope of a better life and the promise of a lucrative career. When speculation mounts that local Australian missionary Graham Staines (Stephen Baldwin) is illegally proselytizing leprosy patients, Manav agrees to investigate undercover for the newspaper. What he finds is a series of revelations that are difficult to fathom and even harder to explain, and Manav is forced to make a choice between his own ambition and the truth. In the end, his actions spark a tragic event that is felt around the world. Based on a true story and shot on location in India.

== Cast ==
- Stephen Baldwin as Graham Staines
- Sharman Joshi as Manav Banerjee
- Shari Rigby as Gladys Staines
- Manoj Mishra as Mahendra
- Prakash Belawadi as Kedar Mishra
- Aditi Chengappa as Shanti Banerjee
- Aneesh Daniel as House Agent
- Campbell Ellis as Philip Staines
- Emily Ellis as Esther Staines
- Isaac Ellis as Timothy Staines
- Surender Sahil Verma

== Reception ==
=== Critical response ===
Devesh Sharma of Filmfare giving three stars out of five says, "Indeed, it's the performances that make you sit up and take notice of this flawed film. It does introduce you to the horrors of leprosy, at one time you feel you're watching something about The Holocaust. But then it delves into OTT melodrama, thereby losing its balance...."

Philip Martin writing for Arkansas Democrat-Gazette says, "The Least of These is a watchable faith-based film made by a group from Texas, filmed on location in India under the entirely orthodox direction of Aneesh Daniel." and "While there's a certain obviousness to the plotting, and a necessary streamlining of knotty issues into easily digested factoids, for the most part The Least of These does a good job of communicating the selflessness of people like Staines and the genuinely inspiring example of his widow, Gladys (Shari Rigby)."

Writing for The Times of India Renuka Vyavahare rates the film with three stars out of five and opines, "Like the subject it tackles, Aneesh Daniel's execution and Andrew Matthew's writing seems a tad agenda driven." Vyavahare further observes, "Instead of letting people decide for themselves, the narrative tells them what to believe and that's a bit of a put off". "The facts behind the gruesome murders, for which Bajrang Dal member Dara Singh is serving a life sentence, are watered down to the extent that the movie will offend nobody except those seeking to draw connections between the killings in the late 1990s and the current spate of attacks on minority groups," writes Nandini Ramnath for Scroll.in.

== Accolades ==
The film was awarded the Faith & Freedom Award at the 2020 MovieGuide Awards.
