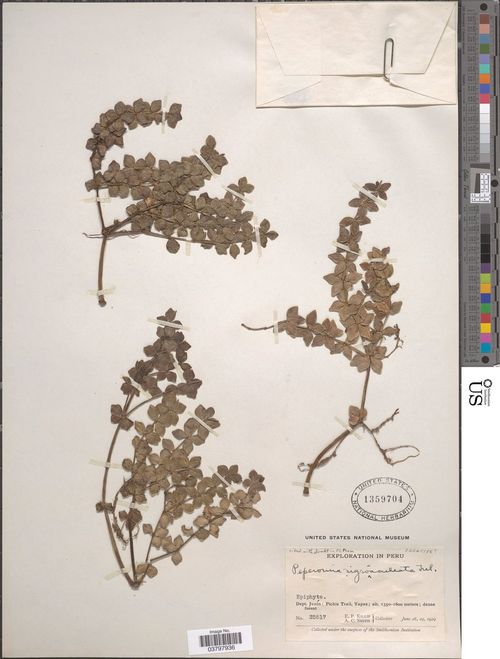

Scientific classification
- Kingdom: Plantae
- Clade: Tracheophytes
- Clade: Angiosperms
- Clade: Magnoliids
- Order: Piperales
- Family: Piperaceae
- Genus: Peperomia
- Species: P. nigro-oculata

Binomial name
- Peperomia nigro-oculata Trel.

= Peperomia nigro-oculata =

Species of plant

Peperomia nigro-oculata is a species of terrestrial or epiphytic herb in the genus Peperomia that is native to Peru. It grows on wet tropical biomes. Its conservation status is Threatened.

== Description ==
The type specimen were collected at Chachapoyas, Peru.

Peperomia nigro-oculata is a small, creeping then ascending herb with a slender, more or less pilose stem. The leaves are typically in whorls of 4. They are round-rhombic, bluntly acuminate, with an acute base, measuring 8 mm long and 6–8 mm wide. They are obscurely 1–3-nerved, sparsely puberulous beneath, and scattered with punctations and black centers or papillae on both surfaces. The petiole is 1 mm long, slightly pilose. The terminal spikes, when young, are 10 mm long and 1 mm thick, with a velvety rachis, and are borne on a sparsely pilose peduncle 15 mm long.

== Taxonomy and naming ==
It was described in 1936 by William Trelease in Publications of the Field Museum of Natural History, Botanical Series 13, from specimens collected by Andrew Mathews.

The epithet is derived from the Latin niger and oculatus, referring to the distinctive black-centered dots or punctations that speckle the leaf surfaces.

== Distribution and habitat ==
It is native to Peru. It grows as a terrestrial or epiphytic herb. It grows on wet tropical biomes.

== Conservation ==
This species is assessed as Threatened, in a preliminary report.
