= Andrew Mathews =

Andrew Mathews may refer to:

- Andrew Mathews (Royal Navy officer)
- Andrew Mathews (politician)

== See also ==
- Andrew Matthews (disambiguation)
