= Andrew Matthews =

Andrew Matthews may refer to:

- Andrew Matthews (bobsleigh) (born 1988), British bobsledder
- Andrew Matthews (entomologist) (1815–1897), British clergyman and entomologist
- Andrew Matthews (author) (born 1957), Australian author
- Andrew Edward Bertie Matthews (died 1995), medical student who volunteered to assist at Bergen-Belsen concentration camp
- Andy Matthews, American politician in the Nevada Assembly

== See also ==
- Andrew Mathews (Royal Navy officer) (born 1958), Royal Navy officer
- Andrew Mathews (politician), American politician in the Minnesota Senate
