= O. W. Coburn School of Law =

Oral Roberts University law school (1979–1986)

The O. W. Coburn School of Law was the law school of Oral Roberts University. The school was named after donor Orin Wesley Coburn, the founder of Coburn Optical Industries and the father of future US politician Tom Coburn.

The school opened in 1979. Its founding dean was Charles Kothe, a Tulsa, Oklahoma, labor attorney. Other professors included Anita Hill, John Eidsmoe, Gary Lane, Herb Titus, and Rutherford Institute founder John W. Whitehead.

In 1986, the school closed, with its 190,000 volume law library, as well as 5 professors and 23 students, moving to CBN University (renamed Regent University in 1990). Since the new CBN law school did not receive provisional accreditation until 1989, students graduating in spring 1987 were allowed to state they graduated from Coburn, in order to be listed as graduating from an accredited school.

U.S. Representative Michele Bachmann began attending Coburn the year it opened, and graduated as part of its last class.

== Accreditation controversy ==
In May 1981, the American Bar Association (ABA), which provides accreditation for US law schools, denied Coburn's initial application for provisional accreditation. Oral Roberts University's requirement that students must take an oath of religious faith was considered to be contrary to ABA's Standard 211, which states:

A law school shall foster and maintain equality of opportunity in legal education, including employment of faculty and staff, without discrimination or segregation on the basis of race, color, religion, national origin, gender or sexual orientation, age or disability.

The school sued the ABA, claiming that the denial was a violation of their First Amendment rights. A judge enjoined the ABA from denying provisional accreditation, ruling that the ABA's role in accreditation is equivalent to a "state action," and that Standard 211 denied a private institution's right to freedom of religion without any restrictions by the state.

After a "spirited debate," the ABA's House of Delegates in August 1981 voted 147 to 127 to amend Standard 211 to add a clause including the phrase:

Nothing herein shall be construed to prevent a law school from having a religious affiliation and purpose and adopting policies of admission and employment that directly relate to such affiliation and purpose so long as notice of such policies has been provided to applicants, students, faculty and employees.

Coburn was then granted provisional accreditation.

== See also ==
- List of defunct law schools in the United States
