= Michele Bachmann =

American politician (born 1956)

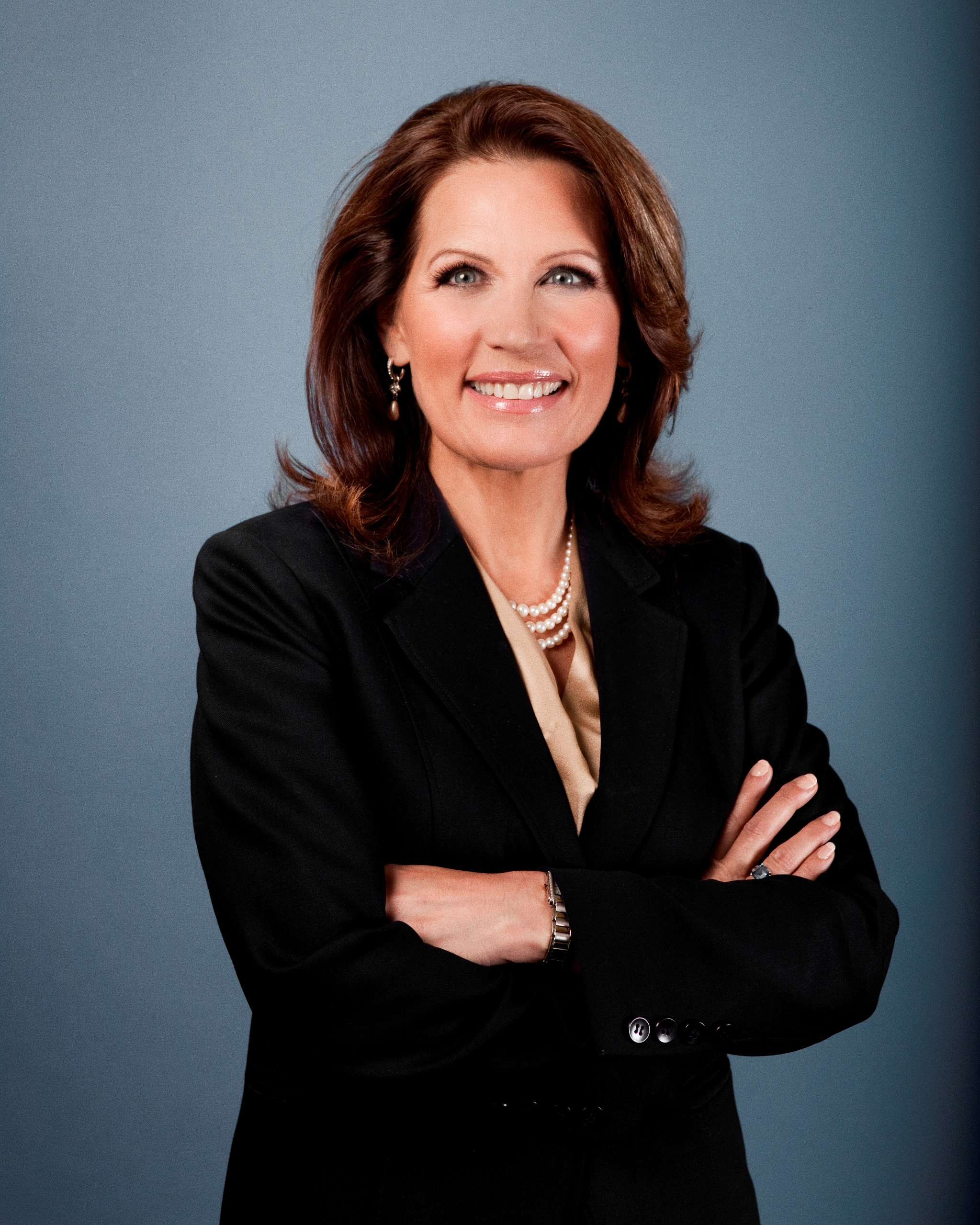
- Bachmann in 2011

Member of the U.S. House of Representatives from Minnesota's 6th district
- In office January 3, 2007 – January 3, 2015
- Preceded by: Mark Kennedy
- Succeeded by: Tom Emmer

Member of the Minnesota Senate
- In office January 3, 2001 – January 2, 2007
- Preceded by: Gary Laidig
- Succeeded by: Ray Vandeveer
- Constituency: 56th district (2001–2003); 52nd district (2003–2007)

Personal details
- Born: Michele Marie Amble; April 6, 1956 (age 70) Waterloo, Iowa, U.S.
- Party: Republican (1978–present)
- Other political affiliations: Democratic (before 1978)
- Spouse: Marcus Bachmann (m. 1978)
- Children: 5
- Education: Winona State University (BA); Oral Roberts University (JD); College of William and Mary (LLM)

Michele Marie Bachmann (/ˈbɑːxmən/; née Amble; born April 6, 1956) is an American politician who was the U.S. representative for Minnesota's 6th congressional district from 2007 until 2015. A member of the Republican Party, she was a candidate for president of the United States in the 2012 election, but dropped out after the Iowa caucuses.

Born in Waterloo, Iowa, Bachmann moved to Brooklyn Park, Minnesota as a teenager. She earned a bachelor's degree from Winona State University, a Juris Doctor from Oral Roberts University's O. W. Coburn School of Law, and a Master of Laws from William & Mary Law School. She briefly worked in tax law for the Internal Revenue Service before becoming a stay-at-home mother. She became involved in local politics, focusing on education issues.

Bachmann formally entered politics when she was elected to the Minnesota Senate in 2000. In 2006, she was elected to the U.S. House of Representatives. After her unsuccessful run for president, Bachmann was elected to another term in the House in 2012. She announced her retirement before the 2014 election.

Bachmann is the Distinguished Professor at Large, Israel Institute at Regent University.

== Early life, education, and early career ==
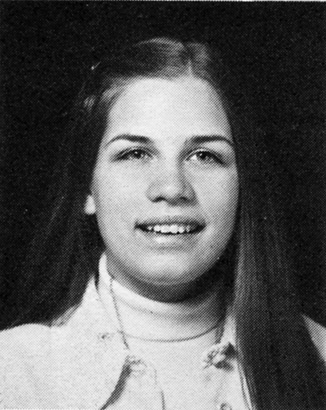
Bachmann in Anoka High School's yearbook

Bachmann was born Michele Marie Amble on April 6, 1956, in Waterloo, Iowa, to Norwegian-American parents David John Amble, an engineer, and Arlene Jean Amble (née Johnson). Two of her great-great-great-grandparents, Melchior and Martha Munson, emigrated from Sogndal, Norway, to Wisconsin in 1857. Her family moved from Iowa to Brooklyn Park, Minnesota when she was 13 years old. After her parents divorced when she was 14, David moved to California and remarried. Bachmann was raised by her mother, who worked at the First National Bank in Anoka, Minnesota, where they moved again. Three years later her mother married widower Raymond J. LaFave; the new marriage resulted in a family with nine children.

In Anoka High School, Bachmann was a cheerleader. She graduated from high school in 1974 and, after graduation, spent one summer working at kibbutz Be'eri in Israel with Young Life, an evangelical youth organization. In 1978, she graduated from Winona State University with a B.A. In 1979, Bachmann was a member of the first class of the O. W. Coburn School of Law, then a part of Oral Roberts University (ORU). There she studied with John Eidsmoe, whom she described in 2011 as "one of the professors who had a great influence on me". Bachmann worked as a research assistant on Eidsmoe's 1987 book Christianity and the Constitution, which argues that the United States was founded as a Christian theocracy and should become one again. In 1986, she received a J.D. degree from Oral Roberts University.

A member of ORU's final graduating class, she was also part of a group of faculty, staff, and students who moved ORU's library to what is now Regent University. In 1988, she received an LL.M. degree in tax law from William & Mary Law School. From 1988 to 1993, she worked for the Internal Revenue Service (IRS). However, she never took the bar examination or obtained a license to become an attorney. Bachmann left the IRS to become a full-time mother when her fourth child was born.

== Early political career ==
=== Activism ===
She grew up in a Democratic family and has said she became a Republican during her senior year at Winona State University. She told the Star Tribune that she was reading Gore Vidal's 1973 novel Burr and that Vidal "was kind of mocking the Founding Fathers and I just thought—I just remember reading the book, putting it in my lap, looking out the window and thinking, 'You know what? I don't think I am a Democrat. I must be a Republican.'" While still a registered Democrat, she and her then-fiancé, Marcus, were motivated to join the anti-abortion movement after watching Francis Schaeffer's 1976 Christian documentary film How Should We Then Live?. They prayed outside clinics and engaged in sidewalk counseling, an activity in which anti-abortion activists attempt to persuade women entering clinics not to get abortions. She has since made statements supportive of sidewalk counseling. Bachmann supported Jimmy Carter for president in 1976, and together with her husband, Bachmann worked on Carter's campaign. During Carter's presidency, she became disappointed with his approach to public policy, support for legalized abortion, and economic decisions she held responsible for increased gas prices. In the 1980 presidential election, she voted for Ronald Reagan and worked for his campaign.

Bachmann's political activism gained media attention at an anti-abortion protest in 1991. She and approximately 30 other protesters went to a Ramsey County Board meeting where $3 million was to be appropriated to build a morgue for the county at St. Paul-Ramsey Medical Center, now known as Regions Hospital. The Medical Center performed abortions and employed pro-choice activist Jane Hodgson. Bachmann voiced her opposition to tax dollars going to the hospital; to the Star Tribune, she said, "in effect, since 1973, I have been a landlord of an abortion clinic, and I don't like that distinction". In 1993, she and six other co-founders started the K–12 New Heights Charter School in Stillwater. The publicly funded school's charter mandated that it be non-sectarian in all programs and practices, but the school soon developed a strong Christian orientation. Parents of students at the school complained and the superintendent of schools warned her that the school was in violation of state law. Six months after the school's founding, she resigned and the Christian orientation was removed from the curriculum, allowing the school to keep its charter. She then began speaking against a state-mandated set of educational standards, including her opposition to School-to-Work policies, which propelled her into politics. In November 1999, she and four other Republicans were candidates in an election for the school board of Stillwater; they were not elected.

=== Minnesota Senate ===
Before launching her career for the Minnesota Senate, Bachmann was encouraged to run by her family and local conservative organizations. Bachmann became a Minnesota state senator after defeating incumbent Gary Laidig in district 56 in 2000. After redistricting due to the 2000 Census, she defeated Jane Krentz, a Minnesota Democratic–Farmer–Labor Party (DFL) incumbent, in district 52.

During her career as state senator, she was known for her conservatism, particularly due to her opposition to abortion and gay marriage. Star Tribune has described her as one of the Senate's most conservative members during her tenure. She also authored a Taxpayer Bill of Rights. Bachmann and Mary Liz Holberg, a Minnesota Representative, proposed a constitutional amendment that would bar the state from legally recognizing same-sex marriage in November 2003. On the day of introducing the amendments, Bachmann's lesbian stepsister came to the legislature building to listen to a hearing about the amendment. She reintroduced the proposal in 2005; it failed when it stalled indefinitely in the Minnesota Senate Judiciary committee. She served as assistant minority leader in charge of policy of the Senate Republican Caucus from November 2004 to July 2005, when the Republican Caucus removed her from the position. She claimed that disagreements with Dick Day, the Republican Senate minority leader, over her anti-tax stance caused her ouster.

== U.S. House of Representatives ==
From 2007 to 2015, Bachmann represented Minnesota's 6th congressional district, which included the northernmost and eastern suburbs of the Twin Cities and St. Cloud. She became the first Republican woman from Minnesota to be elected to the House of Representatives.

=== 110th Congress ===
==== Foreign affairs ====
Bachmann voted "No" on a January 2007 resolution in the House of Representatives opposing President George W. Bush's plan to increase troop levels in Iraq, but called for a full hearing in advance of the troop surge, saying, "the American people deserve to hear and understand the merits of increasing U.S. troop presence in Iraq. Increased troop presence is justifiable if that measure would bring a swift conclusion to a difficult conflict." She hesitated to give a firm endorsement, calling the hearings "a good first step in explaining to the American people the course toward victory in Iraq." Later that year, she went to Iraq, where she said she was convinced that "the war effort is heading in the right direction."

==== Higher education ====
On July 11, 2007, Bachmann voted against the College Cost Reduction and Access Act. The act raised the maximum Pell grant from $4,310 to $5,200, lowered interest rates on subsidized student loans from 6.8% to 3.4%, raised loan limits from $7,500 to $30,500, disfavored married students who filed joint tax returns, provided more favorable repayment terms to students who could not use their education to prosper financially, and favored public sector over private sector workers with much more favorable loan forgiveness benefits. Supporters of the bill said it would allow more students to attend college and prosper for the rest of their lives.

Bachmann said she opposed the act because "it fails students and taxpayers with gimmicks, hidden costs and poorly targeted aid. It contains no serious reform of existing programs, and it favors the costly, government-run direct lending program over nonprofit and commercial lenders." The bill passed the House and was signed by President Bush.

==== Energy and environment ====
During the summer of 2008, as national gasoline prices rose to over $4 a gallon, Bachmann became a leading Congressional advocate for increased domestic oil and natural gas exploration in the Arctic National Wildlife Refuge (ANWR) and the Outer Continental Shelf. She joined ten other House Republicans and members of the media on a Congressional Energy Tour to the National Renewable Energy Laboratory in Golden, Colorado, and to Alaska. The trip was arranged by Arctic Power, an Alaskan lobbying group that advocates for ANWR development. Its purpose was to receive a firsthand account of emerging renewable energy technologies and the prospects of increased domestic oil and natural gas production in Alaska, including ANWR.

Bachmann rejects the idea that climate change is real, progressing, and primarily caused by humans. She has claimed that global warming is "all voodoo, nonsense, hokum, a hoax" and has been called "one of the GOP's loudest global warming skeptics." She has claimed, baselessly, that "because life requires carbon dioxide and it is part of the planet's life cycle, it cannot be harmful." On the House floor on Earth Day 2009, Bachmann said she opposed cap and trade climate legislation, again making disproven claims that "carbon dioxide is not a harmful gas, it is a harmless gas. Carbon dioxide is natural; it is not harmful ... We're being told we have to reduce this natural substance to create an arbitrary reduction in something that is naturally occurring in the earth."

In March 2008 Bachmann introduced H.R. 849, the Light Bulb Freedom of Choice Act. The bill would have repealed two sections of the Energy Independence and Security Act of 2007 signed into law by George W. Bush. The 2007 Energy Act mandates energy efficiency and labeling standards for incandescent and fluorescent bulbs. Bachmann's bill would have required the Government Accountability Office to show that a change to fluorescent bulbs would have "clear economic, health and environmental benefits" before enforcing lighting efficiency regulations. The bill would have allowed these standards to remain in place if the comptroller general found they would lead to consumer savings, reduce carbon-dioxide emissions and pose no health risks to consumers (such as risks posed by the presence of mercury in fluorescent bulbs). The bill languished in the House and became inactive at the end of the 110th Congress. Bachmann reintroduced the bill in March 2011.

==== Tort reform ====
On June 3, 2008, President Bush signed the Credit and Debit Card Receipt Clarification Act (H.R. 4008) into law. The bipartisan bill, which Bachmann cosponsored with Congressman Tim Mahoney (D-Fla.), removed statutory damages for violations of a 2003 federal law prohibiting merchants from printing consumers' credit card numbers and expiration dates on sales receipts, in order to end class-action lawsuits aimed at businesses that violated the law.

==== Financial sector ====
Bachmann opposed both versions of the Wall Street bailout bill for America's financial sector. She voted against the first proposed $700 billion bailout of financial institutions, which failed to pass, by a vote of 205–228. She also advocated breaking up Fannie Mae and Freddie Mac and barring executives from excessive compensation or golden parachutes, and advocated a plan that would suspend mark-to-market accounting rules and suspend the capital gains tax.

==== Auto industry ====
The American auto companies approached Congress to ask for roughly $15 billion in loans to keep them operational into 2009. Bachmann criticized that bill, fearing that the initial sum of money would be followed by subsequent ones without the companies making changes to revive their business. Bachmann supported an alternative plan for American auto companies and the rest of the auto industry that would have set benchmarks for reducing their debt and renegotiating labor deals and have set up the financial assistance as interim insurance instead of a taxpayer-financed bailout.

==== Call for a media "exposé" of alleged "anti-Americanism" of Barack Obama and members of Congress ====
On October 17, 2008, Bachmann gave an interview on MSNBC's Hardball with Chris Matthews in support of the presidential campaign of Senator John McCain that brought the Minnesota 6th Congressional District race national attention. During the interview she criticized Barack Obama for his association with Jeremiah Wright and Bill Ayers, saying, "usually we associate with people who have similar ideas to us, and it seems that it calls into question what Barack Obama's true beliefs, and values, and thoughts are ... I am very concerned that he [Obama] may have anti-American views." She noted the bombing campaign orchestrated by Bill Ayers before discussing his association with Obama, arguing that "Bill Ayers is not someone the average American wants to see their president have an association with." Matthews followed up by asking "But he [Obama] is a Senator from the state of Illinois; he's one of the members of Congress you suspect of being anti-American. How many people in the Congress of the United States do you think are anti-American? You've already suspected Barack Obama; is he alone or are there others?" Bachmann answered, "What I would say is that the news media should do a penetrating exposé and take a look ... I wish they would ... I wish the American media would take a great look at the views of the people in Congress and find out are they pro-America, or anti-America. I think people would love to see an exposé like that."

In response, the five Democratic members of Minnesota's congressional delegation—Tim Walz, Betty McCollum, Keith Ellison, Collin Peterson and Jim Oberstar—issued a joint statement questioning Bachmann's ability to "work in a bipartisan way to put the interests of our country first in this time of crisis." Former Secretary of State Colin Powell and former Minnesota Governor Arne Carlson said her comments had influenced their decisions to endorse Obama for president.

Bachmann brought up the interview before business leaders and Republicans during a campaign stop in St. Cloud, Minnesota, on October 21, 2008. She claimed she never intended to question Obama's patriotism. "I made a misstatement. I said a comment that I would take back. I did not, nor do I, question Barack Obama's patriotism ... I did not say that Barack Obama is anti-American nor do I believe that Barack Obama is anti-American ... [But] I'm very concerned about Barack Obama's views. I don't believe that socialism is a good thing for America." At a March 2010 fund-raiser for the Susan B. Anthony List, Bachmann said, "I said I had very serious concerns that Barack Obama had anti-American views—and now I look like Nostradamus". In March 2011 she was asked on Meet the Press whether she still believed that Obama held un-American views. She responded, "I believe that the actions of this government have—have been emblematic of ones that have not been based on true American values." Pressed for clarification, she said, "I've already answered that question before. I said I had very serious concerns about the president's views."

=== 111th Congress ===
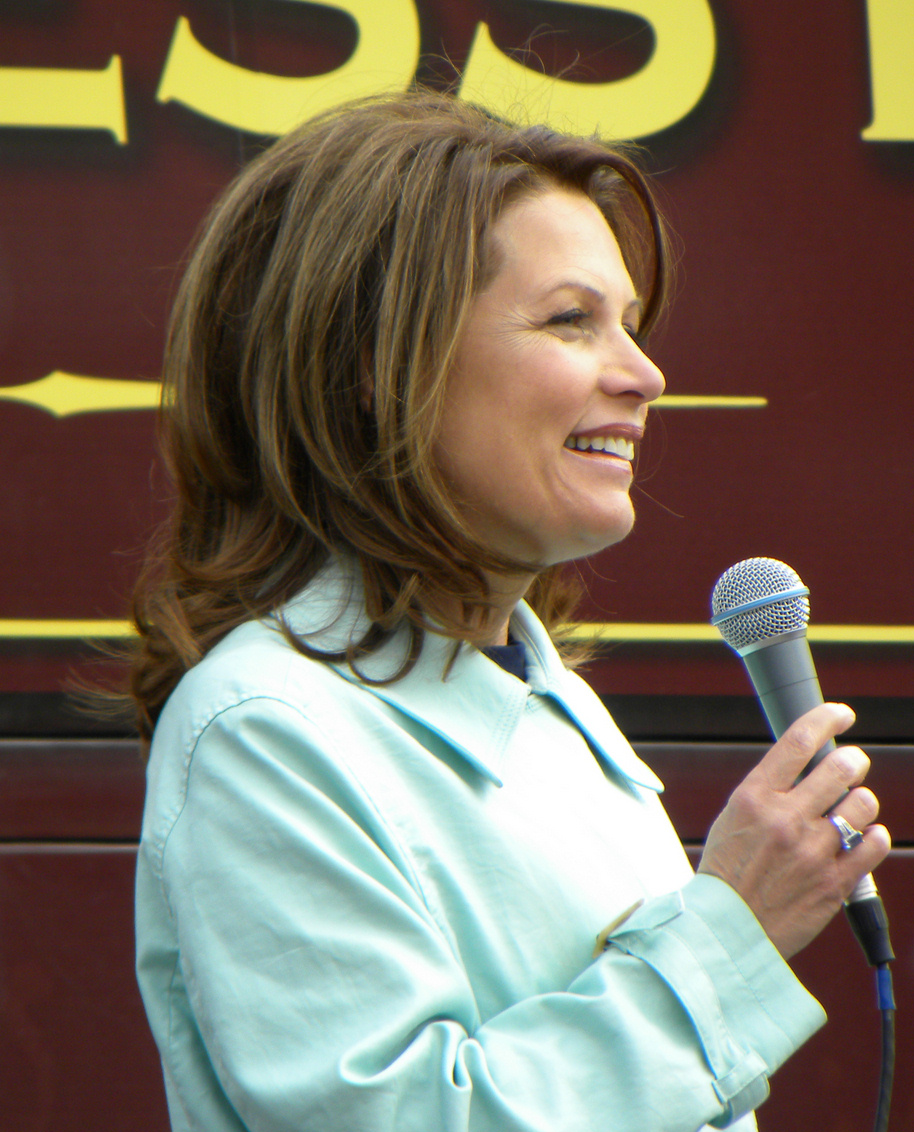
Bachmann speaking in April 2010

==== Global currency ====
On March 26, 2009, following comments by China proposing adoption of a global reserve currency, Bachmann introduced a resolution calling for a Constitutional amendment to bar the dollar from being replaced by a foreign currency. Current law prohibits foreign currency from being recognized in the U.S., but Bachmann expressed concerns relating to the president's power to make and interpret treaties. Earlier that month, at a Financial Services Committee hearing, Bachmann asked both Treasury Secretary Timothy Geithner and Federal Reserve Chairman Ben Bernanke whether they would reject calls for the U.S. to move away from the U.S. dollar and they replied that they would.

==== 2010 Census ====
In a June 17, 2009, interview with The Washington Times, Bachmann expressed concern that the questions on the 2010 United States census had become "very intricate, very personal" and that ACORN, a community organizing group that had come under fire the previous year, might be part of the Census Bureau's door-to-door information collection efforts. She said, "I know, for my family, the only question we will be answering is how many people are in our home. We won't be answering any information beyond that, because the Constitution doesn't require any information beyond that." According to PolitiFact, her statement was incorrect, as the Constitution does require citizens to complete the census. Fellow Republican representatives Patrick McHenry (N.C.), Lynn Westmoreland (Ga.) and John Mica (Fla.), members of the Oversight and Government Reform Subcommittee on Information Policy, Census and National Archives, which oversees the census, subsequently asked Bachmann not to boycott the population count.

Along with Congressman Ted Poe (Tex.-02), Bachmann introduced the American Community Survey Act to limit the amount of personal information the U.S. Census Bureau solicits. She reiterated her belief that the census asked too many personal questions.

==== Cap-and-trade legislation ====
In March 2009 Bachmann was interviewed by the Northern Alliance Radio Network and promoted two forums she was hosting the next month in St. Cloud and Woodbury about Obama's proposed cap-and-trade tax policy to limit greenhouse gas emissions. She said she wanted Minnesotans "armed and dangerous on this issue of the energy tax because we need to fight back." Bachmann's office quickly clarified that she was speaking metaphorically, meaning "armed with knowledge". According to the Star Tribune, her quote went viral across the Internet.

==== AmeriCorps ====
In 2009 Bachmann became a critic of what she characterized as proposals for mandatory public service. Of the Edward M. Kennedy Serve America Act, an expansion to AmeriCorps (a federal community service organization), she said in April:

It's under the guise of—quote—volunteerism. But it's not volunteers at all. It's paying people to do work on behalf of government ... I believe that there is a very strong chance that we will see that young people will be put into mandatory service. And the real concerns is [sic] that there are provisions for what I would call re-education camps for young people, where young people have to go and get trained in a philosophy that the government puts forward and then they have to go to work in some of these politically correct forums.

The original bill called for an exploration of whether a mandatory public service program could be established, but the section on creating a "Congressional Commission on Civic Service" was stripped from the bill.

In August 2009 Bachmann's political opponents publicized in the local media and the blogosphere what they described as the "ironic" fact that her son, Harrison, joined Teach for America, part of the AmeriCorps program.

==== Health care ====
Bachmann contributed to the "death panel" controversy when she read from a July 24 article by former New York Lt. Gov. Betsy McCaughey on the House floor. Sarah Palin said that her "death panel" remark was inspired by what she called the "Orwellian" opinions of Ezekiel Emanuel as described by Bachmann, who accused him of advocating health care rationing by age and disability. According to PolitiFact and Time, Bachmann's euthanasia remarks distorted Emanuel's position on health care for the elderly and disabled. FactCheck.org stated, "We agree that Emanuel's meaning is being twisted." When many doctors wanted to legalize euthanasia or physician-assisted suicide, Emanuel opposed it.

On August 31, 2009, Bachmann spoke at an event in Colorado, saying of Democratic health care overhaul proposals that:

This cannot pass. What we have to do today is make a covenant, to slit our wrists, be blood brothers on this thing. This will not pass. We will do whatever it takes to make sure this doesn't pass.

She outlined ideas for changing the health care system, including: "Erase the boundaries around every single state when it comes to health care", enabling consumers to purchase insurance across state lines; increase the use of health savings accounts and allow everyone to "take full deductibility of all medical expenses", including insurance premiums; and tort reform.

Bachmann denounced the government-run health insurance public option, calling it a "government takeover of health care" that would "squeeze out private health insurance".

==== Criticism of President Obama's visit to Asia ====
In a November 3, 2010, interview with Anderson Cooper, while discussing spending cuts for Medicare and Social Security suggested by Representative Paul Ryan, Bachmann was asked what spending cuts she would make to reduce the deficit. She cited President Obama's then-upcoming visit to Asia as an example, saying it "is expected to cost the taxpayers $200 million a day. He's taking two thousand people with him. He'll be renting out over 870 rooms in India. And these are 5-star hotel rooms at the Taj Mahal Palace hotel. This is the kind of over-the-top spending—it's a very small example, Anderson." Bachmann was apparently referring to information in a story from the Press Trust of India, attributed to "a top official of the Maharashtra Government privy to the arrangements for the high-profile visit", information that was also published in U.S.-based media such as The Drudge Report. A Pentagon spokesman, Geoff Morrell, dismissed the report's claim that 34 warships were accompanying the President as "comical". The White House said that the press report figures were "wildly inflated" and had "no basis in reality". While stating that they could not give the actual projected figures for security reasons, staffers maintained costs were in line with the official travel costs of previous presidents Bush and Clinton.

=== 112th Congress ===
==== Leadership run ====
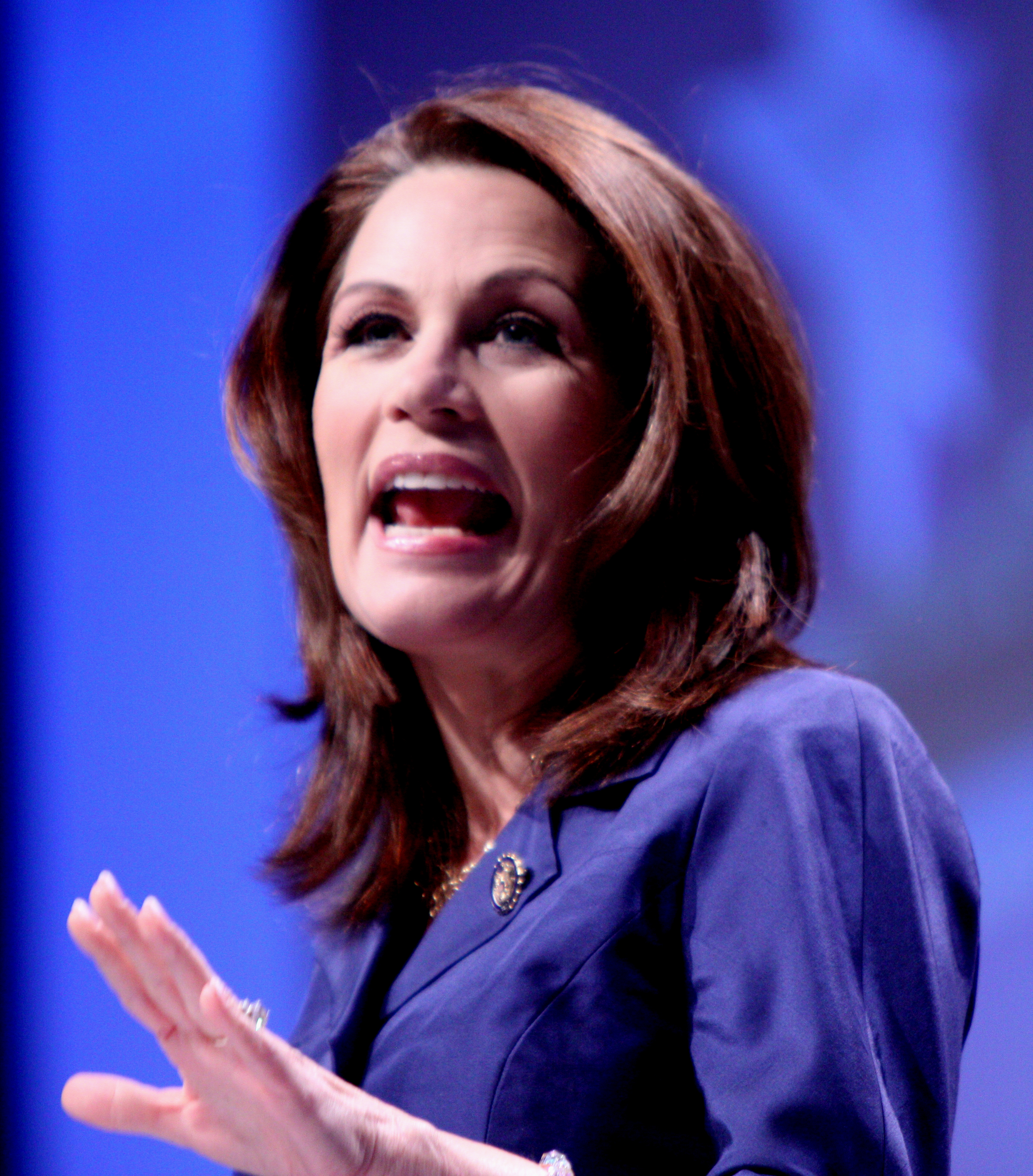
Bachmann in February 2011

After the 2010 elections and Representative Mike Pence's announcement that he was stepping away from his leadership position in the House, Bachmann announced her intention to seek the position of House Republican Conference Chair. As Bachmann was the founder of the House's Tea Party Caucus, her announcement caused some to see the leadership election as "an early test of how GOP leaders will treat the antiestablishment movement's winners". Many among the House's Republican leadership, including Eric Cantor and the retiring Pence, were quick to endorse Representative Jeb Hensarling for the position; Speaker-to-be John Boehner remained neutral on the issue. Supporters of Bachmann's run included Representatives Steve King, John Kline, Louie Gohmert, Chip Cravaack, and Erik Paulsen, as well as media personality and political commentator Glenn Beck. Listing her qualifications for the position, Bachmann noted, "I've done an effective job speaking out at a national and local level, motivating people with our message, calling attention to deficits in Obama's policy. I was instrumental in bringing tens of thousands of people to the U.S. Capitol to rally against Obama care and to attend our press conference." She noted her work to keep the Tea Party within the GOP rather than having it become a third party, thereby helping the party capture the House, saying, "I have been able to bring a voice and motivate people to, in effect, put that gavel in John Boehner's hands, so that Republicans can lead going forward. …It's important that leadership represents the choice of the people coming into our caucus….I think I have motivated a high number of people to get involved in this cycle who may have sat it out and that have made a difference on a number of these races. I gave a large amount of money to NRCC and individual candidates and started Michele PAC, which raised $650,000 for members since July, so I was able to financially help about 50 people out."

Bachmann's bid suffered a setback when she was passed over for the GOP's transition team on which Hensarling was placed. Despite Bachmann's leading all other representatives in fundraising, a Republican aide said some "members are getting resentful of Bachmann, who they say is making the argument that you're not really a Tea Party supporter unless you support her. That's gone through the formation of the Tea Party Caucus and the formation of this candidacy of hers. It's just not so." Sarah Palin, with whom Bachmann had campaigned earlier in the year, declined to endorse her leadership bid, while other Tea Party favorites, Representatives Adam Kinzinger and Tim Scott, were placed on the transition team. According to some senior House staff members, the party leadership was concerned about some of Bachmann's high-profile faux pas, the high rate of turnover among her staff, and how willing she would be to advance the party's messaging rather than her own.

On November 10 Bachmann released a statement ending her campaign for Conference Chair and giving Hensarling her "enthusiastic" support.

==== Committee assignment ====
In 2011, House Speaker John Boehner selected Bachmann for a position on the House Permanent Select Committee on Intelligence, in which role she was responsible for overseeing the Central Intelligence Agency and the National Security Agency. Bachmann, who had not previously served on any committee concerned with foreign policy issues, requested the position, which led to speculation that she was planning a presidential campaign. In his 2021 memoir On the House, Boehner wrote that Bachmann had initially demanded a seat on the House Committee on Ways and Means, and that he had offered her the role on the Intelligence Committee as a compromise; Boehner described Bachmann as "a lunatic" and an example of a politician elevated by Fox News.

==== Repeal of Dodd–Frank reform ====
Soon after beginning her third term, Bachmann introduced legislation to repeal the Dodd–Frank financial reform law. She said, "I'm pleased to offer a full repeal of the job-killing Dodd–Frank financial regulatory bill. Dodd–Frank grossly expanded the federal government beyond its jurisdictional boundaries. It gave Washington bureaucrats the power to interpret and enforce the legislation with little oversight. Real financial regulatory reform must deal with these lenders who were a leading cause of our economic recession. True reform must also end the bailout mind-set that was perpetuated by the last Congress." She also took issue with the law for not addressing the liabilities of the taxpayer funded Fannie Mae and Freddie Mac. Bachmann's bill was endorsed by conservative groups such as the Club for Growth and Americans for Prosperity. It gained four other Republican co-sponsors, including Representative Darrell Issa, who became the new chairman of the House Oversight and Government Reform Committee at the start of the 112th Congress. Bachmann's call for total repeal was seen as more drastic than the approach advocated by her fellow Republican Spencer Bachus, who became the House Financial Services Committee Chairman when Republicans gained the House majority. Bachus planned "to provide 'vigorous' oversight of regulators efforts to reform banking and housing ... reform Fannie and Freddie", and "dismantle pieces of [the] Dodd–Frank Act that he believes 'unnecessarily punish small businesses and community banks.'" In response to Bachmann's legislation Representative Barney Frank said, "Michele Bachmann, the Club for Growth, and others in the right-wing coalition have now made their agenda for the financial sector very clear: they yearn to return to the thrilling days of yesteryear, so the loan arrangers can ride again—untrammeled by any rules restraining irresponsibility, excess, deception, and most of all, infinite leverage." It was seen as unlikely that Bachmann's legislation would pass, with the Financial Times writing, "Like the Republican move to repeal healthcare reform, Ms. Bachmann's bill could be passed by the House of Representatives but be blocked by the Senate or White House."

==== State of the Union response ====
Bachmann responded to Obama's 2011 State of the Union speech on the Tea Party Express website; her speech was broadcast live by CNN. She insisted that her response was not intended to counter Paul Ryan's official Republican party response. When asked whether the speech was an indication of competition with Ryan and Boehner's leadership team, Bachmann dismissed such a view as "a fiction of the media", saying she had alerted Ryan and the leadership team that her response might go national and that no objections were raised.

==== Health care ====
Bachmann continually called for repeal of the Patient Protection and Affordable Care Act (Obamacare). On March 4, 2011, Bachmann, one of the six House Republicans to vote against the continuing resolution that gave a two-week extension until a possible government shutdown, expressed her unhappiness with its passage.

In an appearance on Meet the Press on March 6 and during a March 7 interview with Sean Hannity, Bachmann claimed that the Obama administration and Congressional Democrats had hidden $105 billion in spending in the overhaul of the American Health Care System. She portrayed the Democratic leadership as timing the release of the bill's text to avoid detection of the spending. "We didn't get the bill until a literally couple of hours before we were supposed to vote on it", she said. She also said the spending was split up within different portions of the bill to mask its total cost. Bachmann was told this by the conservative Heritage Foundation, which claimed to have read the tallies of the Congressional Research Service and Congressional Budget Office.

According to some reports of the costs, "about $40 billion would go to the Children's Health Insurance Program, $15 billion would go to Medicare and Medicaid innovation programs, and $9.5 billion would go to the Community Health Centers Fund." As the funds are designated mandatory spending (not controlled by the annual appropriations acts), the funds would have remained even if the move to defund the reform law had succeeded.

Bachmann stated that $16 billion of the money gives Health and Human Services Secretary Kathleen Sebelius a "slush fund ... [to do] whatever she wants with this money." She called on the bills supporters to return the money, saying, "I think this deception that the president and [former House Speaker Nancy] Pelosi and [Senate Majority Leader Harry] Reid put forward with appropriating over $105 billion needs to be given back to the people."

When asked during the Meet the Press interview if she would take back her previous comments that Obama "may have anti-American views" and that his administration had "embraced something called gangster government", Bachmann stood by her statements, saying, "I do believe that actions that have been taken by this White House—I don't take back my statements on gangster government. I think that there have been actions taken by the government that are corrupt ... I said I have very serious concerns about the president's views, and I think the president's actions in the last two years speak for themselves."

In response to Bachmann's charges, Chief Deputy Democratic Whip Jan Schakowsky, who served on the House health subcommittee, pointed out that the report in question was an update of a report that came out in October 2010 and that the costs were spelled out in both the bill and the Congressional Budget Office's estimate of its cost, saying, "Michele Bachmann obviously didn't read the bill, because there was absolutely nothing hidden in that legislation." Schakowsky said the costs were not kept secret, citing the $40 billion for the Children's Health Insurance Program as an example: "There was a robust debate about whether or not that should be included, etc. So this idea of somehow, now at the last minute, there was a secret addition to some kind of funding ... is absolute nonsense."

In a September 2011 Republican presidential debate in Tampa, Bachmann criticized Rick Perry for his support for the humanpapilloma virus (HPV) vaccine and his support for mandating the HPV vaccine for all sixth-grade Texas girls. The American Academy of Pediatrics, Centers for Disease Control and Prevention, American Academy of Family Physicians, American College of Obstetricians and Gynecologists, Advisory Committee on Immunization Practices and other medical organizations worldwide support immunizing girls and boys against HPV. HPV can cause lesions and genital warts, and has been linked to cervical cancer as well as genital and oral cancers in people of any gender. Because the vaccine is effective only if given before the onset of sexual activity and subsequent exposure to the virus, medical groups recommend the three-dose vaccine be given to 11- and 12-year-olds. During the debate and in interviews afterward, Bachmann accused Perry of "crony capitalism" (because Perry's former chief of staff was chief lobbyist for a drug company manufacturing the vaccine), and baselessly claimed that the HPV vaccine was dangerous and caused "mental retardation." She repeatedly referred to an anecdotal account from a mother of a girl who had been immunized for HPV, saying, "She told me that her little daughter took that vaccine, that injection, and she suffered mental retardation thereafter ... There is no second chance for these little girls if there is [sic] any dangerous consequences to their bodies." Shortly after Bachmann's statements at the debate, the American Academy of Pediatrics released a statement: "The American Academy of Pediatrics would like to correct false statements made in the Republican presidential campaign that the HPV vaccine is dangerous and can cause mental retardation. There is absolutely no scientific validity to this statement. Since the vaccine has been introduced, more than 35 million doses have been administered, and it has an excellent safety record." Fewer than one percent of those receiving the vaccine reported neurological side effects or, in rare cases, severe allergic reactions, none linked to changes in cognitive ability. Bachmann later acknowledged that she was not a doctor or a scientist.

==== Muslim Brotherhood ====
In June–July 2012, Bachmann and several other Republican legislators sent a series of letters to oversight agencies at five federal departments citing "serious security concerns" about what Bachmann has called a "deep penetration in the halls of our United States government" by the Muslim Brotherhood. They requested formal investigations into what Bachmann called "influence operations" by the Brotherhood.

Bachmann also accused Huma Abedin, an aide to Secretary of State Hillary Clinton and former Rep. Anthony Weiner's wife, of having family connections to the Muslim Brotherhood.

Bachmann's comments drew what The Washington Post called "fierce criticism from fellow lawmakers and religious groups." In a speech on the Senate floor, 2008 Republican presidential candidate Senator John McCain denounced Bachmann's charges as "specious and degrading". He defended Abedin as a "hard-working and loyal servant of our country and our government" and stated "these attacks on Huma have no logic, no basis and no merit. They need to stop now." House Speaker John Boehner termed Bachmann's allegations "dangerous", and other Republicans also criticized the remarks. Ed Rollins, Bachmann's former campaign manager, called on her to apologize to Abedin and characterized her allegations as "extreme and dishonest."

In a letter to Bachmann, her colleague Rep. Keith Ellison, D-Minn., a Muslim, asked for evidence backing her claims and stated, "Your response simply rehashes claims that have existed for years on anti-Muslim websites and contains no reliable information that the Muslim Brotherhood has infiltrated the U.S. government".

Bachmann replied that "the intention of the letters was to outline the serious national security concerns I had and ask for answers to questions regarding the Muslim Brotherhood and other radical group's access to top Obama administration officials". In a July 19 interview with radio and TV show host Glenn Beck, Bachmann repeated and expanded her allegations, accusing Ellison of having "a long record of being associated with the Council on American–Islamic Relations and with the Muslim Brotherhood". Ellison replied that "I am not now, nor have I ever been, associated with the Muslim Brotherhood."

=== 113th Congress ===
==== Presidential campaign finance investigation ====
In 2013, Bachmann was under investigation by the House Ethics Committee, the Federal Election Commission, the Iowa Senate Ethics Committee, the Urbandale Police Department and the Federal Bureau of Investigation because of alleged campaign finance violations in her 2012 campaign for president.

It is alleged that members of her staff made under-the-table payments, that funds were illegally transferred from her leadership PAC to pay consultants for her presidential campaign and that hidden payments were made to Iowa State Senator Kent Sorenson.

Additionally, a lawsuit was filed alleging that Bachmann and several former staffers stole and misused an Iowa homeschool group's e-mail distribution list. The trial, Heki v. Bachmann, had been set for May 14, 2014, but the case was settled out of court on June 28, 2013.

On July 26, 2013, the House Ethics Committee announced they were conducting a full investigation of Bachmann, saying that they had received a referral from the Office of Congressional Ethics.

==== Retirement ====
On May 29, 2013, Bachmann announced that she would not seek reelection to her Congressional seat in 2014. This announcement, which she made through a pre-recorded video released on YouTube, was made shortly after her former 2012 Democratic challenger, Jim Graves, announced his intentions to run for her seat once again in 2014. Despite Bachmann's claims to the contrary, this led to widespread speculation in the press that she sought to avoid facing off in a rematch against an opponent who nearly defeated her in the preceding election cycle. In a June 2013 Fox News interview, she said she was "not going silent" and would remain involved in politics. She did not rule out a future run for office, or even the White House. With her retirement from Congress, the ethics investigations against her were dropped.

David Lightman and Trevor Graff, writing for McClatchyDC, argued that Bachmann left a "legacy of political missteps and lots of incendiary rhetoric—often loaded with false accusations and wild exaggerations."

=== Committee assignments ===
- Committee on Financial Services
  - Subcommittee on Capital Markets and Government-Sponsored Enterprises
  - Subcommittee on Oversight and Investigations
- Permanent Select Committee on Intelligence

== Political positions ==
Bachmann has described herself as a "strong fiscal conservative". Her views have been described as socially conservative, populist, and pro-business by journalists. Authors Lynne Ford and Mark Andrejevic and journalists Carl Hulse, Steve Benen, Martin Pengelly, and Brian Bakst described Bachmann as a far-right politician. During her time in Congress, she was a notable representative of the Tea Party movement and a critic of Barack Obama and the Democratic Party. She was a supporter of George W. Bush during the 110th Congress but also supported the repeal of his No Child Left Behind Act.

In 2010, the American Conservative Union gave her a rating of 100 while the Americans for Democratic Action gave her 0.

=== Education ===
Bachmann supports the teaching of creationism alongside evolution in public school science classes. During a 2003 interview on the KKMS Christian radio program Talk The Walk, Bachmann said that evolution is a theory that has never been proven one way or the other. She co-authored a bill (with no additional endorsements among her fellow legislators) that would require public schools to include alternative explanations for the origin of life as part of the state's public school science curricula. In October 2006, Bachmann told a debate audience in St. Cloud, Minnesota, "there is a controversy among scientists about whether evolution is a fact or not ... There are hundreds and hundreds of scientists, many of them holding Nobel Prizes, who believe in intelligent design." Despite this, there is an overwhelming scientific consensus that evolution is real, and that intelligent design is not. Indeed, at least one news report presenting a "sampling of Bachmann's ... ludicrous or plain old false claims", stated that Bachmann's claims are untrue, and that "when the science isn't on [Bachmann's] side, she simply improvises."

Bachmann has praised the Christian youth ministry You Can Run But You Cannot Hide International (YCRBYCH), hailing "the group's work of sharing the gospel in public schools". She appeared as a keynote speaker at their fundraisers in 2006 and 2009. Following a 2011 controversial invocation for the Minnesota House, YCRBYCH founder Bradlee Dean declared that criticisms of him and his ministry were also "intended to harm and destroy the presidential campaign of Congresswoman Michele Bachmann ... [who] previously praised and prayed for the work of my ministry".

Bachmann has had a history of opposing anti-bullying legislation. In 2006, she told the Minnesota Legislature that passing an anti-bullying bill would be a waste of time. "I think for all of us, our experience in public schools is there have always been bullies", she said. "Always have been, always will be. I just don't know how we're ever going to get to the point of zero tolerance ... What does it mean? ... Will we be expecting boys to be girls?".

=== Fiscal policy ===
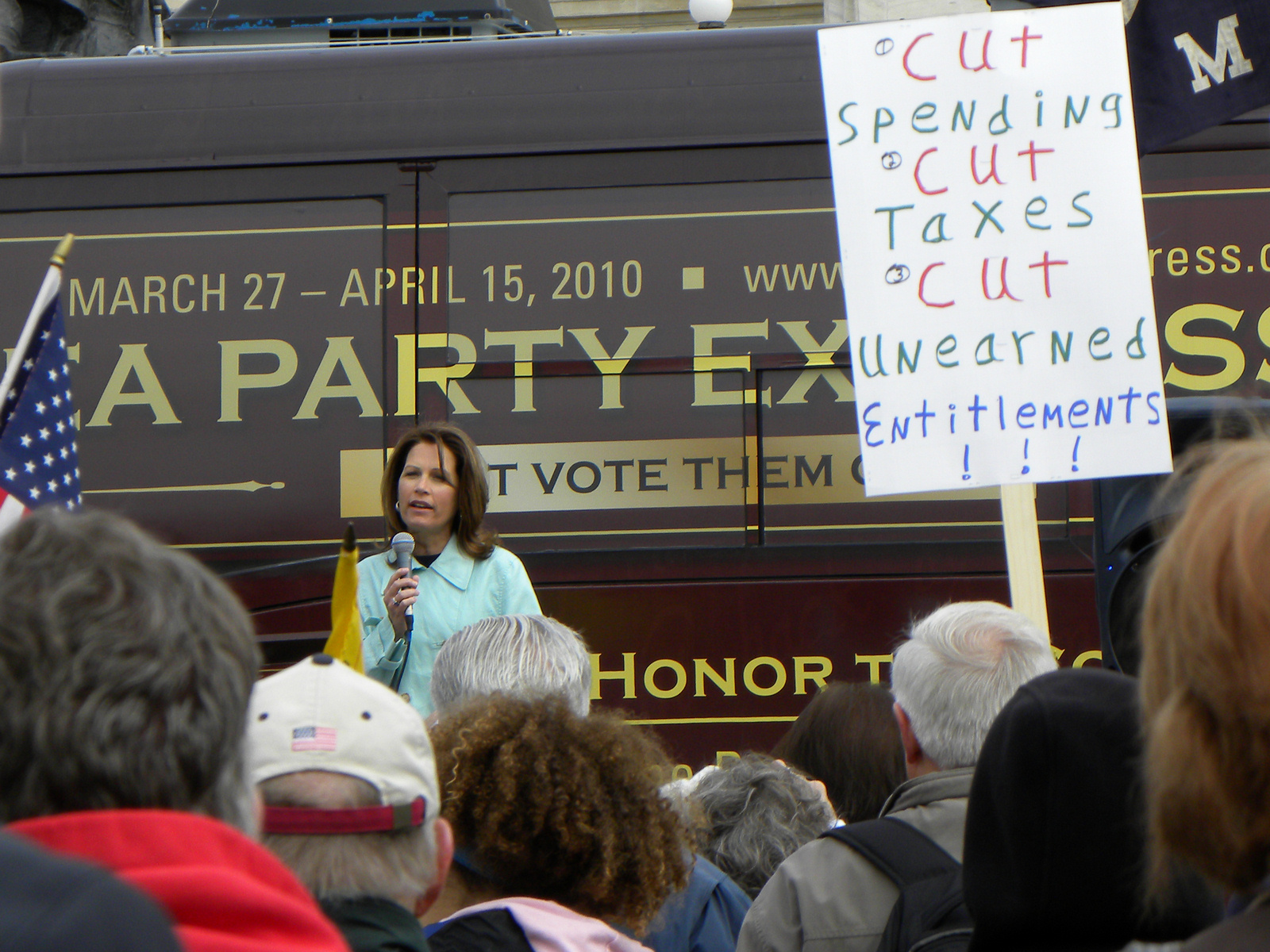
Bachmann addressing a Tea Party Express rally in Minneapolis

In the Minnesota Senate, Bachmann opposed minimum wage increases. In a June 2011 interview, she did not back away from her earlier proposal to eliminate the federal minimum wage, a change she said would "virtually wipe out unemployment." Bachmann supports lowering taxes.

In a 2001 flyer, Bachmann and Michael J. Chapman wrote that federal policies manage a centralized, state-controlled economy in the United States. She wrote that education laws passed by Congress in 2001, including "School To Work" and "Goals 2000", created a new national school curriculum that embraced "a socialist, globalist worldview; loyalty to all government and not America." In 2003, Bachmann said that the "Tax Free Zones" economic initiatives of Republican Governor Tim Pawlenty were based on the Marxist principle of "from each according to his abilities, to each according to his needs." She also said the administration was attempting to govern and run centrally planned economies through the Minnesota Economic Leadership Team (MELT), an advisory board on economic and workforce policy Pawlenty chaired. Before her election to the state senate, and again in 2005, Bachmann signed a "no new taxes" pledge sponsored by the Taxpayers League of Minnesota. As a state senator, she introduced two bills that would have severely limited state taxation. In 2003, she proposed amending the Minnesota Constitution to adopt the "Taxpayers' Bill of Rights" (TABOR).

=== Environment ===
Bachmann supports increased domestic drilling of oil and natural gas, as well as pursuing renewable sources of energy such as wind and solar. She is a strong proponent of nuclear power.

Bachmann has strongly opposed the Environmental Protection Agency (EPA), pledging at an August 2011 campaign rally, "I guarantee you the EPA will have doors locked and lights turned off and they will only be about conservation." In 2007 and 2010, she actively solicited funds from the EPA on behalf of constituents in her congressional district.

=== Social Security and Medicare phase-out ===
Bachmann has called for phasing out Social Security and Medicare: "what you have to do, is keep faith with the people that are already in the system... But basically what we have to do is wean everybody else off."

=== Foreign policy ===
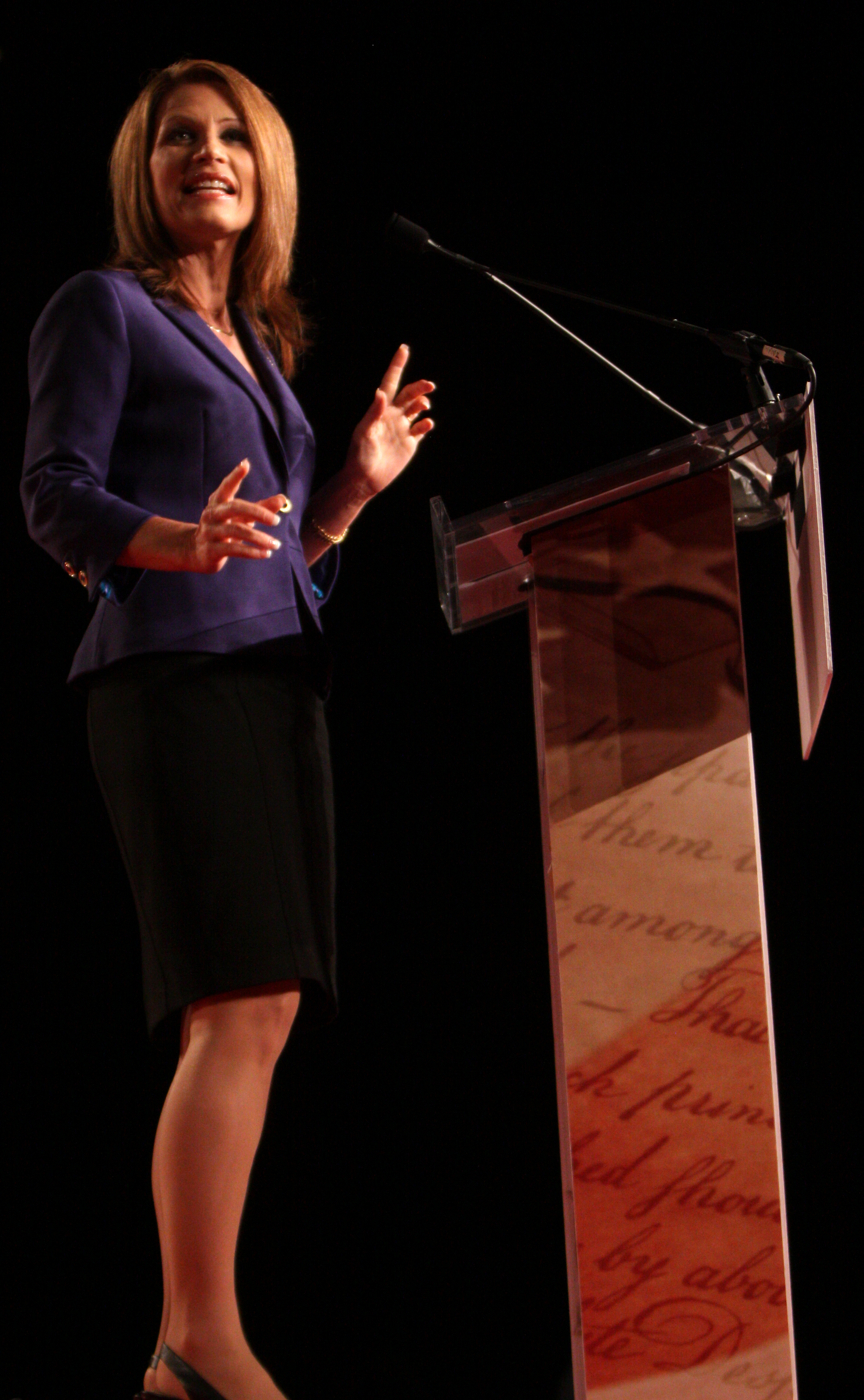
Bachmann speaking as a candidate for president in September 2011

Bachmann believes that the 2003 invasion of Iraq was justified. Bachmann has said that in dealing with Iran, diplomacy "is our option", but that other options, including a nuclear strike, should not be ruled out. She has also said that she is "a longtime supporter of Israel".

=== Global economy ===
In a discussion about the G-20 summit in Toronto, during an interview with conservative radio host Scott Hennen, Bachmann stated that she did not want America to be part of the international global economy.

Bachmann told The Wall Street Journal that Milton Friedman, Thomas Sowell and Walter Williams influenced her economic views. She said she was "an Art Laffer fiend" and loved Ludwig von Mises.

=== Immigration ===
Bachmann believes that strengthened enforcement of immigration laws is required for the growth of the American job market. She supports amending the Immigration and Nationality Act to allow only the immediate family of legal immigrants (not extended family members) priority consideration in the immigration process. She voted against the DREAM Act. She has also said the current law does not need modification but proper enforcement.

Bachmann said, "the immigration system in the United States worked very, very well up until the mid-1960s when liberal members of Congress changed the immigration laws." She has expressed support for immigration of highly skilled professionals such as chemists and engineers.

Bachmann opposed the 2013 immigration reform bill, claiming that its passage would mean the end of the Republican Party. On WorldNetDaily she said, "This is President Obama's number one political agenda because he knows we will never again have a Republican president ever if amnesty goes into effect."

=== Social issues ===
==== LGBTQ+ rights ====
Bachmann supports both federal and state constitutional amendments banning same-sex marriage and any legal equivalents. In August 2006, the Star Tribune reported that in March 2006, while on a Minneapolis radio show, Bachmann advocated a state constitutional amendment to ban same-sex marriage. A caller asked her to explain how he, a heterosexual, would be harmed if his gay neighbors were allowed to marry. Bachmann replied, "Public schools would have to teach that homosexuality and same-sex marriage are normal, natural and that maybe children should try them." The Star Tribune also reported that Bachmann had publicly called homosexuality "sexual dysfunction", "sexual identity disorders", and "personal enslavement" leading to "sexual anarchy". In her 2012 presidential election campaign, she advocated the reinstitution of Don't Ask, Don't Tell, which prohibited gay, lesbian and bisexual individuals from serving openly in the United States military.

In a July 2014 radio interview, Bachmann claimed that gay rights activists want to abolish age of consent laws in the United States so that adults can "prey on little children sexually."

In 2020, Bachmann claimed that "transgender Black Marxists" were "seeking the overthrow of the United States and the dissolution of the traditional family."

==== Abortion ====
Bachmann has identified herself as pro-life and has been endorsed in her runs for Congress by the Susan B. Anthony List and Minnesota Citizens Concerned for Life. At a New Hampshire debate among presidential candidates, when asked if abortion should be allowed in cases of rape or incest, she responded that she was "100 percent pro-life", implying that such a fetus would have to be carried to term. In the Minnesota Senate, Bachmann introduced a bill proposing a constitutional amendment restricting state funds for abortion. The bill died in committee.

=== Federal-backed home loans ===
According to The Washington Post, in 2008 Bachmann may have taken advantage of a federal program for a home loan, then called for dismantling the program, though the Post noted that the public and other members of Congress have taken advantage of such loans despite seeing reasons to criticize them. When asked about it, she said: "This is the problem. It is almost impossible to buy a home in this country today without the federal government being involved".

=== Birtherism ===
While Bachmann denied being part of the birther movement, she said that Obama could resolve the dispute by producing his long-form birth certificate. In April 2011, after Obama released the certificate, George Stephanopoulos asked Bachmann about the issue on Good Morning America. She said that its release "should settle the matter", that "I take the president at his word", and that "We have bigger fish to fry". Likely in response to these comments by Bachmann, Obama at the White House Correspondent's Dinner of 2011 said, "Michele Bachmann is here, though, I understand, and she is thinking about running for President, which is weird because I hear she was born in Canada. Yes, Michele, this is how it starts. Just letting you know."

=== Donald Trump ===
Bachmann vocally supported then-President Donald Trump, saying in 2017 that he "has had the courage and the fortitude to stand up where other Republicans wouldn't dare to stand up." She expressed support for Trump's Executive Order 13769, which banned refugees from six majority-Muslim countries. In 2019, she was one of the signatories that criticized an op-ed in Christianity Today that called for Trump to be removed from office.

In December 2020, after the presidential election, Bachmann posted a video online praying for a Trump second term. Her prayer specifically called out the contested election results in Georgia, saying:

Lord, would you deliver these races in Georgia? O Father, would you deliver various local and state races, Father, that they aren't stolen? Would you give us a true vote? And, O God, I personally ask, from myself, Michele Bachmann, Lord, would you allow Donald Trump to have a second term as president of the United States?

== Political campaigns ==
=== 2006 congressional campaign ===
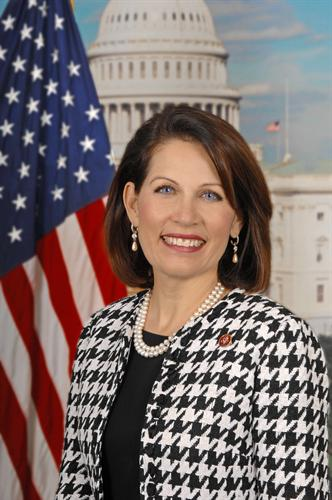
Official photo, c. 2007

Bachmann won her Congressional seat in the 2006 election with 50% of the vote, defeating the Minnesota Democratic-Farmer-Labor Party (DFL) nominee Patty Wetterling and the Independence Party's John Binkowski.

The 6th District's representative since 2001, Mark Kennedy, announced in late 2005 that he would run for the U.S. Senate seat being vacated by Mark Dayton. Bachmann said, "God then called me to run" for the U.S. House seat, and that she and her husband fasted for three days to be more sure.

According to Bloomberg.com, evangelical conservative leader James Dobson put his organization Focus on the Family's resources behind Bachmann's 2006 campaign. The group planned to distribute 250,000 voter guides in Minnesota churches to reach social conservatives, according to Tom Prichard, president of the Minnesota Family Council, a local affiliate of the group. In addition to Minnesota, Dobson's group also organized turnout drives in Pennsylvania, Maryland, Michigan, Ohio, New Jersey and Montana.

During a debate televised by WCCO-TV on October 28, 2006, news reporter Pat Kessler quoted a story that appeared in the Star Tribune and asked Bachmann whether it was true that the church she belonged to taught that the Pope is the Anti-Christ. Bachmann replied that her church "does not believe that the Pope is the Anti-Christ, that's absolutely false ... I'm very grateful that my pastor has come out and been very clear on this matter, and I think it's patently absurd and it's a false statement."

In early July 2006, Bachmann received a fundraising visit from Speaker of the House Dennis Hastert. On July 21, Karl Rove visited Minnesota to raise funds for her election. In August, President Bush was the keynote speaker at her congressional fundraiser, which raised about $500,000. Bachmann also received fundraising support from Vice President Dick Cheney. The National Republican Congressional Committee put nearly $3 million into the race, for electronic and direct-mail ads against Wetterling, significantly more than the Democratic Congressional Campaign Committee spent on Wetterling's behalf. On November 7, Bachmann won the election with 50% of the vote to Wetterling's 42% and Binkowski's 8%.

=== 2008 congressional campaign ===
In 2008 Bachmann was reelected, defeating DFL and Independence Party nominee Elwyn Tinklenberg with 46.4% of the vote to Tinklenberg's 43.4%. Because Tinklenberg was running as a DFL member in the Democratic primary, Bob Anderson was able to run in the Independence Party primary unopposed, despite not having that party's endorsement. Anderson received 10% of the vote.

=== 2010 congressional campaign ===
In 2010 Bachmann was challenged by DFL nominee Tarryl Clark and Independence Party candidate Bob Anderson. With more than $8.5 million, Bachmann spent more than any other House of Representative candidate, although Clark was able to raise $4 million, one of the largest fundraising efforts in the nation for a U.S. House challenger. On November 2, 2010, Bachmann defeated Clark, 52% to 40%.

=== 2012 presidential campaign ===
In early 2011, amid substantial speculation, Bachmann announced her candidacy for president. She participated in the second Republican presidential debate, in New Hampshire, on June 13, 2011, and during the debate announced that she had filed paperwork with the Federal Election Commission (FEC) earlier that day to become a candidate for the nomination. Bachmann formally announced her candidacy for the nomination on June 27, 2011, during an appearance in Waterloo, Iowa, her birth city.

Bachmann won the Ames Straw Poll hosted by the Iowa GOP on August 13, 2011, becoming the first woman ever to win the poll, but finished sixth in the January 3, 2012, caucuses, with 4.98% of the vote. On January 4, 2012, she canceled her scheduled campaign trips to South Carolina and suspended her campaign.

=== 2012 congressional campaign ===
On January 25, 2012, Bachmann announced that she would run for reelection for her seat in Congress.

According to Politico.com, as of July 2012 Bachmann had "raised close to $15 million" for the 2012 election, a figure it called "astounding ... more than some Senate candidates will collect this year." From July to the end of September, Bachmann raised $4.5 million. This amount put her ahead of all other members of Congress (including Allen West who was in second place with $4 million) for the third quarter. Bachmann said she was "humbled by the enormous outpouring of grassroots support for my campaign focused on keeping America the most secure and prosperous nation in the world."

Despite a more favorable district, Bachmann won reelection only narrowly, receiving just 4,298 more votes than her DFL challenger, Jim Graves.

== Other endeavors ==
=== Autobiography ===
In November 2011, Bachmann published her autobiography, Core of Conviction, in which she outlined the events and people who have shaped her values and beliefs. The book describes her break with the Democratic Party. "It was in the perilous fires of the Carter administration that my ideology was forged," she wrote. "In the seventies, Carter taught me what I was against, and then in the eighties, Reagan taught me what I was for." Reflecting on her role as a Tea Party leader, she elaborated, "I once said that the Tea Party represents 90 percent of Americans. I now realize that I misspoke. I should have said 100 percent, because I believe that nearly all Americans retain faith in the ordered liberty that the Constitution offers."

=== Businesses ===
Bachmann and her husband own a Christian counseling practice, Bachmann & Associates. The clinic is run by her husband, who has a Ph.D. with "a concentration in clinical psychology" from Union Graduate School. As of 2011, Marcus Bachmann was not a licensed clinical psychologist in Minnesota. The clinic received nearly $30,000 from Minnesota government agencies between 2006 and 2010 in addition to at least $137,000 in federal payments and $24,000 in government grants for counselor training. In an interview, Michele Bachmann said that she and her husband had not benefited at taxpayer expense, saying, "the money that went to the clinic was actually training money for employees".

Marcus Bachmann has falsely claimed that Bachmann & Associates did not provide conversion therapy, a controversial psychological treatment that has been repudiated by the American Psychological Association as unethical and without medical basis. A former client of Bachmann's clinic and a hidden camera investigator with the activist group Truth Wins Out showed that therapists at the clinic do engage in such practices. In a subsequent interview with the Star Tribune, Marcus Bachmann did not deny that he or other counselors at his clinic used the technique, but said they did so only at a client's request.

In personal financial disclosure reports for 2006 through 2009, Bachmann reported earning $32,500 to $105,000 from a farm that was owned at the time by her ailing father-in-law, Paul Bachmann. The farm received $260,000 in federal crop and disaster subsidies between 1995 and 2008. Bachmann said that in 2006–2009, her husband acted as a trustee of the farm for his dying father and so, out of "an abundance of caution", she claimed the farm as income in financial disclosures, though it was her in-laws who profited from the farm during that period.

=== Nonprofit involvement ===
According to her tax returns, Bachmann has served as director and chair of the Family Research Council, an evangelical think tank and activist group.

=== Post-congressional career ===
In a December 2017 New Year's weekend interview with televangelist Jim Bakker, Bachmann said that she was considering running in the 2018 special election for the U.S. Senate seat vacated by Al Franken but was awaiting "God's counsel" before deciding.

Since January 1, 2021, Bachmann has been dean of the Robertson School of Government at Regent University.

At the start of the Gaza war in 2023, Bachmann spoke at a Turning Point USA conference. At this conference, Bachmann called for the expulsion of the Palestinians living in the Gaza Strip, stating "So, it's time that Gaza ends. The two million people who live there – they are clever assassins. They need to be removed from that land. That land needs to be turned into a national park. And since they're the voluntary mercenaries for Iran, they need to be dropped on the doorstep of Iran. Let Iran deal with those people." In 2026, Bachmann denied the Gaza famine, saying that Gazan refugees' "calorie count is over 3,000 calories per person a day from all the food that's coming in and the biggest problem they're dealing with most recently in Gaza is obesity."

== Electoral history ==
=== Local elections ===
Minnesota State Senate, District 56 Republican Primary, 2000
Party	Candidate	Votes	%
Republican	Michele Bachmann	4,159	60.1
Republican	Gary Laidig	2,760	39.9

Minnesota State Senate, District 56 general election, 2000
Party	Candidate	Votes	%
Republican	Michele Bachmann	25,833	54.6
Democratic	Ted Thompson	21,474	42.9
Independence	Lyno Sullivan	2,714	5.4

Minnesota State Senate, District 52 Republican Primary, 2002
Party	Candidate	Votes	%
Republican	Michele Bachmann (incumbent)	2,164	100

Minnesota State Senate, District 52 general election, 2002
Party	Candidate	Votes	%
Republican	Michele Bachmann (incumbent)	21,159	54.2
Democratic	Jane Krentz	17,828	45.7

=== Congressional elections ===
==== 2006 ====
Minnesota's 6th congressional district general election, 2006
Party	Candidate	Votes	%	±%
Republican	Michele Bachmann	151,248	50.1	−3.9
Democratic	Patty Wetterling	127,144	42.1	−3.9
Independence	John Binkowski	23,557	7.80	+7.80

==== 2008 ====
Minnesota's 6th congressional district Republican primary, 2008
Party	Candidate	Votes	%
Republican	Michele Bachmann (incumbent)	19,127	85.9
Republican	Aubrey Immelman	3,134	14.1

Minnesota's 6th congressional district general election, 2008
Party	Candidate	Votes	%	±%
Republican	Michele Bachmann (incumbent)	187,817	46.4	−3.6
Democratic	Elwyn Tinklenberg	175,786	43.4	+1.3
Independence	Bob Anderson	40,643	10.0	+2.2

==== 2010 ====
Minnesota's 6th congressional district general election, 2010
Party	Candidate	Votes	%	±%
Republican	Michele Bachmann (incumbent)	159,476	52.5	+6.1
Democratic	Tarryl Clark	120,846	39.8	−3.6
Independence	Bob Anderson	17,698	5.8	−4.2
Independent	Aubrey Immelman	5,490	1.8	

==== 2012 ====
Minnesota's 6th congressional district general election, 2012
Party	Candidate	Votes	%	±%
Republican	Michele Bachmann (incumbent)	179,241	50.5	−2.0
Democratic	Jim Graves	174,944	49.3	+9.5

== Personal life ==
=== Family ===
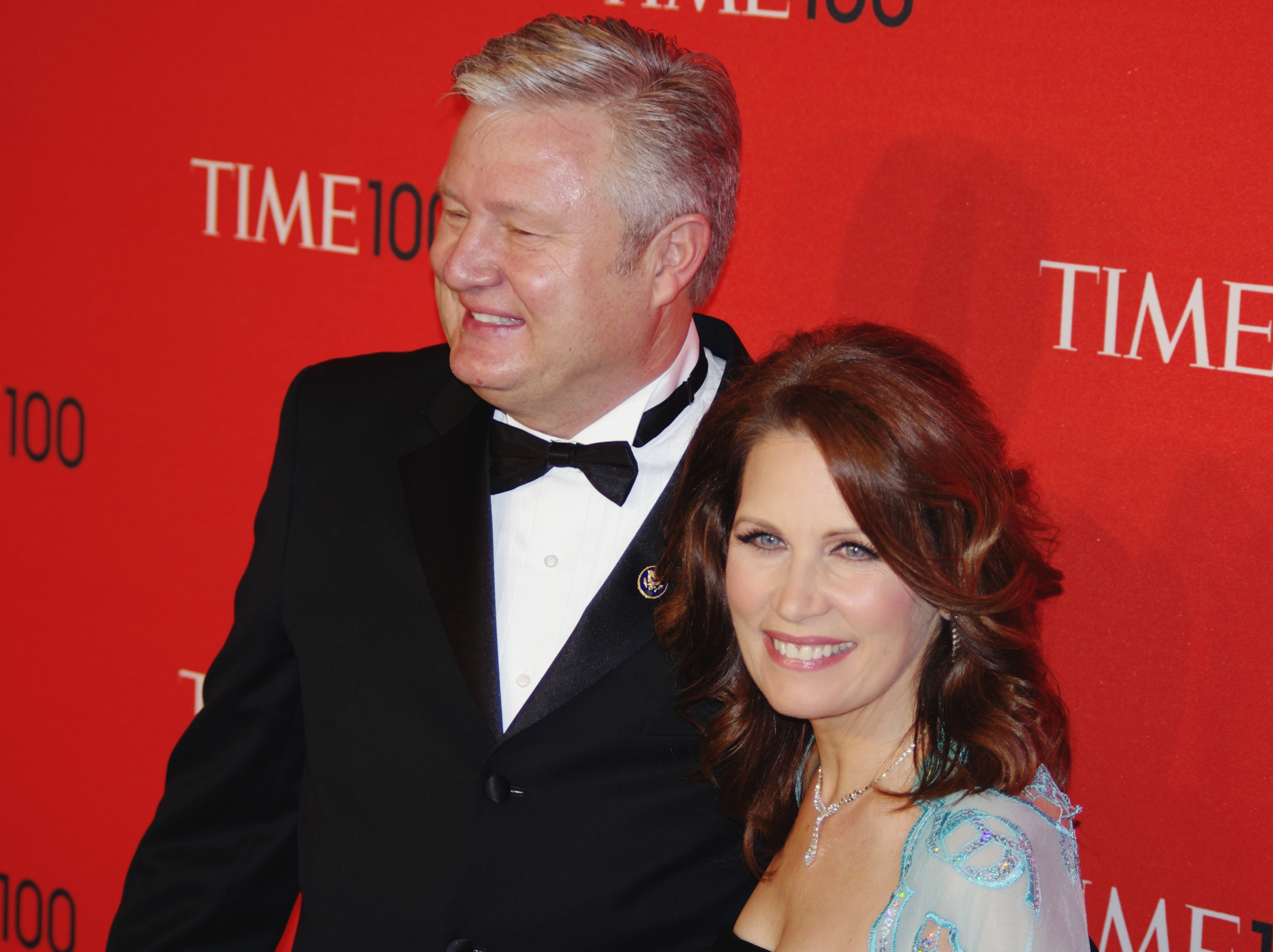
Husband Marcus Bachmann and Michele at the 2011 Time 100 gala, where Michele was an honoree

In 1978, as Michele Amble, she married Marcus Bachmann, now a clinical therapist with a master's degree from Regent University and a Ph.D. from Union Graduate School, whom she met while they were undergraduates. After she received an LL.M. in taxation from William & Mary School of Law in 1988, the couple moved to Stillwater, Minnesota, a town of 18,000 near Saint Paul, where they run a Christian counseling center that administered gay conversion therapy. Bachmann and her husband have five children: Lucas, Harrison, Elisa, Caroline, and Sophia. In a 2011 town hall meeting, she said that she suffered a miscarriage after the birth of their second child, Harrison, an event she said shaped her anti-abortion views. Bachmann later moved to Greater East Side in Saint Paul and then to West Lakeland Township. In January 2019, Bachmann sold her West Lakeland Township house for $945,000 but has remained a resident in the Eastern side of Saint Paul.

Bachmann and her husband have also provided foster care to 23 other children, all of whom were teenage girls. The Bachmanns were licensed from 1992 to 2000 to handle up to three foster children at a time, with the last arriving in 1998. The Bachmanns began by providing short-term care for girls with eating disorders who were patients in a University of Minnesota program. Their home was legally defined as a treatment home, with a daily reimbursement rate per child from the state. Some girls stayed a few months, others more than a year.

Bachmann is a former beauty pageant contestant.

=== Citizenship ===
In May 2012 it was reported that Marcus Bachmann had registered for Swiss citizenship, which, under Swiss nationality law, would make Michele and their children Swiss citizens too. Within two days of the first reports of Marcus Bachmann's dual citizenship, Michele Bachmann announced that she had written to the Swiss consulate to renounce her Swiss citizenship.

=== Religion ===
Bachmann is a former Evangelical Lutheran. She was raised in "a family of Norwegian Lutheran Democrats" and was a longtime member of Salem Lutheran Church (Wisconsin Evangelical Lutheran Synod) in Stillwater. She and her husband withdrew their membership on June 21, 2011, just before she officially began her presidential campaign. They had not attended the church for over two years. In 2011, the Bachmanns began attending Rockpoint Church in Lake Elmo, which is affiliated with the Evangelical Free Church of America.

Bachmann has cited theologian Francis Schaeffer as a "profound influence" on her life and her husband's, especially his film series How Should We Then Live?. She has also described Total Truth: Liberating Christianity from Its Cultural Captivity by Nancy Pearcey as a "wonderful" book. Journalist Ryan Lizza has argued that Bachmann's worldview is deeply influenced by the Christian movement known as Dominionism, citing the influence of Schaeffer and Pearcey as evidence. Others have criticized Lizza's article, especially its connection of Schaeffer with Dominionism. Religion writer Sarah Posner broadly concurs with Lizza, pointing to the influence of Christian Reconstructionists Herb Titus and R. J. Rushdoony on Bachmann via the curriculum at O. W. Coburn School of Law.

== See also ==
- List of female United States presidential and vice presidential candidates
- List of United States representatives from Minnesota
- Minnesota's congressional delegations
- Women in the United States House of Representatives

U.S. House of Representatives
Preceded by Mark Kennedy	Member of the U.S. House of Representatives from Minnesota's 6th congressional district 2007–2015	Succeeded by Tom Emmer
Party political offices
New office	Chair of the Tea Party Caucus; 2010–2015	Succeeded by Tim Huelskamp
U.S. order of precedence (ceremonial)
Preceded by Bill Luther as Former U.S. Representative	Order of precedence of the United States as Former U.S. Representative	Succeeded by Kevin Yoder as Former U.S. Representative
