= Rachael Denhollander =

American lawyer and activist

- Born: Rachael Joy Moxon; December 8, 1984 (age 41); Kalamazoo, Michigan, U.S.
- Education: Oak Brook College of Law and Government Policy
- Occupation: Lawyer
- Spouse: Jacob Denhollander
- Children: 4
- Awards: Arthur Ashe Courage Award (2018); Abraham Kuyper Prize for Excellence in Reformed Theology and Public Life (2021)

Rachael Joy Denhollander (née Moxon; born December 8, 1984) is an American lawyer and former gymnast. She was the first woman to publicly accuse Larry Nassar, the former Michigan State University and USA Gymnastics doctor, of sexual assault. Denhollander is 2018 Glamour Woman of the Year and was included in Time magazine's 100 Most Influential People of 2018. She is the recipient of the 2021 Abraham Kuyper Prize for Excellence in Reformed Theology and Public Life.

== Early life ==
Denhollander was born on December 8, 1984, in Kalamazoo, Michigan, to Paul and Camille Moxon. She was homeschooled and practiced gymnastics at a local club. In 2004, she coached gymnastics. She began law school at Oak Brook College of Law and Government Policy when she was 19.

== Advocacy ==
Denhollander told the MSU Police Department in August 2016, filed a Title IX complaint with the university and then shared her story of sexual abuse with the Indianapolis Star. Denhollander said Nassar sexually assaulted her when she sought treatment for lower back pain as a 15-year-old gymnast.

Denhollander came forward 16 years after Nassar first abused her, which led to a floodgate of hundreds of other women who came forward with similar allegations against him. At least seven other young women told someone about Nassar over a twenty-year period before Denhollander did likewise, but her complaint was the first to gain traction. Nassar initially denied the accusations, then admitted guilt in a plea agreement and now is imprisoned for the rest of his life. Before he was sentenced, more than 200 women gave testimonies about his abuse in two courtrooms over nine days in county courtrooms near Lansing. Denhollander was the last to speak during both of Nassar's sentencing hearings.

In asking the judges to impose the maximum sentence on Nassar, Denhollander said, "How much is a little girl worth?" She answered her own question: "These victims are worth everything ... I plead with you to impose the maximum sentence under the plea agreement because everything is what these survivors are worth." In Ingham County, Judge Rosemarie Aquilina said Denhollander "built an army of survivors" and called her "a five-star general." Aquilina also said Denhollander was "the bravest person I have ever had in my courtroom."

Denhollander has been bestowed with many honors for bringing Nassar to justice, including Time magazine naming her to its 2018 list of the world's 100 Most Influential People. On May 16, 2018, it was announced that the survivors of the USA Gymnastics sexual abuse scandal would be awarded the Arthur Ashe Courage Award. On December 12, 2018, Denhollander was announced as the winner of Sports Illustrated's Inspiration of the Year Award. Denhollander was a joint recipient of ESPN's "Arthur Ashe Courage Award," and was named "Michiganian of the Year" by Detroit News.

Denhollander said that she left her former church in Louisville, Kentucky, over her objections to its inviting speakers from Sovereign Grace Churches to preach. The leadership of her former church, Immanuel Baptist Church, issued an apology for not responding appropriately to Denhollander's concerns, saying their initial response had been "sinfully unloving."

In March 2019, Denhollander announced that she would be publishing two books – a memoir titled What Is a Girl Worth? and a children's book titled How Much Is a Little Girl Worth?. In September 2019, Tyndale published these books, plus a third, Discover Your True Worth. In March 2022, Denhollander published an additional children's book titled How Much Is a Little Boy Worth?

In 2025 evidence came to light of Denhollander having a conflict of interest in the Southern Baptist Convention's abuse invesigation, advising both individuals with abuse claims as well as the SBC itself.

== Personal life ==
In 2006, Denhollander met her husband, Jacob. Jacob is a PhD student at University of Wales Trinity Saint David. They have four children together.
