= Graham Staines =

Australian missionary killed in India (1941–1999)

- Graham Staines with his wife and children
- Born: Graham Stuart Staines; 18 January 1941; Palmwoods, Queensland, Australia
- Died: 23 January 1999 (aged 58); Keonjhar, Orissa (Odisha), India
- Cause of death: Murder by burning
- Occupation: Missionary
- Spouse: Gladys Staines
- Children: 3

Graham Stuart Staines (18 January 1941 – 23 January 1999) was an Australian Christian missionary who, along with his two sons, Philip (aged 10) and Timothy (aged 6), were killed by being burnt to death in India by members of the Bajrang Dal, a Hindutva organisation. In 2003, Bajrang Dal member Dara Singh was convicted of leading the murderers and was sentenced to life in prison.

Staines had been working in Orissa (Odisha) since 1965 as part of an evangelical missionary organisation named "Mayurbhanj Leprosy Home" caring for people who had leprosy and looking after the tribal people in the area who lived in abject poverty. However, some Hindutva groups alleged that during this time he had supposedly tricked, lured or forcibly coerced many Hindus into believing in the Christian faith. The Wadhwa Commission noted that there was no evidence of forced conversions. Staines's widow Gladys has also denied the allegation of forced conversions.

Gladys continued to live and work in India caring for those who were poor and were affected by leprosy until she returned home to Australia in 2004. In 2005, she was awarded the fourth highest civilian honour of India, the Padma Shree, in recognition for her work in Orissa. In 2016, she received the Mother Teresa Memorial International Award for Social Justice.

== Early life and early career ==
Graham Staines was born in the Sunshine Coast suburb of Palmwoods in the Australian state of Queensland. He visited India for the first time in 1965 by joining the Evangelical Missionary Society of Mayurbhanj (EMSM), and worked in the remote tribal areas of Orissa, a state with a long history of Christian missionary work. He took over the management of the Mission at Baripada in 1983 after helping to establish the Mayurbhanj Leprosy Home as a registered society in 1982.

== Personal life ==
Staines met Gladys in June 1981, while they worked together taking care of leprosy patients on the mission field. Not too long after that they decided to get married, in 1983; they worked together until his death. Together they had three children: a daughter, Esther, and two sons, Philip and Timothy. During the course of his work Staines had managed to assist in the translation of part of the Bible into the language of the Ho people of India, which included his crosschecking the work with the entire manuscript of the New Testament, though it is largely believed his main focus was on his ministry to the lepers. It was reported that he could speak the Odia language fluently, and was popular among the patients whom he had managed to cure. In addition to this it was also reported that he used to teach people how to make mats and baskets out of rope, sabai grass (Eulaliopsis binata) and tree leaves.

== Murder ==
On 22 January 1999, Staines attended a jungle camp in Manoharpur, which was an annual gathering for Christians in the area to congregate for a conference and discuss their beliefs in a social setting. The camp was on the border between the tribal villages of Mayurbhanj and Keonjhar. He was travelling to Kendujhar with his sons, who were on a break from their schooling in Ooty, a hill station in Tamil Nadu. At a point, they decided to take a break from the journey towards the jungle camp, and elected to spend the night in Manoharpur, sleeping in the vehicle due to the severe cold at the time. His wife and daughter did not accompany them on the journey, having decided to remain behind in the town and municipality of Baripada.

A mob of about fifty people, armed with axes and other implements, attacked the vehicle while Staines and his sons were fast asleep, and set the station wagon alight, trapping them inside and burning them to death. Current BJP MP Pratap Chandra Sarangi was also believed to be a part of this murder as he was Orissa State Unit Chief of the Bajrang Dal during this planned murder.

Staines and his sons had awakened and apparently tried to escape but were prevented from doing so by the angry mob of vigilantes.

=== Reactions ===
The murders were widely condemned by religious and civic leaders of the time, along with politicians and journalists.

The US-based Human Rights Watch group accused the Indian government of failing to prevent violence against Christians, and for exploiting the sectarian tensions that existed at the time for their own political gain.

Then Prime Minister of India, Atal Bihari Vajpayee condemned the "ghastly attack," and called for swift action in catching the killers.

Published reports stated that the church leaders alleged the attacks were carried out at the behest of Hindutva organisations seeking revenge for what they perceived to be forced conversions of the tribal poor into Christianity. Dara Singh, who was convicted of the murders, was treated as a hero by the supporters of Hindutva and the Bajrang Dal and reportedly protected by some villagers. In an interview with the Hindustan Times, one of the accused killers, Mahendra Hembram, stated that the killers "were provoked by the 'corruption of tribal culture' by the missionaries, who they claimed fed villagers beef, and gave the women brassieres and sanitary towels."

In her affidavit before the commission on the death of her husband and both sons, Gladys Staines stated:

The Lord God is always with me to guide me and to help me try to accomplish the work of Graham, but I sometimes wonder why Graham was killed, and what also made his assassins behave in such a brutal manner on the night of the 22nd/23rd of January 1999. ... It is far from my mind to punish the persons who were responsible for the death of my husband Graham and my two children. But it is my desire and hope that they would repent and be reformed.

== Supreme Court of India judgement ==
A trial (sessions) court in Bhubaneswar, the capital of Orissa, sentenced the convicted ringleader of the mob, Dara Singh, to death by hanging for killing Staines and his two sons. In 2005, the Orissa High Court commuted the sentence to life imprisonment. The Supreme Court upheld the High Court decision on 21 January 2011.

"In the case on hand, though Graham Staines and his two minor sons were burnt to death while they were sleeping inside a station wagon at Manoharpur, the intention was to teach a lesson to Graham Staines about his religious activities, namely, converting poor tribals to Christianity. All these aspects have been correctly appreciated by the High Court and modified the sentence of death into life imprisonment with which we concur." the court declared. The Court stated, "Our concept of secularism is that the State will have no religion. The State shall treat all religions and religious groups equally and with equal respect without in any manner interfering with their individual right of religion, faith and worship." The Court also said, "It is undisputed that there is no justification for interfering in someone's belief by way of 'use of force', provocation, conversion, incitement or upon a flawed premise that one religion is better than the other".

Dismissing the Central Bureau of Investigation's plea for sentencing Singh to death, a Bench of Justice P. Sathasivam and Justice B. S. Chauhan endorsed the Orissa High Court's finding that his crime did not fall under the rarest of rare category. In its 76-page judgement, the court came out strongly against the practice of conversion. However, four days later, on 25 January 2011, the Supreme Court of India, in a rare move, expunged its own comments with regards to conversions from its verdict. This was perhaps done due to severe criticism from the media. Leading editors, media groups, and civil society members from across the country signed a statement taking strong exception to the Supreme Court's observation that the killing of Graham Staines and his two minor children was intended to teach the Australian missionary a lesson for preaching and practising conversion.

== In popular culture ==
In the Tamil film Ramanaa (2002), the protagonist's neighbour (played by Theni Kunjarammal) reveals to Devaki (Ashima Bhalla) that the parents and two younger brothers of one of Ramanaa's (Vijayakanth) adopted daughters (played by Amanda Deal) were burnt in a van in North India. This is a loose allusion to the incident.

The Least of These: The Graham Staines Story, an American film about the real incident, was released in 2019.

== See also ==
- Hindu terrorism
- Right-wing terrorism
