= Gladys Staines =

Christian missionary in India

Gladys Staines (born c. 1951) is the widow of Australian missionary Graham Staines. Graham Staines was burnt alive along with their two sons Philip (aged 10) and Timothy (aged 7) by a mob led by the Bajrang Dal member Dara Singh in Odisha, India on 22 January 1999.

Shortly after the sentencing of the killers, Staines issued a statement saying that she had forgiven the killers and had no bitterness towards them. Rather than return to Australia, Staines "decided to stay in India where she and her husband had served lepers for 15 years", keeping her daughter Esther, with her, stating: "I cannot just leave those people who love and trust us. I have high regard for the people of India and their tolerance."

In 2004, Christianity Today described this woman as "the best-known Christian in India after Mother Teresa." In 2005, she was awarded the Padma Shri, a civilian award from the Government of India. As a result of the contributions earned from receiving that award, Staines transformed the leper house she served at into a full hospital. The hospital is named Graham Staines Memorial Hospital, established in 2004. In November 2015, Staines was awarded the Mother Teresa Memorial Award for Social Justice and after receiving the award, she stated "I thank God for his help in enabling me to carry out the work in caring for people with leprosy, even after my husband was killed."
