= Oak Brook College of Law and Government Policy =

Correspondence law school in California, United States

Coordinates: 36.85135°N 119.78342°W

- Established: 1994
- School type: Unaccredited Law School
- Location: Fresno, CA, US
- Website: www.obcl.edu

Oak Brook College of Law is a correspondence law school in Fresno, California. It is not accredited but is registered with the State Bar of California and authorized to grant the degree of Juris Doctor. Graduates are therefore able to take the bar exam in California but may not be able to do so in other states.

== History ==
It was started in 1994 to "train individuals who desire to advance the gospel of Jesus Christ through service as advocates of truth, counselors of reconciliation, and ministers of justice in the fields of law and government policy."

The school's ties go back to the controversial Institute in Basic Life Principles and founder Bill Gothard. Oak Brook was originally called "Legal Training Institute of America" (a name similar to other IBLP programs) and some of its material under the original name is still available from IBLP's online store.

== Notable alumni ==
- Rachael Denhollander - First former gymnast to file a complaint against convicted serial child sex offender Larry Nassar
- John William Loudon - former Missouri senator and representative
- Josiah Magnuson - South Carolina state representative
- Andrew Matthews - Minnesota state senator
- Mark Meuser - 2022 U.S. Senate candidate from California

== Notable faculty emeritus ==
- John Eidsmoe - constitutional scholar
