= John Eidsmoe =

American legal scholar

Col., Dr. John Allen Eidsmoe
- Born: October 18, 1945 (age 80)
- Allegiance: United States
- Branch: United States Air Force; Alabama State Defense Force
- Rank: Colonel (Alabama State Defense Force)
- Alma mater: St. Olaf College (B.A.); Lutheran Brethren Seminary (M.Div.); Dallas Theological Seminary (M.A.); University of Iowa (J.D.); Oral Roberts University (D.Min.)
- Spouse: Marlene Eidsmoe
- Children: 3

John A. Eidsmoe is an American attorney and professor of law emeritus. He has previously taught at the Thomas Goode Jones School of Law at Faulkner University in Montgomery, Alabama, the O. W. Coburn School of Law at Oral Roberts University (ORU), and at Oak Brook College of Law and Government Policy. He was in the US Air Force as a lieutenant colonel and is an Alabama State Defense Force colonel, headquarters judge advocate, deputy chaplain and training officer. He earned his J.D. from the University of Iowa, M.A. from Dallas Theological Seminary, M. Div. from Lutheran Brethren Seminary and D. Min. from ORU.

In a 2001 interview, Eidsmoe said, "When Biblical law conflicted with American law, ORU students were generally taught that 'the first thing you should try to do is work through legal means and political means to get it changed." In his 1987 book, Christianity and the Constitution, Eidsmoe wrote that America "was and to a large extent still is a Christian nation" and that "our culture should be permeated with a distinctively Christian flavoring".

Eidsmoe has stirred some controversy in his outside lecturing. In 2005, he spoke to the national convention of the Council of Conservative Citizens and in 2010 he addressed an event commemorating Alabama's Secession Day where he told an interviewer that it was Alabama's "constitutional right to secede" and that "Jefferson Davis and John C. Calhoun understood the Constitution better than did Abraham Lincoln and Daniel Webster". In April 2010, he was disinvited from a Tea Party rally in Wausau, Wisconsin, because of these statements and appearances. Eidsmoe said in 2011 that he deeply despises racism, but that he will "speak to anyone".

The congresswoman and presidential candidate Michele Bachmann described Eidsmoe as "one of the professors who had a great influence on me", "a wonderful man" and "absolutely brilliant". She worked for him while a law student at Oral Roberts as a research assistant on Christianity and the Constitution. In 2011, he said he felt Bachmann's views were in agreement with those taught at ORU and expressed in his book that she worked on.

Eidsmoe is, as of 2023, the senior counsel and resident scholar at the Foundation for Moral Law in Montgomery, Alabama. He is also an adjunct faculty member of the Institute of Lutheran Theology, in Brookings, South Dakota.

== Publications ==
- God & Caesar: Christian Faith & Political Action (1984)
- The Christian Legal Advisor (1984)
- Christianity and the Constitution: The Faith of Our Founding Fathers (1987)
- Basic Principles of New Age Thought (1991)
- Columbus & Cortez, Conquerors for Christ (1992)
- Gays and Guns: The Case Against Homosexuals in the Military (1993)
- Loyal Opposition: A Christian Response to the Clinton Agenda (1993)
- Historical and Theological Foundations of Law Volume I: Ancient Wisdom (2012)
- Historical and Theological Foundations of Law Volume II: Classical and Medieval (2012)
- Historical and Theological Foundations of Law Volume III: Reformation and Colonial (2012)
