= Dara Singh (Bajrang Dal) =

Indian serial killer

- Rabindra Kumar Pal
- Born: Rabindra Kumar Pal; October 2, 1962 (age 64); Kakor Village, Etawah district, Uttar Pradesh
- Organization: Bajrang Dal
- Known for: Murder of Graham Staines
- Political party: BJP
- Movement: Cow Protection Movement
- Parent: Mihilal Pal
- Motive: Religious Nationalism
- Criminal charge: Murder

Details
- Victims: Graham Staines and multiple others
- Date apprehended: January 31, 2000

Dara Singh (born Rabindra Kumar Pal; 2 October 1962) is an Indian convicted murderer and a member of the Bajrang Dal, an Indian militant Hindutva organisation. He was convicted for leading a mob and setting fire to the station wagon in which the Australian Christian missionary Graham Staines and his two sons were asleep, burning them all alive, in Orissa.

Singh had been convicted in the murder of Muslim trader Shaikh Rehman, severing his arms before setting him on fire at Padiabeda village in Karanjia sub-division of Mayurbhanj district. Singh was also convicted of the murder of a Christian priest, Fr. Arul Das, in Jamboni village in the same district. The priest was killed by an arrow during his escape, after his church was set on fire.

Singh was arrested after a year-long chase in January 2000 after the murders of Graham Staines and his sons, and is now serving his life sentence in prison.

== Early life ==
Dara Singh was born as Rabindra Kumar Pal, the son of Mihilal Pal of Kakor Village, Etawah district in Uttar Pradesh. He has an elder brother who was employed in the National Thermal Power Corporation and four married sisters. He has a first-class degree in arts and is also well-versed in Hindi. He stayed at Delhi for a brief period of time where he worked in a grocery business. In 1989, he moved to Maliposhi in Orissa, after he got a job as a Hindi teacher at a local School.

== Political life ==
Dara Singh was a member of the Bharatiya Janata Party (BJP). He was also an activist of the Bajrang Dal and the Vishva Hindu Parishad (VHP). The Police reported that Dara Singh was an active member of the Go suraksha samiti, an initiative financed and implemented by the VHP and the Bajrang Dal. Singh was also involved in the BJP and known to have campaigned for the party during the 1998 elections and also been involved in Rashtriya Swayamsevak Sangh (RSS) rallies and camps. Singh was also alleged to have worked for the BJP during the 1991 elections in Patna. According to the Government council, Dara Singh attended RSS camps, he professed to be a Bajrang Dal activist and believed in the strong propagation of Hindutva.

== Criminal activities ==
Dara Singh's base of operations was the relatively affluent Padiabeda village in Mayurbhanj district Singh was involved in the cow protection movement of the Bajrang Dal and targeted Muslim cattle traders.

Because cow slaughter is banned in Orissa, Dara Singh often intercepted trucks transporting cows to West Bengal, releasing the animals and setting the trucks on fire. All his targets were Muslim truck drivers. He redistributed the cows to the local people; in this way he achieved a degree of popularity among the tribal people and became a political figure. Some of the villagers gave him shelter after he was on the run for more than a year during the Graham Staines case. He had a small loyal band that was increasingly involved in violent opposition to what they perceived as anti-Hindu forces.

In September 1998, a cattle truck was looted and torched, and the trucker's assistant, Shaikh Imam was beaten to death in Godabhanga Ghati in the Mayurbhanj district. Singh was charged in this case and eventually acquitted in October 2006 due to lack of sufficient evidence and hostile witnesses.

In September 1999 Arul Das, a Catholic priest, was shot and killed with an arrow in Jamabani village in Mayurbhanj district by a gang led by Dara Singh; Das was fleeing the building, which had been set on fire. In September 2007 Singh was convicted and sentenced to life imprisonment, along with associates Chena Hao, Rajkishore Mohanta, and Jadunath Mohanta.

On 26 November 1999 more than 20 men armed with machetes attacked Shaikh Rahman, a Muslim garment merchant, in Padiabeda village, beating him and severing his hands. His body was then set alight and incinerated to prevent his family members from recovering it, and his garment stall was also set on fire. Singh and his associate Buluram Mohanty were indicted in connection with this killing. In October 2007, Singh was convicted of the murder and was sentenced to life imprisonment, while the 23 others were acquitted on grounds of insufficient evidence.

== Murder of Graham Staines ==
On 22 January 1999, at Manoharpur village in Keonjhar district, Orissa, a mob led by Dara Singh attacked Graham Staines's station wagon with Staines and his two sons, Philip (aged 10) and Timothy (aged 6), inside. Chanting "Jai Bajarang Bali", the mob set fire to the station wagon and all three were burned to death. Dara Singh does not appear to have used any legal remedy against being troubled by any of Staines's activities that would have provoked him into killing the missionary and his young sons. Other perpetrators in the killing included Bhimasen Mahanta, Rajat Das and Mahendra Hembram. The Central Bureau of Investigation had charged a total of 18 persons in the case in June 1999. Of those formally sentenced to life imprisonment, only Hembram was acquitted In September 2003, the Khordha Sessions Court sentenced Dara Singh to death for his role in the murders.

Subsequent to his arrest, Singh's supporters formed several organisations, including Dara Singh Parijan Suraksha Samiti (Council for Aiding the Family of Dara Singh), Dharmarakhyak Sri Dara Singh Bachao Samiti (Committee to defend Dara Singh, the Protector of our Dharma), and Dara Sena (Dara's Army), claiming to espouse his cause. These groups describe him as the saviour of Hinduism. There was also a "Free Dara Singh" website. Several small booklets with titles like Mono Ku Chhui Gola (He Has Touched Our Hearts), or Mu Dara Singh Kahuchi (This is Dara Singh Speaking), eulogising Singh and criticising the activities of Staines and other Christian missionaries, were circulated in the region.

The Wadhwa Commission (led by Justice D. P. Wadhwa, a sitting judge of the Supreme Court of India), stated that the Bajrang Dal was not involved in the murder of Staines, justifying its non-examination of the role of the Bajrang Dal on the grounds that the Dal was a peaceful and legal organization. Wadhwa cleared Staines of allegations that he had forcibly converted locals. However, the National Commission for minorities (NCM) disputed the commission's finding and highlighted Singh's connections with the Bajrang Dal. The NCM also suggested that the killers were from Bajrang Dal, because the attackers chanted "long live the Bajrang Dal" before the attacks. Wadhwa condemned Dara Singh, but exonerated Bajrang Dal, the RSS and the BJP for providing the intellectual motivation and sustenance for the crime to be cold-bloodedly carried out.

== Arrest ==
At least 11 squads of a special task force of the state police constantly patrolled some of the toughest jungle terrains of Mayurbhanj-Keonjhar region for over a year in search of him after the Staines murder. He always had the support of the local tribal people and was always on the move. The police and CBI put a bounty of ₹8 lakhs on his head, but this did not help. The police started "Operation Confinement" to confine Singh and cut off his escape roads in the jungle. The police arrested Dara Singh after a year-long chase on the night of 31 January 2000.Graham Staines

== Court verdicts ==
On 5 April 2003 Dayanidhi Patra (one of the accused) told the court that he was present at the time Dara Singh set fire to Staines's wagon. On 22 September 2003 the trial court convicted all the accused and sentenced them to various jail terms, except Dara Singh who was given the death penalty.

In May 2005 the Orissa High Court set aside the death sentence, stating that it could not be demonstrated that any specific action by Singh himself had caused the deaths.

In August 2005 Singh filed a special leave petition with the Supreme Court, seeking acquittal. He asserted that his case was based on hearsay and circumstantial evidence, claiming that he had not led the killings. The Supreme Court allowed his appeal in October 2005. In February 2007, Singh petitioned the Supreme Court to release him on bail, stating that he was the primary livelihood earner in his family, including his dependent 75-year-old mother; but in October 2007 the Supreme Court denied his petition.

On 19 March 2007 the Supreme Court issued notice to the CBI on a petition filed by Mahendra Hembram challenging the Orissa High Court verdict, citing his confessional statement before the trial court, in which he had said that he killed Graham Staines, should be considered in total.

On 21 January 2011 the Supreme Court upheld the Orissa High Court's life imprisonment sentence for Dara Singh and his accomplice Mahender Hembram. The Supreme Court dismissed the CBI's call for the death penalty, explaining that the death penalty could only be imposed in the "rarest of rare" cases.

On 10 July 2024, Singh requested a reduction in his sentence at the Supreme Court and he said that he was remorseful of his crimes.
