= Andrew Matthews (author) =

Australian speaker and author (born 1957)

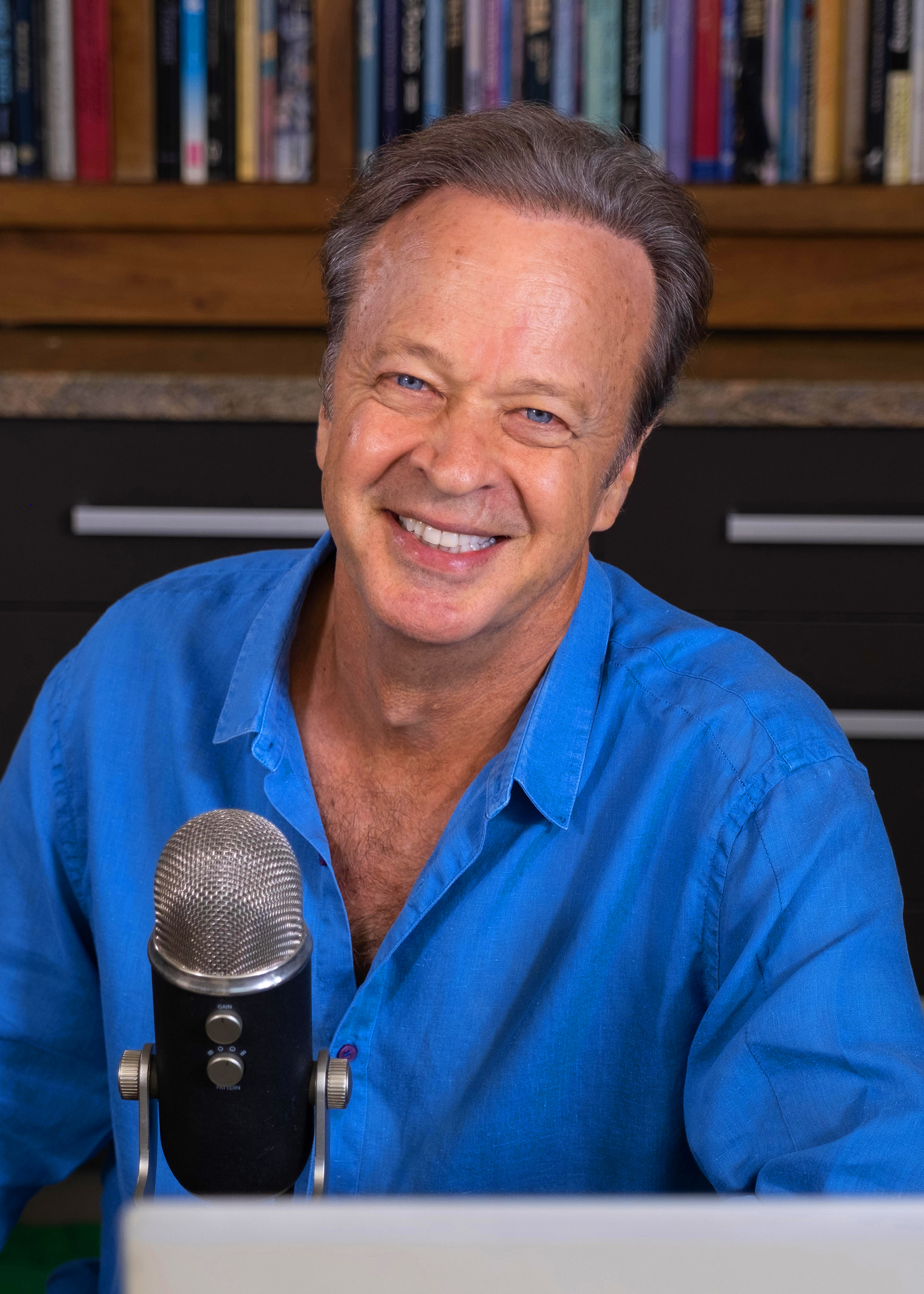
- Born: November 4, 1957 (age 68); Victor Harbor, South Australia
- Occupation: Author
- Writing career
- Language: English
- Genre: Self Help
- Notable work: "Being Happy!"
- Website: andrewmatthews.com

Andrew Matthews (born November 4, 1957) is an Australian speaker and author known for his numerous self help books.

Matthews was born in Victor Harbor, South Australia. He became a full-time writer in 1988, and since then he has written and illustrated 11 books. His book Being Happy! was written and published in 1988. It has sold 7 million copies and been published in 42 languages.

A translation of Andrew Matthews's 1990 book Making Friends by pro-democracy leader Kyaw Min Yum (also known as Ko Jimmy) became a hit in Myanmar – "due more to the subtext of individual freedoms than the actual advice of how to garner new pals."
