= Andrew Mathews (politician) =

American politician

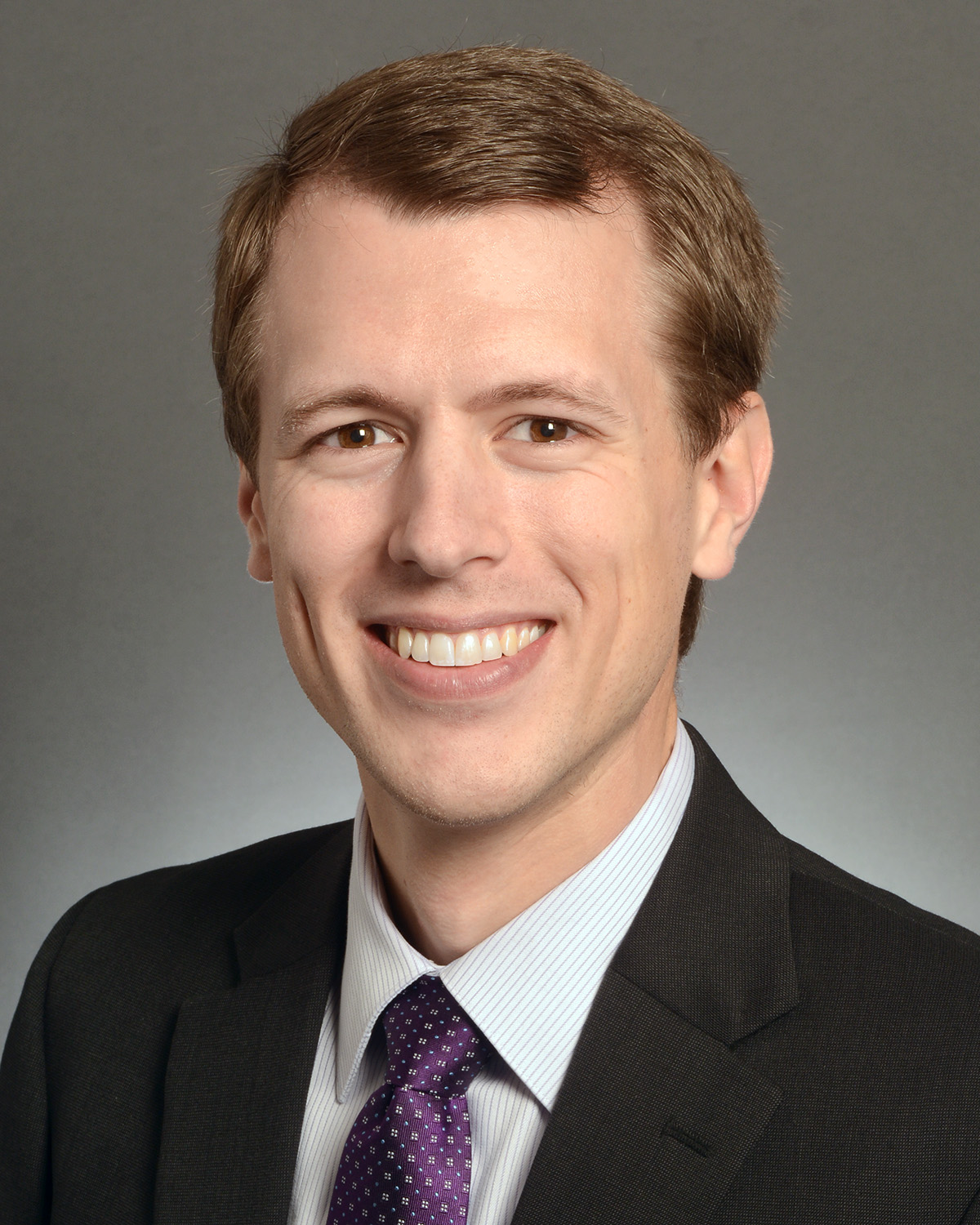

Member of the Minnesota Senate
- Incumbent
- Assumed office January 3, 2017
- Preceded by: Dave Brown
- Constituency: 15th district (2017-2023); 27th district (2023-present)

Personal details
- Born: 1987 (age 38–39)
- Party: Republican
- Education: Oak Brook College of Law
- Occupation: pastor, caseworker

Andrew Mathews is an American politician and member of the Minnesota Senate. A member of the Republican Party of Minnesota, he represents District 27 in east-central Minnesota.

== Education and career ==
Mathews graduated with a Juris Doctor from Oak Brook College of Law, an unaccredited correspondence school. He is a pastor and works as a congressional veterans' caseworker, assisting military veterans with benefits and services.

== Minnesota Senate ==
Mathews was elected to the Minnesota Senate in 2016.

== Personal life ==
Mathews is married with two children and lives in Princeton, Minnesota.
