= Cannabis political parties of Minnesota =

Minnesota cannabis political party history

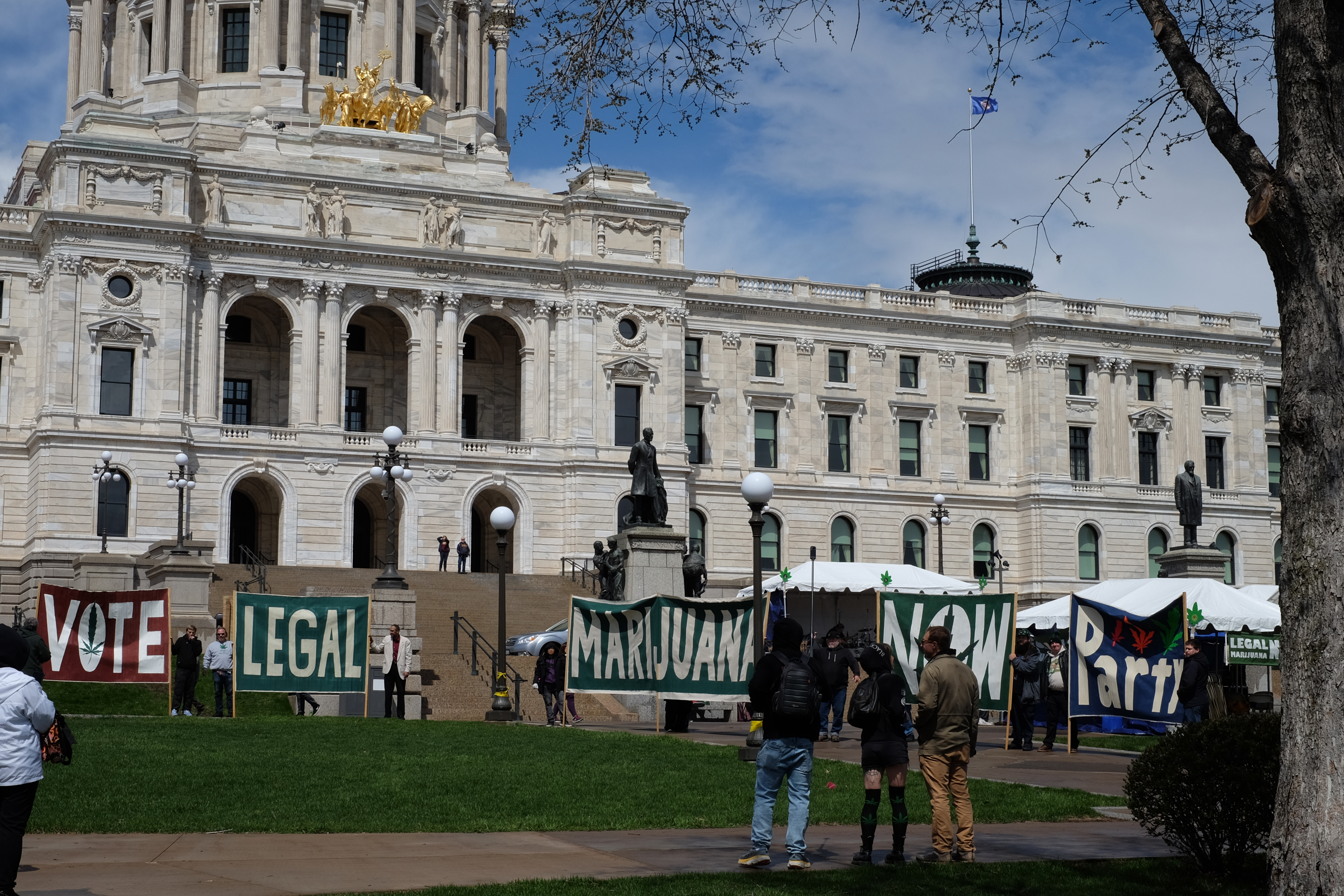
Legal Marijuana Now Party at the Minnesota State Capitol, 2023

Cannabis political parties of Minnesota include the Grassroots–Legalize Cannabis Party, the Independence Party, and the Legal Marijuana Now! Party. Also, both the Libertarian Party and the Green Party advocate for the legalization of marijuana.

Other Minnesota cannabis political parties that were active in the past have included the Grassroots Party, Independent Grassroots, and the Reform Party. Marijuana political party organizations have operated in Minnesota's counties and United States congressional districts.

Modern state cannabis parties are typically single-issue political parties, with histories dating back to the 1960s, across Minnesota. More broadly, the category of cannabis political parties can also include other parties that advocate for marijuana law reform. Reacting to cannabis parties in 2024 Ken Martin, chairman of the state Democratic Party, stated that the D–F–L is the party that legalized cannabis in Minnesota.

== Objectives and results ==
Reform Party nominee Jesse Ventura was elected Governor of Minnesota in a three-way race between a Republican candidate and a Democratic candidate, in 1998, championing a platform which included cannabis legalization. Ventura served as Minnesota governor until 2003.

The Minnesota Legal Marijuana Now! Party nominee for United States Senator received 190,000 votes, more than any other such third-party candidate in the nation in 2020.

2022 State Auditor nominee Tim Davis, who was Legal Marijuana Now! Party's chair at the time, qualified for a $28,000 portion of Minnesota's elections funding intended to help regular Minnesotans run for office by meeting a $6000 fundraising requirement before the summer deadline and reporting all his campaign income and expenditures transparently. Davis used the public subsidy to print and distribute pro-marijuana legalization campaign fliers door to door, across the state. Davis received 87,000 votes in the November 2022 election.

Minnesota state marijuana parties were credited with motivating the Democratic Party to prioritize cannabis legalization, in Minnesota, in 2023.

Minnesota Legal Marijuana Now! Party chairperson Dennis Schuller, who was 2020 LMN Party State Representative nominee, told a reporter in 2023 that ending federal prohibition laws against cannabis, overseeing implementation of the state's regulated market and expungement of past criminal records, were goals that remain for Legal Marijuana Now! Party in its ongoing Minnesota campaign.

== History ==
=== Early years ===
The Youth International Party was established in 1967 to advance the counterculture of the 1960s. The YIP flag is a five-pointed star superimposed with a cannabis leaf. Without formal membership or hierarchy, the Yippie movement spread across America, and into other nations. Yippies tailored colorful, theatrical acts exploiting mass media, which included political pie throwing, in 1969 and 1970. Youth International Party, known for their sense of humor, direct actions and satirical, elaborate pranks, ran Nobody for President in 1976, with the slogan "Nobody's perfect!" YIP organized marijuana "smoke-ins" across North America through the 1970s and into the 1980s.

=== Grassroots–Legalize Cannabis Party ===
The Grassroots–Legalize Cannabis Party was founded in Minnesota, in 2014. The group was established by Oliver Steinberg who together with others, Tim Davis, Derrick Grimmer, and Chris Wright, had previously founded the Grassroots Party of Minnesota. Grassroots–Legalize Cannabis Party attained ballot qualified status in Minnesota when, in 2018, their Attorney General candidate, who dropped out of the race to support the Democratic candidate but whose name remained on ballots, received 5.7 percent of the vote. Steinberg, who was 2020 G—LC Party nominee for U.S. Senator, wrote in Star Tribune, "cannabis prohibition never was necessary; always was unjust and unjustifiable; and always lacked moral authority because it was actually designed to serve as a legal mechanism for racial repression." In January, 2023, Steinberg told the Minnesota Senate Public Safety Committee that marijuana prohibition has not kept people from using the drug, but has "succeeded perhaps in terrorizing or intimidating citizens, in canceling civil liberties, blighting both urban and rural communities, all without eradicating the outlawed substance." Grassroots—Legalize Cannabis Party became inactive after 2023.

=== Grassroots Party ===
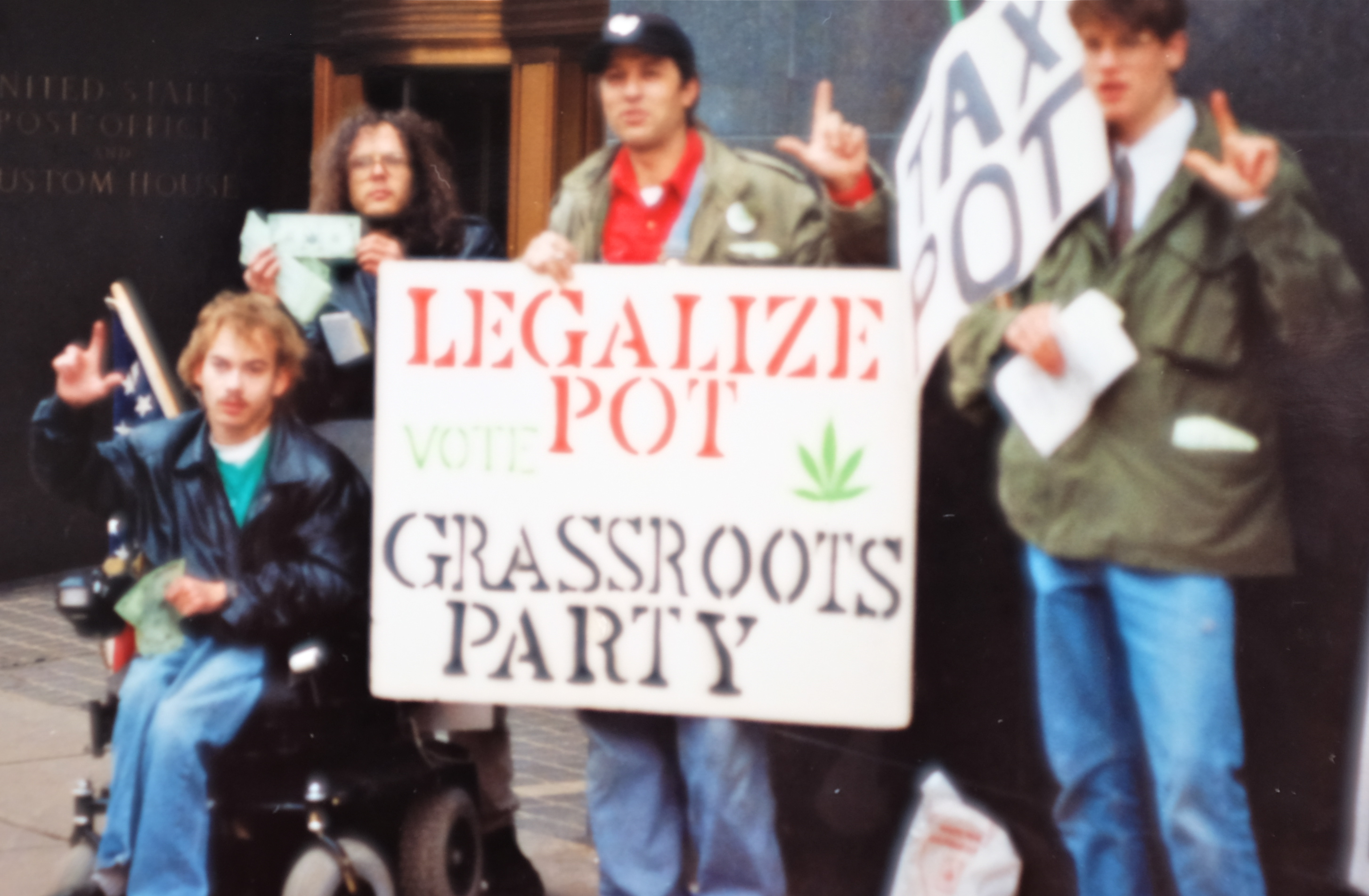
Grassroots Party activists in Downtown Saint Paul, 1991

The Grassroots Party, founded in Minnesota in 1986, often ran candidates for state and federal offices. During the 1990s Grassroots Party expanded into Iowa and Vermont. Jack Herer, author of The Emperor Wears No Clothes, was Grassroots Party presidential nominee in 1988, and 1992. GRP nominated businessman Dennis Peron, who in 1991 opened the San Francisco Cannabis Buyers Club, America's first public cannabis shop, to run for president in 1996. Three Vermont Grassroots candidates won five percent or more of the popular vote in the 1996 elections, qualifying the GRP for ballot access, in Vermont, from 1998 through 2002. Russell Bentley, a Grassroots nominee for US Senate in 1990 and U.S. Congress in 1992 and Minnesota Grassroots Party board member, was arrested on marijuana smuggling charges in 1996. Bentley was sentenced to five years in federal prison. In 2000, Minnesota GRP nominated Minneapolis playwright David Daniels as candidate for U.S. Senate. Daniels received 21,447 votes.

=== Independence Party ===
In 2000, Minnesota businessman John Birrenbach, a U.S. Navy veteran known to supporters as "Hemp John," was Independence Party nominee in the District 65B Minnesota House of Representatives election. In 2014, Independence Party of Minnesota nominated a slate of candidates who supported cannabis legalization, including a Minnesota NORML board member, 32 year old attorney Brandan Borgos. Independence Party merged with the Alliance Party of Minnesota, in 2020, becoming the Independence-Alliance Party.

=== Independent Grassroots ===
In 1996 the Minnesota Grassroots Party split, forming Independent Grassroots for one election cycle. John Birrenbach was the Independent Grassroots Party U.S. presidential nominee and George McMahon was their vice-presidential nominee.

=== Legal Marijuana Now! Party ===
In 1998, members of Independent Grassroots formed the Legal Marijuana Now Party. According to LMN Party, a person's right to sell the products of their garden is protected by the Minnesota Constitution. In 2014, the Legal Marijuana Now candidate for Attorney General got 3 percent, qualifying the party to be officially recognized and to receive state funding. In 2018, the LMN Party nominee for State Auditor got 5 percent, earning Minnesota Legal Marijuana Now Party automatic ballot access. In 2020, the LMN candidate for U.S. Senator received 190,154 votes, more than any other such third-party candidate in the nation, retaining ballot access for the party through 2024. Legal Marijuana Now Party expanded into Nebraska, in 2021, by collecting the signatures of 6,800 Nebraska voters. Paula Overby, who had previously been 2020 Legal Marijuana Now District 2 nominee and was nominated by LMN Party to run for U.S. Representative from Minnesota's 2nd congressional district in 2022, died three weeks before the election. Under state law, Overby's name remained on the ballot and Overby got 10,728 votes, in 2022.

=== Reform Party ===
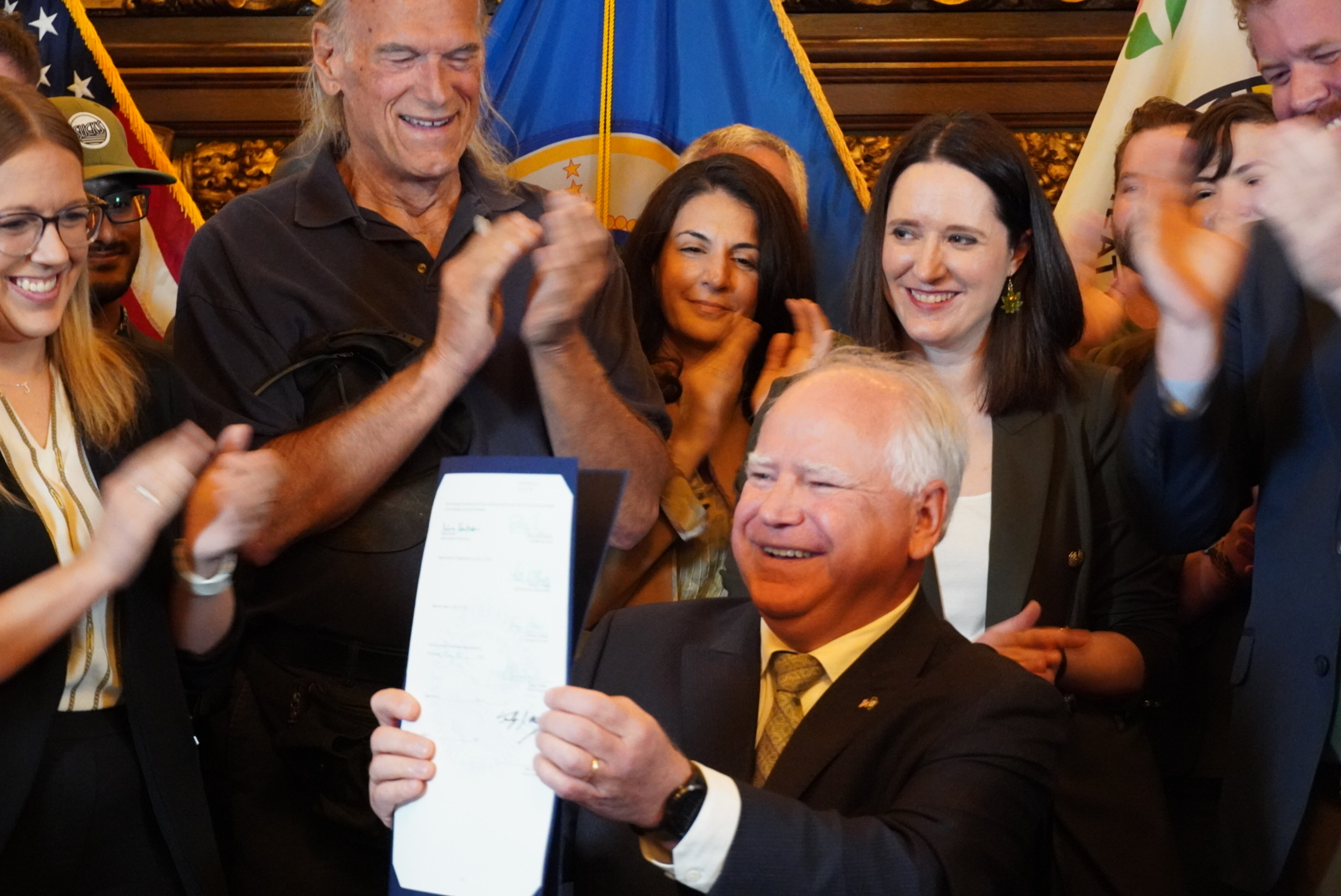
Former Reform Party Governor Jesse Ventura at the signing of Minnesota's recreational cannabis law by Governor Tim Walz in 2023

During the 1998 gubernatorial election in Minnesota, Reform Party nominee Jesse Ventura was interviewed about cannabis legalization for the November, 1998 issue of High Times. Ventura discussed the economic advantages of industrial hemp products and benefits of medical marijuana in the interview, on newsstands as voters headed into the polls. Ventura was elected in a three-way race between a Republican candidate and a Democratic candidate, and served as Minnesota Governor from 1999 through 2003. The Reform Party of Minnesota changed their name to Independence Party, in 2000.

== Electoral activity ==
=== District 1 ===
The 1st Congressional District Legal Marijuana Now Party nominated Richard Reisdorf of Mankato, a disabled American war veteran, to run for United States Representative from District 1 in the August 9, 2022, special election. In the 2022 general election on November 8, the 1st District Legal Marijuana Now Party nominated substitute teacher and former city clerk Eric Leitzen for Minnesota State Senator from District 26.

=== District 2 ===
In 2020, in Minnesota's 2nd congressional district where Democratic Representative Angie Craig was seeking re-election in a close race, Legal Marijuana Now candidate Adam Weeks died four weeks before the November 3 election, throwing the election into chaos because a Minnesota state law said that if a major party candidate died during an election campaign, a special election would be held. Federal judges ruled that the election should go ahead, so the name of the candidate who was nominated by Legal Marijuana Now Party to replace Weeks, was not on the ballot. District 2 Legal Marijuana Now Party leaders encouraged their supporters to cast their votes for Weeks, in memoriam, and the dead candidate received 5.83 percent of votes in the three-way race.

=== District 3 ===
The District 3 Grassroots Party nominated Dwight Fellman to run for United States Representative from Minnesota's 3rd congressional district, in 1992, by petitioning the state. Fellman received 9,164 votes.

On May 10, 2024, the Minnesota Supreme Court ruled that Legal Marijuana Now! Party no longer qualified for major party ballot access under a 2023 law passed by the Minnesota Legislature, and Legal Marijuana Now candidates would be required to petition during the two week filing window beginning May 21 to be on the ballot. Edina author Anthony Walsh, who had launched an independent Legal Marijuana Now campaign for United States Representative from CD-3 a year earlier, was denied ballot access by Secretary of State Steve Simon for not having the 1,000 signatures needed, so Walsh ran a write-in campaign for Congress in 2024.

=== District 4 ===
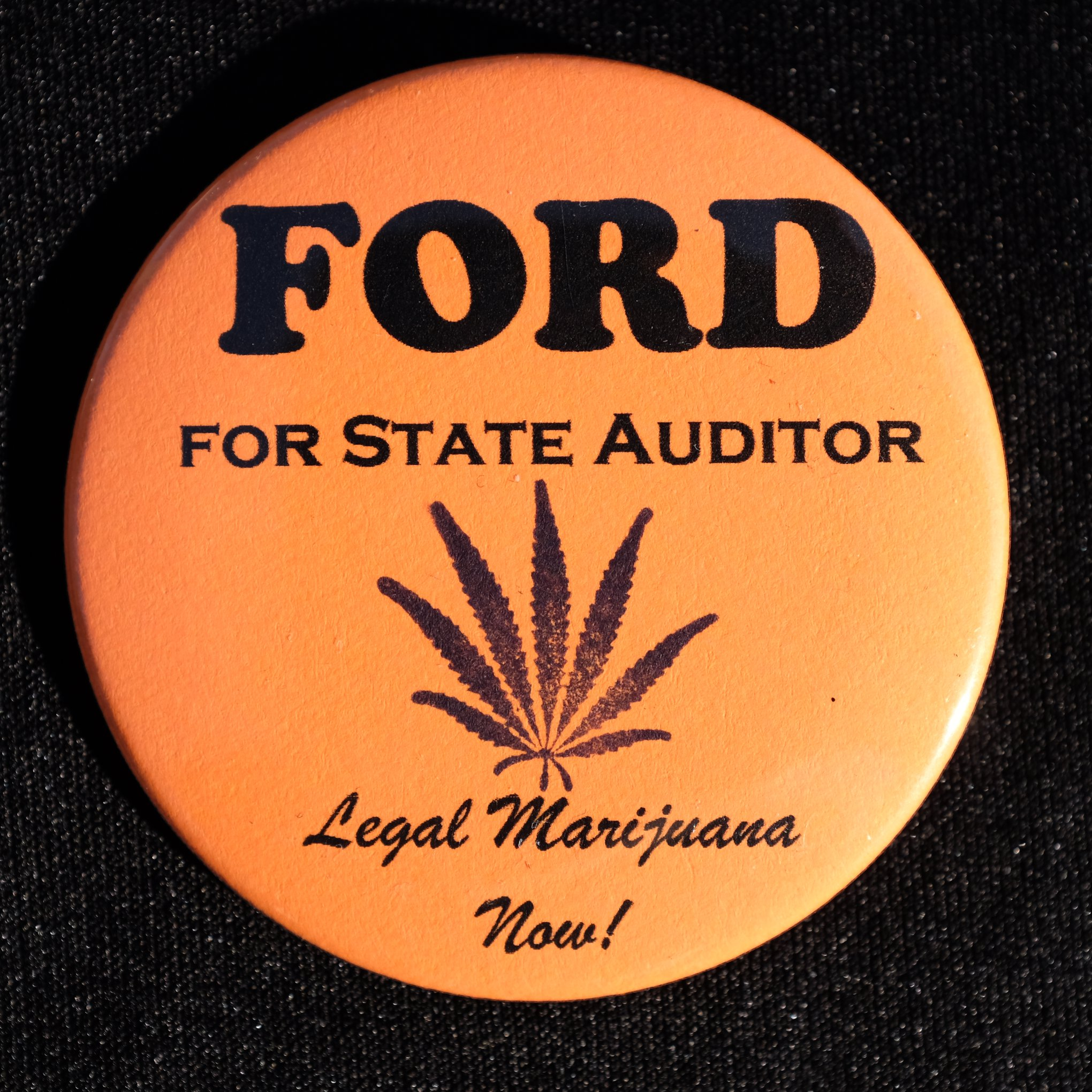
Ford for State Auditor campaign pin, circa 2018

In 2014, the Legal Marijuana Now candidate for Minnesota Attorney General got 57,604 votes, qualifying the party to receive public funding from the state. The Grassroots–Legalize Cannabis Party was formed in Minnesota in 2014.

In 2018, the Legal Marijuana Now nominee for State Auditor, Michael Ford, who is African-American, got 133,913 votes or 5.28 percent, qualifying Minnesota Legal Marijuana Now Party to have major party ballot access. In 2018, the Grassroots–Legalize Cannabis Party attained major party status in Minnesota when their Attorney General candidate, who dropped out of the race to support the Democratic candidate, but whose name nevertheless remained on ballots, received 5.7 percent of the vote. In 2020, the Minnesota Legal Marijuana Now candidate for United States Senator received 190,154 votes, more than any other such third-party candidate in the nation.

Shortly before Minnesota's May deadline to file such a change in time for the 2022 elections, a DFL Party activist, Marcus Harcus, who previously had been 2020 Grassroots–Legalize Cannabis Party nominee for state representative, attempted to hold a G—LC Party meeting for the purpose of changing the Grassroots–Legalize Cannabis Party's name to a name the activist thought might help the Democratic Party by attracting votes from Republicans.

=== District 5 ===
The Grassroots Party was established in Minnesota in 1986, by Tim Davis, Derrick Grimmer, Oliver Steinberg, and Chris Wright, in response to Ronald Reagan's war on drugs. Derrick Grimmer, Ph.D., ran for Minnesota Attorney General in 1986. Grimmer received 16,394 votes.

Ross Culverhouse, a computer programmer and Vietnam veteran was the Grassroots gubernatorial candidate, in 1990. Culverhouse received 17,176 votes. Will Shetterly, a science-fiction writer and actor, ran for governor of Minnesota in 1994. He placed third out of six candidates.

Grassroots Party nominated David Daniels, an African American playwright from Minneapolis, in 2000, as candidate for U.S. Senate. Daniels received 21,447 votes. Chris Wright ran for Governor of Minnesota in 2010 as a Grassroots Party nominee, and in 2014 and 2018 as a Grassroots–Legalize Cannabis candidate.

=== District 6 ===
Congressional District 6 Legal Marijuana Now Party placed Zach Phelps on the ballot in the Minnesota State Senate District 35 special election, in February 2016.

=== District 7 ===
Grassroots–Legalize Cannabis candidate Kevin Shores told a FOX 9 television reporter that he was recruited to run for Congress from Minnesota's 7th district, where Democratic incumbent Collin Peterson lost the race to Republican challenger Michelle Fischbach, in 2020, by a Republican strategist who Shores mistakenly thought was a G—LC representative. Shores, who is blind and suffers from Gulf War syndrome, lost to perennial Republican candidate Rae Hart Anderson in the August 11 Grassroots–Legalize Cannabis Party 7th congressional district primary.

In the 2022 election for United States Representative from District 7, Travis "Bull" Johnson, a Beltrami, Minnesota, goat farmer and U.S. Army veteran, was endorsed by former District 7 Representative Peterson, who held the office for 30 years, from 1991 to 2021. Finishing third in the election, Legal Marijuana Now candidate Johnson got 16,421 votes, placing fourth highest out of 126 contests nationally, in 2022, with third party or independent candidates in three-way races.

=== District 8 ===
The 8th Congressional District Legal Marijuana Now Party placed a candidate, John "Sparky" Birrenbach, of Pine City on the ballot in the Minnesota State Senate District 11 Special Election, in February 2019.

=== Anoka County ===
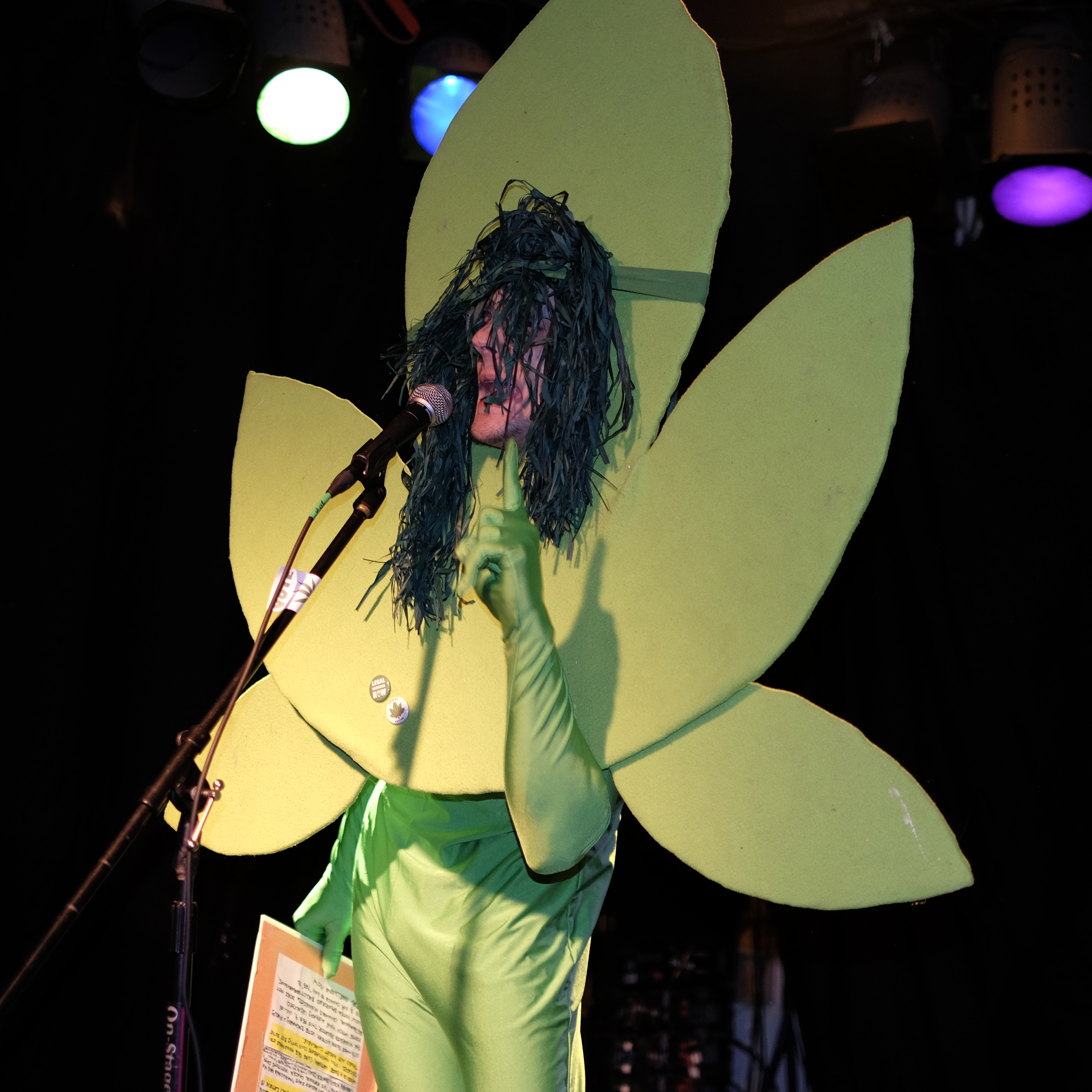
Comedian dressed as Legal Marijuana Now! Party mascot Marvelous Leaf, at 2016 District 35 special election fundraiser for Zach Phelps, in Anoka.

Anoka County Legal Marijuana Now Party placed a candidate, Zach Phelps, on the ballot in the Minnesota Senate District 35 special election, in February 2016, by petitioning the state.

=== Dakota County ===
In 1992, the Dakota County Grassroots Party nominated Dwight Fellman to run for United States Representative from the 3rd congressional district. Fellman received 9,164 votes.

Democrats in Dakota County have stated that cannabis political party candidates are detrimental to Democratic candidates, in tight races. An analysis of votes cast in the 2020 Minnesota elections found that Grassroots–Legalize Cannabis and Legal Marijuana Now candidates might have helped Democratic candidates in swing districts, by drawing as many or more votes from Republican voters.

Paula Overby, a supporter of Bernie Sanders, was nominated by Minnesota Legal Marijuana Now Party, in 2022, to run for U.S. Representative from Minnesota's 2nd congressional district, an independent stronghold. Overby, an information technology director and author of the 2017 book The Transgender Myth, and previous 2020 Legal Marijuana Now Party District 2 nominee, died On October 5, 2022, during recovery in a hospital following surgery for a heart valve condition. Overby's platform included marijuana legalization and universal Medicare. Without remedy for replacing their deceased nominee, under state law, LMN encouraged supporters to cast their votes for Overby, who remained on the ballot. The party was joined in support of voting in memoriam by Right Now USA, a conservative political action committee, while the Minnesota D—F—L Party paid for advertisements against Legal Marijuana Now, in District 2. The dead candidate, Overby, got 10,728 votes in Minnesota's 2nd district, in 2022.

=== Hennepin County ===
In 1996, Grassroots Party placed their presidential candidates onto ballots in Minnesota and Vermont. Grassroots presidential nominee, businessman Dennis Peron, who in 1991 opened the first public American cannabis dispensary, the San Francisco Cannabis Buyers Club, received 5,378 votes. In 1996, Russell Bentley, a Grassroots nominee for US Senate in 1990 and U.S. Congress in 1992 and Minnesota Grassroots Party board member, was arrested on marijuana smuggling charges. Bentley was sentenced to five years in federal prison.

Legal Marijuana Now! Party held a presidential primary on March 5, 2024. Five candidates were on the Minnesota primary ballot. Presidential delegates to the national Legal Marijuana Now convention were awarded proportionally based on the results. At the national convention held in Bloomington on July 6, Richfield small business owner Dennis Schuller and his running mate California archeologist Rudy Reyes were nominated for the 2024 Legal Marijuana Now presidential ticket.

Legal Marijuana Now! candidate Anthony Walsh ran for Hennepin County District 3 Commissioner in 2026 attempting to unseat Democratic-endorsed incumbent Commissioner Marion Greene. Walsh was eliminated in the August 11 primary with 4,121 votes, finishing third in the contest between six contenders for two spots on November general election ballots.

=== Ramsey County ===
Minnesota businessman John Birrenbach, a U.S. Navy veteran known to supporters as "Hemp John," was the Independent Grassroots Party presidential nominee in 1996. In 1998, members of the Independent Grassroots Party established the Legal Marijuana Now political party, in Minnesota. Birrenbach was a candidate in the 2000 Minnesota House of Representatives election for the Independence Party, running in District 65B.

=== St. Louis County ===
In 2019, Hemp John Birrenbach was a candidate for Minnesota Senate in the District 11 special election as a Legal Marijuana Now Party nominee.

== Criticisms ==
During the 2020 election campaign, Democrats in Minnesota said that the cannabis party candidates hurt Democratic Party nominees, but an analysis of votes cast in the 2020 elections found that the marijuana parties might have helped Democratic candidates in swing districts, by drawing at least as many or more votes from Republican-leaning voters.

After Legal Marijuana Now! chair Davis was the party's Minnesota State Auditor nominee in 2022, Incumbent Democratic Auditor Julie Blaha remarked disapprovingly of Davis' campaign material because in addition to promoting cannabis law reform his fliers and website criticized Blaha's involvement in a car crash, and accused the D–F–L of covering up alcohol use by Blaha contributing to the vehicle rollover. Blaha would have gotten another $28,000 from Minnesota's elections fund in 2022, on top of $56,000 in public money already used by her campaign, had Davis not claimed his share of the Minnesota elections subsidy.

In 2023, DFL Party chair Ken Martin accused Minnesota third party organizations, including Legal Marijuana Now! Party, of being unable to adequately vet their candidates. Martin supported a proposal to make it more difficult for parties other than the Democratic or Republican Party to gain ballot access, by raising the requirement in Minnesota from five percent to ten percent. The Green Party, the Legal Marijuana Now Party, and the Libertarian Party, together with former governor Ventura, opposed the proposal. In 2023, the Minnesota Legislature and Democratic Governor Tim Walz raised the state ballot access requirement to eight percent, making it more difficult for third parties to gain ballot access, effective in 2024.

== Notable Minnesota cannabis political parties ==
Cannabis political parties, and other political parties advocating for cannabis legalization, that are currently active or have been active in the past in Minnesota include:

- Democratic–Farmer–Labor Party
- Grassroots–Legalize Cannabis Party
- Grassroots Party
- Green Party
- Independence Party
- Independent Grassroots
- Legal Marijuana Now! Party
- Libertarian Party
- Reform Party

== See also ==
- Cannabis in Minnesota
- Cannabis political parties of the United States
