= Minnesota Legal Marijuana Now! Party =

Minnesota political party advocating cannabis legalization

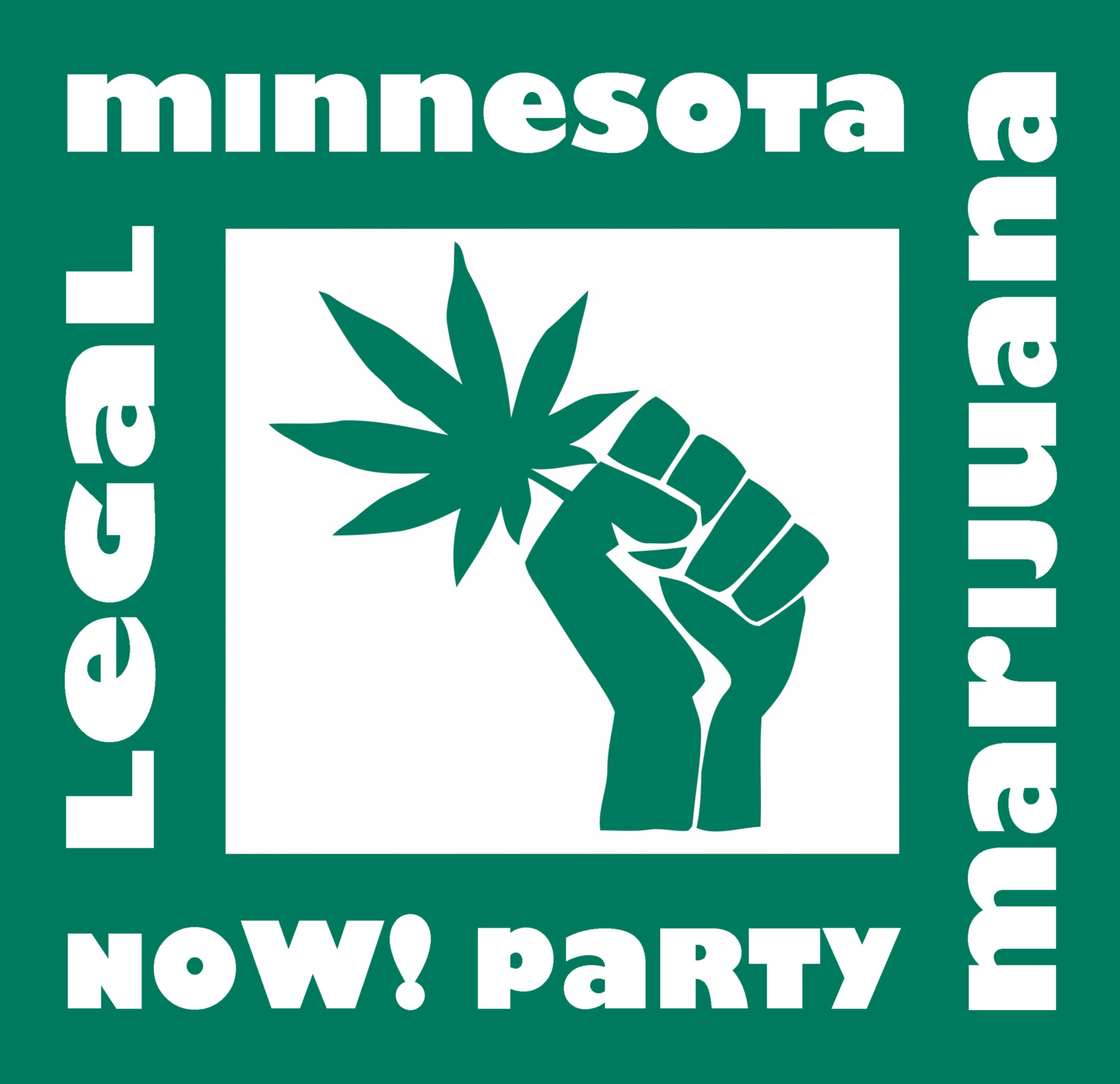
- Abbreviation: LMN
- Chairperson: Dennis Schuller (2023—present); Tim Davis (2020—2023); Marty Super (2018—2019); Michael Ford (2016—2018); Dan Vacek (2015—2016)
- Founder: John Birrenbach; Oliver Steinberg; Marty Super; Dan Vacek
- Founded: 1998; 28 years ago
- Preceded by: Independent Grassroots Party
- Headquarters: Minneapolis
- Newspaper: Freedom Gazette
- Ideology: Marijuana legalization
- National affiliation: Legal Marijuana Now
- Colors: Green, gold, red

Party flag

Website
- www.legalmarijuananowparty.com

Minnesota Legal Marijuana Now! is a political third party in the U.S. state of Minnesota established in 1998 to oppose drug prohibition. They are formally recognized as a minor party.

Minnesota Legal Marijuana Now! became a major party in Minnesota in 2018 when their candidate for State Auditor, Michael Ford, received 5.3 percent of the vote. During the 2010s the party began expansion attempts to Iowa, Nebraska, other states, continuing during the 2020s, as the Legal Marijuana Now Party.

In 2020, the Minnesota Legal Marijuana Now! nominee for United States Senator received 190,154 votes in the November 3 election, the largest number of votes received in 2020, in the U.S., by any such third-party candidate. Democrats have stated that Legal Marijuana Now! candidates are detrimental to the Democratic Party. An analysis of votes cast in the 2020 Minnesota elections found that Legal Marijuana Now! candidates might have helped Democratic candidates in swing districts, by drawing a greater number of votes from Republican-leaning voters, in 2020.

Scholars have credited Minnesota's third parties, and particularly Legal Marijuana Now!, with motivating the state Democratic Party to prioritize cannabis legalization in 2023. They lost their major party status in a 2024 challenge by the Minnesota Democratic Party with the state Supreme Court.

== Early history ==
=== Background before 1998 ===
The Minnesota Grassroots Party was formed in 1986 as a response to Ronald Reagan's war on drugs. In 1996 the party split, with some former members forming the Independent Grassroots Party for one election cycle.

=== 1998—2015 ===
In 1998, members of the Independent Grassroots Party formed the Minnesota Legal Marijuana Now! political party. According to the Legal Marijuana Now Party, a person’s right to sell the products of their garden is protected by the Minnesota Constitution.

Minnesota does not allow voters to petition to put the law itself onto the ballot for a vote. The only petition the people can use in Minnesota is to nominate independent and third party candidates for office.

In 2014, Dan Vacek ran for Minnesota Attorney General as the Legal Marijuana Now candidate and got 57,604 votes, qualifying the party to be officially recognized and to receive public funding from the state.

== 2016—2022 ==
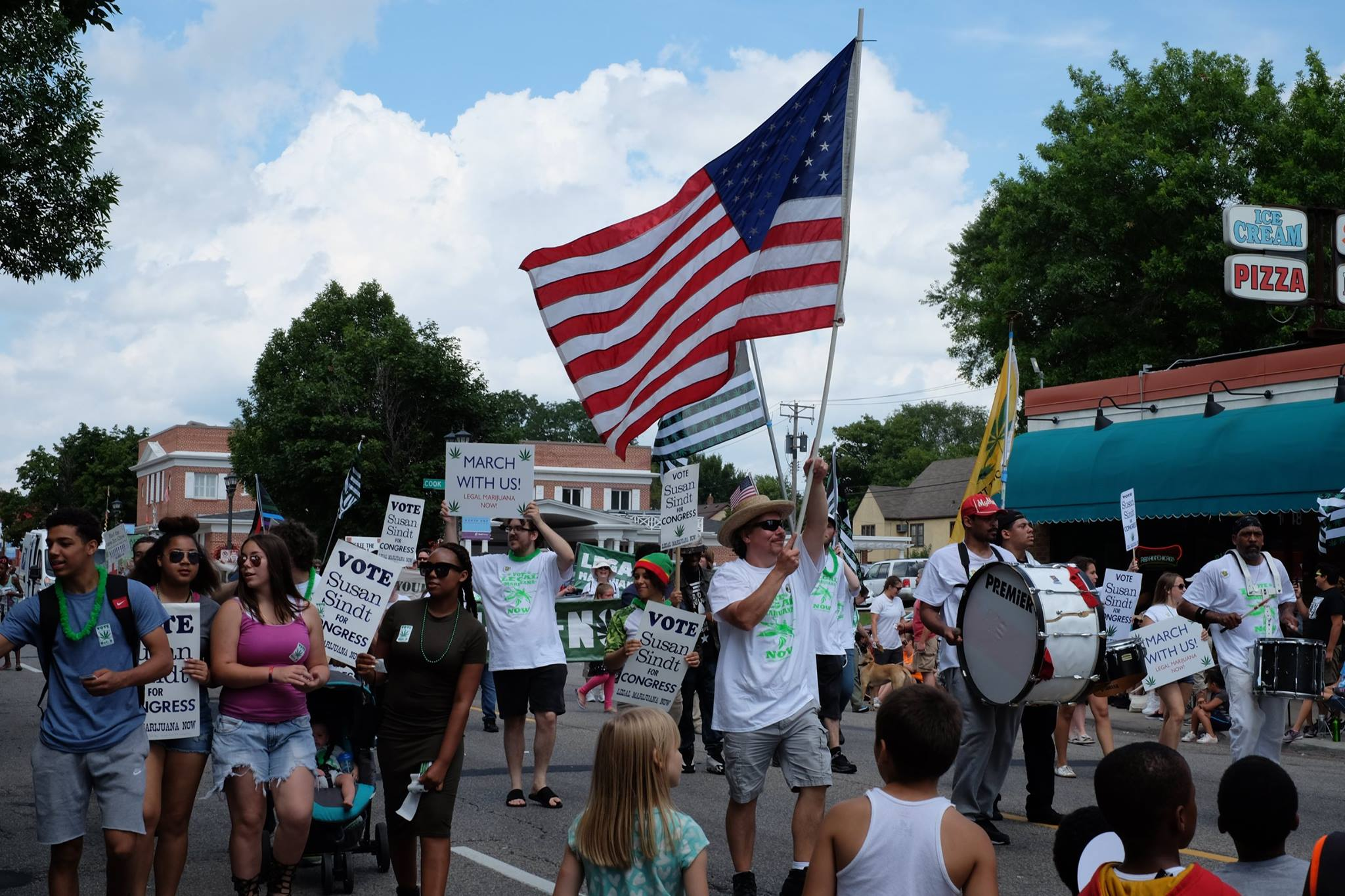
Minnesota Legal Marijuana Now! Party marching in Saint Paul's 2016 Rice Street Parade

=== 2016—2018 ===
The Legal Marijuana Now Party placed a candidate, Zach Phelps, on the ballot in the Minnesota State Senate District 35 Special Election, in February 2016.

Minnesota Legal Marijuana Now nominated candidates by petition to appear on the ballot for the November 6, 2018, election. Their candidate for State Auditor, Michael Ford, who is African-American, received 133,913 votes or 5.28%, qualifying Minnesota Legal Marijuana Now Party to be an official major party in the state, which gave Legal Marijuana Now candidates ballot access without the task of having to petition.

=== 2019—2020 ===
Legal Marijuana Now! nominated John “Sparky” Birrenbach, of Pine City in the Minnesota State Senate District 11 Special Election, in February 2019.

In 2020, Legal Marijuana Now! candidate Adam Weeks who was on the ballot in Minnesota's 2nd congressional district where Democratic Representative Angie Craig was seeking re-election in a close race, died four weeks before the November 3 election, throwing the election into chaos because a Minnesota state law said that if a major party candidate died during an election campaign, a special election would be held. Prior to his death, Weeks had boasted in a voicemail left for an estranged friend that a Republican had offered him money to run against the Republican and Democratic candidates. Federal judges ruled that the election should go ahead because federal law setting the date of the election preempted the state law, so the name of the candidate, Paula Overby, who was nominated by Legal Marijuana Now! Party to replace Weeks, was not on the ballot. Minnesota Legal Marijuana Now! Party chair Tim Davis said in a court filing that the ruling would disenfranchise party voters, and later encouraged Legal Marijuana Now! supporters to cast their votes for Weeks, in memoriam. The dead candidate received 5.83% of votes in the three-way race.

During the 2020 election campaign, Minnesota Democratic Party leaders said that the Legal Marijuana Now! Party made it harder for DFL candidates to win. But a St. Cloud Times analysis of votes cast in the November 3, 2020, election found that the marijuana candidates pulled at least as many votes, if not more, from Republican candidates than they took from Democratic candidates.

Kevin O’Connor, the Legal Marijuana Now! nominee for United States Senator in 2020, secured ballot access for the party until 2024 by receiving 190,154 votes in the November 3 election, the largest number of votes received by any such third-party candidate nationwide, and more votes than the winner, DFL Senator Tina Smith, led her Republican challenger, radio personality Jason Lewis, in the race.

=== 2021—2022 ===
==== 2021 municipal elections ====
Legal Marijuana Now congressional candidate Mickey Moore entered the 2021 Ward 9 Minneapolis City Council race. In the nonpartisan municipal election, Moore was endorsed by the Minneapolis Area DFL Senior Caucus, Operation Safety Now, Minneapolis’ firefighters union. Other candidates in the race had endorsements including the Minneapolis Democratic Party, Twin Cities Democratic Socialists, Somali Business Association.

==== 2022 congressional District 1 special election ====
Minnesota Legal Marijuana Now Party nominated Richard Reisdorf of Mankato, a disabled American war veteran, to run for United States Representative from Minnesota's 1st congressional district in the August 9, 2022, special election.

==== 2022 gubernatorial primary ====
On August 9, 2022, Minnesota Legal Marijuana Now Party held a gubernatorial primary between James McCaskel and David Sandbeck, and Chris Wright and L.C. Converse. McCaskel was nominated for Governor of Minnesota by 52 percent of Legal Marijuana Now voters.

==== 2022 Minnesota state elections ====
In 2022, Minnesota Legal Marijuana Now! Party nominated substitute teacher and former city clerk Eric Leitzen for Minnesota State Senator from District 26. In the District 54A race for Minnesota State Representative, Legal Marijuana Now! Party nominated Ryan Martin, an automobile mechanic who was the party’s choice for District 55A representative in 2020.

Legal Marijuana Now! chair Davis was the party's 2022 Minnesota State Auditor nominee. To qualify and receive a share of Minnesota's elections funding intended to help regular Minnesotans run for office, Davis met a $6000 fundraising requirement before the summer deadline, reporting all income and expenditures publicly. Davis used the $28,000 Minnesota subsidy to print and distribute pro-marijuana legalization campaign fliers door to door, across the state. Incumbent Democratic State Auditor Julie Blaha criticized Davis' brochures and website for not only promoting cannabis law reform, but also criticizing Blaha's involvement in a car crash and alleging a Democratic–Farmer–Labor Party coverup of alcohol use contributing to the single-vehicle rollover. Blaha would have gotten another $28,000 from the fund in 2022, on top of $56,000 in public money already used by her campaign, had Davis not taken the state payout. Davis received 87,386 votes in the November 2022 State Auditor election, falling just short of the 5% threshold to major party status needed for extending Minnesota Legal Marijuana Now! Party ballot access through 2026.

==== 2022 federal elections ====
Paula Overby, a supporter of Bernie Sanders who sought the DFL nomination for U.S. Senator in 2020, was nominated by Minnesota Legal Marijuana Now Party, in 2022, to run for U.S. Representative from the 2nd congressional district. Overby, an information technology director and author of the 2017 book The Transgender Myth: Through the Gender Looking Glass, had previously been nominated by Legal Marijuana Now Party for the 2nd congressional district in 2020 after candidate Adam Weeks' death. Overby’s platform included marijuana legalization and universal Medicare.

According to Representative Craig, Minnesota's 2nd congressional district is an independent stronghold. "About one-third of the voters lean Democrat, one-third lean Republican, and the other third of voters don't really like Democrats or Republicans. They like their personal rights and freedoms and don't want politicians telling them what to do," Craig said in November.

On October 5, 2022, Overby died during recovery in a hospital following surgery for a heart valve condition. Minnesota Secretary of State Steve Simon stated that due to a 2021 federal court ruling in the wake of Adam Weeks' death, the congressional election would go ahead as scheduled on November 8, and Overby's name would remain on the ballot. Without remedy for replacing their deceased nominee, under state law, Legal Marijuana Now encouraged supporters to cast their votes for Overby. The party was joined in support of voting in memoriam by Right Now USA, a conservative political action committee, while the Minnesota DFL paid for advertisements against Legal Marijuana Now, in District 2. The dead candidate in 2022, Overby, won 10,728 votes in the race.

In the 2022 election for United States Representative from District 7, Travis "Bull" Johnson, a Beltrami, Minnesota, goat farmer and U.S. Army veteran, was endorsed by former District 7 Representative Collin Peterson, a Democrat who held the office for 30 years, from 1991 to 2021. Finishing third in the election, Legal Marijuana Now candidate Johnson got 16,421 votes, placing fourth highest out of 126 contests nationally, in 2022, with third party or independent candidates in three-way races.

== Since 2023 ==
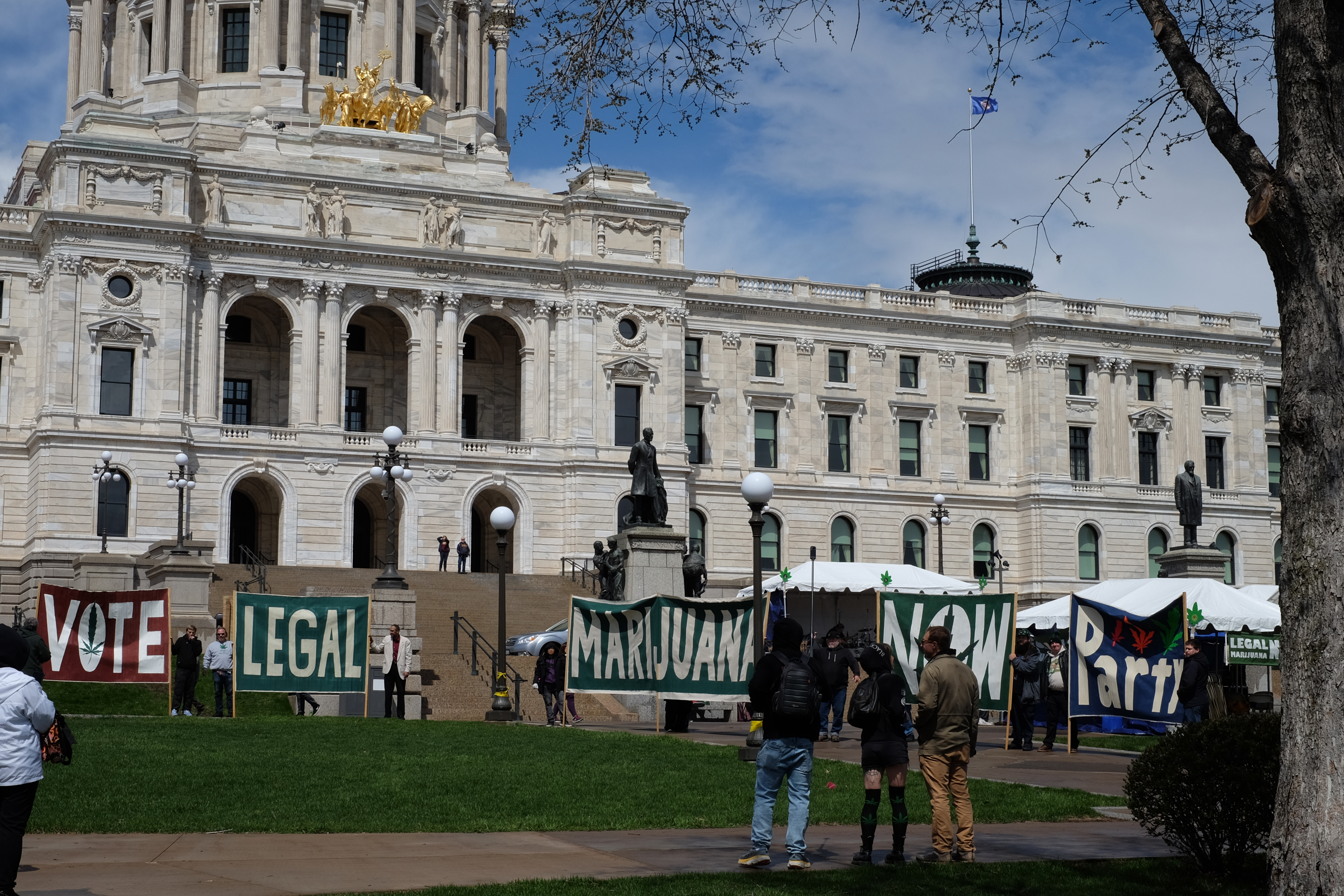
Legal Marijuana Now! Party celebrating on the Minnesota State Capitol steps, April 29, 2023

=== 2023—2025 ===
==== 2023 Minnesota Senate hearings ====
During testimony supporting Minnesota Senate File 73 to create a regulated commercial cannabis market, at the bill's first Minnesota Senate committee hearing, in 2023, Oliver Steinberg, a Legal Marijuana Now! Party founder, said that marijuana prohibition has not stopped people from using cannabis, but prohibition has "succeeded perhaps in terrorizing or intimidating citizens, in canceling civil liberties, blighting both urban and rural communities, all without eradicating the outlawed substance." Some political scholars have remarked that Minnesota's single-issue marijuana parties and strong third parties such as Independence, which evolved from Governor Jesse Ventura's Reform Party, motivated the state Democratic—Farmer—Labor Party to pass a marijuana legalization law, in 2023.

On Saturday, April 29, 2023, shortly after the Minnesota Senate voted to pass Senate File 73, Legal Marijuana Now! Party held their state and local conventions on the state capitol steps. The day's rally, featuring speakers and music by Paul Metsa and Kung Fu Hippies, grew into a celebration. Party spokesperson Dennis Schuller, who was nominated for Minnesota House of Representatives in 2020, told a Star Tribune reporter that federal prohibition laws against cannabis, overseeing implementation of the state's regulated market, and expungement of past criminal records, illustrate tasks that remain for Minnesota Legal Marijuana Now! Party, planning their future campaigns.

==== 2024—2026 elections ====
Minnesota Legal Marijuana Now! Party held a presidential nomination primary on March 5, 2024, for the 2024 presidential election. The contest was held on Super Tuesday alongside primaries in 14 other states and territories. The race was the first Legal Marijuana Now! presidential primary, and the first third party presidential primary run by the state of Minnesota since 1916. Presidential delegates to the national LMNP convention were awarded proportionally by the primary results, at the state party convention held in Caledonia on May 8. Schuller and his running mate, California archeologist Rudy Reyes were nominated for the presidential ticket by LMNP at the national convention in Bloomington, on July 6.

On May 10, 2024, the Minnesota Supreme Court ruled that Legal Marijuana Now! no longer met the criteria for major party status in Minnesota. Among other things, this removed their automatic ballot access and some legal protections. Candidate filing in Minnesota began on May 21, and LMNP candidates were required to petition, by June 4, for ballot access. Edina author Anthony Walsh, who had launched an independent LMNP campaign for U.S. Representative from CD-3 a year earlier, was rejected by Minnesota Secretary of State Simon for not having the 1,000 signatures needed, so Walsh instead ran a write-in campaign for Congress, in 2024.

Walsh ran for Hennepin County District 3 Commissioner in 2026 attempting to unseat Democratic-endorsed incumbent Commissioner Marion Greene. Walsh was eliminated in the August 11 primary with 4,121 votes, finishing third in the contest between six contenders for two spots on November general election ballots.

== Electoral history ==
=== 1998 election results ===
Year	Office	Candidate	Popular votes	Percentage
1998	United States Representative, District 4	Dan Vacek	5,839	2.40%

=== 2014—2018 election results ===
Year	Office	Candidate	Popular votes	Percentage
2014	Minnesota Attorney General	Dan Vacek	57,604	2.99%
2016	Minnesota State Senator, District 35	Zachary Phelps	180	4.10%
2016	United States Representative, District 4	Susan Pendergast Sindt	27,152	7.71%
2016	United States Representative, District 5	Dennis Schuller	30,759	8.50%
2016	Minnesota State Senator, District 60	Martin Super	8,861	21.78%
2018	United States Senator	Dennis Schuller	66,236	2.55%
2018	United States Senator	Sarah Wellington	95,614	3.70%
2018	United States Representative, District 4	Susan Pendergast Sindt	13,776	4.19%
2018	Minnesota State Auditor	Michael Ford	133,913	5.28%

=== 2019—2022 Minnesota state election results ===
Year	Office	Candidate	Popular votes	Percentage
2019	Minnesota State Senator, District 11	John Birrenbach	298	1.91%
2020	Minnesota State Representative, District 60A	Marty Super	247	11.49%
2020	Minnesota State Senator, District 5	Robyn Smith	2,400	5.30%
2020	Minnesota State Senator, District 14	Jaden Partlow	3,127	7.92%
2020	Minnesota State Senator, District 16	Steve “Stoney” Preslicka	4,880	12.10%
2020	Minnesota State Senator, District 23	David Pulkrabek	8,730	21.11%
2020	Minnesota State Senator, District 27	Tyler Becvar	2,699	6.68%
2020	Minnesota State Senator, District 45	Andy Schuler	4,729	9.88%
2020	Minnesota State Senator, District 64	Patricia Jirovec McArdell	3,281	6.42%
2020	Minnesota State Representative, District 17A	Ed Engelmann	1,007	4.88%
2020	Minnesota State Representative, District 40B	Mary O’Connor	2,147	11.86%
2020	Minnesota State Representative, District 55A	Ryan Martin	1,706	7.40%
2020	Minnesota State Representative, District 63A	David Wiester	1,881	7.14%
2020	Minnesota State Representative, District 63B	Dennis Schuller	2,039	7.84%
2022	Minnesota State Auditor	Tim Davis	87,386	3.55%
2022	Minnesota State Senator, District 26	Eric Leitzen	1,060	2.88%
2022	Minnesota State Senator, District 38	Mary O'Connor	1,602	7.25%
2022	Minnesota State Senator, District 43	Andrew Schuler	7,686	21.72%
2022	Minnesota State Representative, District 53A	Brent Jacobson	785	3.97%
2022	Minnesota State Representative, District 53B	Laura Pride	1,074	6.28%
2022	Minnesota State Representative, District 54A	Ryan Martin	690	4.33%
2022	Minnesota State Representative, District 65A	Miki Frost	1,302	13.21%

=== 2022 Minnesota gubernatorial election results ===
Year	Governor candidate	Lt. Governor candidate	Votes	Percentage
2022	James McCaskel	David Sandbeck	29,346	1.17%

=== 2020—2022 federal election results ===
Year	Office	Candidate	Popular votes	Percentage
2020	United States Senator	Kevin O’Connor	190,154	5.92%
2020	United States Representative, District 2	Adam Charles Weeks	24,751	5.83%
2020	United States Representative, District 5	Michael Moore	29,537	9.54%
2020	United States Representative, District 7	Slater Johnson	37,979	4.87%
2022	United States Representative, District 1	Richard Reisdorf	1,545	1.30%
2022	United States Representative, District 1	Richard Reisdorf	6,389	2.15%
2022	United States Representative, District 2	Paula Overby	10,728	3.30%
2022	United States Representative, District 7	Travis "Bull" Johnson	16,421	5.37%

== Leadership ==
Minnesota Legal Marijuana Now! held their first convention and adopted a party constitution on November 26, 2014. Founding members Oliver Steinberg, Marty Super, and Dan Vacek comprised the organization's 2015 leadership council.

In 2016, Michael Ford was elected chair of Minnesota Legal Marijuana Now! Party. From 2018 through 2019, Marty Super served as chairperson. Tim Davis was chair of Minnesota Legal Marijuana Now! from 2020 until 2023, when Dennis Schuller became state party chair.

== See also ==
- Cannabis political parties of Minnesota
