= Rudy Reyes =

Rudy Reyes or Rudolph Reyes may refer to:

- Rudy Reyes (activist) (born 1977), American activist
- Rudy Reyes (actor) (born 1971), American actor
- Rudy Reyes (athlete) (born 1979), Cuban baseball player
