= Paula Overby =

American politician (1954–2022)

- Paula Overby at Minnesota State Capitol National Guard rally, September 10, 2022
- Born: Paul Overby; February 28, 1954; Redwood Falls, Minnesota
- Died: October 5, 2022 (aged 68); Eagan, Minnesota
- Other name: Paula Mirare Overby
- Education: University of Minnesota (BA)
- Occupation: Information technology director
- Known for: Cannabis rights, LGBTQ rights
- Notable work: The Transgender Myth: Through the Gender Looking Glass (2017)
- Political party: Legal Marijuana Now
- Other political affiliations: Green (2018); Independence (2014–2016); Democratic (2012–2014, 2020)
- Children: Jamie Weber; Courtney Overby; Tyler Overby

Paula Mirare Overby (born Paul Overby; February 28, 1954 – October 5, 2022) was an American author, computer technician, gay parent, mental health counselor, minor party, LGBTQ, and cannabis rights leader who died four weeks before Election Day while campaigning as a marijuana party nominee for United States Congress from Minnesota.

== Activism career ==
=== Democratic Party ===
Overby, who in 2013 was elected Democratic–Farmer–Labor Party state central committee director, sought the 2014 D–F–L endorsement for United States Representative from Minnesota's 2nd congressional district. Overby withdrew from the Democratic nomination when Mike Obermueller was picked for a second attempt by him to unseat incumbent Representative John Kline, during the District 2 Democratic convention on April 26.

=== Independence Party ===
Overby left the Democratic Party in 2014 and was nominated for 2nd District Representative by the Independence Party. Overby's campaign focused on public third party political funding reform, making elections more engaging and more responsive to people's needs.

Independence became a ballot qualified third party when Dean Barkley got more than five percent in the 1994 United States Senate election. Independence remained ballot qualified in Minnesota for two decades, until 2016, when Overby was again Independence Party nominee in District 2, and got 28,869 votes, 7.8 percent.

=== Green Party and return to DFL ===
Green Party, which had been a Minnesota major party after Ralph Nader got 5.2% in the 2000 presidential election, became an officially recognized minor party after 2004. Overby was Minnesota Green Party's United States Senate candidate in 2018 by petitioning the state for ballot access, receiving 23,101 votes in the four-way race on November 6.

Returning to the Democratic Party in 2020 and seeking the D–F–L nomination for US Senator, Overby challenged Democratic Senator Tina Smith, who was previously Lieutenant Governor and had been appointed to US Senate by Governor Mark Dayton when Senator Al Franken resigned. Although she was eliminated in the August primary, Overby led the field of four Democratic challengers to Smith, getting 30,497 votes in the state primary, in 2020.

=== 2020 Legal Marijuana Now! Party nomination ===
In September 2020 when Legal Marijuana Now candidate Adam Weeks, who was on the ballot in Minnesota's 2nd congressional district, died four weeks before November 3, Overby was nominated by Minnesota Legal Marijuana Now! Party to replace Weeks. LMNP chair Tim Davis said in a court filing that the ruling to go ahead without holding a 2021 special election including Overby's name on the ballot would disenfranchise Legal Marijuana Now! voters.

Legal Marijuana Now! became a Minnesota major party in 2018, when their State Auditor nominee Michael Ford, who is African-American, received 5.3 percent. Kevin O’Connor, the Legal Marijuana Now! US Senator nominee, secured ballot access for the party until 2024 by receiving 190,154 votes in 2020, the largest number of votes received by any such third-party candidate nationwide, and more votes than the winner, DFL Senator Smith, led her Republican challenger, radio personality Jason Lewis, in the US Senate race. A St. Cloud Times analysis of 2020 votes suggested that O'Connor could have helped boost Smith's election margin, by drawing votes from Republican-leaning voters that might have otherwise gone to Lewis.

=== 2022 LMN congressional campaign ===
Overby was nominated a second time by Legal Marijuana Now! Party, in 2022, for U.S. Representative from District 2. Overby’s platform included marijuana legalization and universal Medicare. According to 2nd district representative Angie Craig, District 2 is an independent stronghold. Craig said in 2022, "About one-third of the voters lean Democrat, one-third lean Republican, and the other third of voters don't really like Democrats or Republicans. They like their personal rights and freedoms and don't want politicians telling them what to do."

Prior to November, liberal tabloids including Minnesota Reformer published sensational 2022 election headlines attacking Overby. On September 9, Overby said the accusation that minor party candidates like her are running just to take votes away from Democratic candidates is a false narrative "created to frighten people away from third parties." Overby continued, "This is the Democrats attacking the third-party at every opportunity they can find." On her social media September 11, 2022, Overby posted a photograph of herself with a 4:20 timestamp, at a National Guard rally on the steps of the Minnesota State Capitol building."

After Overby died following unexpected surgery for a heart valve condition only a month before the 2022 elections, Minnesota Secretary of State Steve Simon stated that due to a federal court ruling following Weeks' death in 2020, the congressional election would go ahead as scheduled on November 8, and Overby's name would remain on the ballot.

Without remedy for replacing her, under state law, Davis encouraged Legal Marijuana Now! Party supporters to cast their votes for Overby. The party was joined in support of voting in memoriam by Right Now USA, a conservative political action committee, while the DFL paid for advertisements warning against voting for Overby in District 2, asserting that a vote for her amounted to a vote for the GOP's candidate, Tyler Kistner.

Four weeks after her death, Overby got 10,728 votes for U.S. Representative on Election Day, November 8, 2022.

Despite Green Party, Legal Marijuana Now! Party, Libertarian Party, and former Reform Party governor Jesse Ventura opposing the proposal, in 2023 the DFL-controlled Minnesota Legislature and Governor Tim Walz, alleging Overby's and Davis' 2022 LMNP congressional and State Auditor campaigns had been fraudulent, enacted a law increasing the major party qualification in Minnesota from five percent to eight percent of the vote in a statewide election, making it more difficult for parties other than the Democratic or Republican Party to gain ballot access in state elections.

=== Minnesota Republicans and Libertarians ===
In an October 2022 Star Tribune interview, her son Tyler said Overby was able to strike up a conversation with anybody, and had friends everywhere. In September 2022, Minnesota Reformer had reported that a Republican, 2012 District 52B State Representative GOP nominee Paul Tuschy, who was known in political circles by his moniker Liberty Longbeard, was friends with Overby. Tuschy and Overby both knew 2020 Legal Marijuana Now! candidate Weeks, prior to his death, and Tuschy, who had worked briefly for Kistner's 2020 election campaign, volunteered for Overby, essentially serving as her District 2 campaign manager, in 2022. Tuschy spoke at Overby's memorial service in Saint Paul on November 3, 2022, joining family and friends belonging to one half dozen Minnesota parties.

== Political views ==
=== Civil rights ===
Overby was the first openly transgender person in Minnesota to run for US Congress, according to St. Paul Pioneer Press. Author of the 2017 autobiography, The Transgender Myth: Through the Gender Looking Glass, Overby championed LGBTQ rights and cannabis consumer rights, and stood up for disenfranchised minority groups as a third party nominee. Overby got involved with Minnesota Legal Marijuana Now! Party by January, 2017. Saying that she planned for her gender to play no more than a small role in her campaign, Overby speculated that some people would see a transgender woman running for office as courageous, while others would refuse to vote for her because of it.

=== Economy ===
Overby described herself as conservative regarding economic issues, believing that her responsibility to American taxpayers, as a future public servant, included keeping the federal budget balanced.

=== Education ===
In 2014, Overby said that her 24 year old daughter Courtney's experience with accumulating student loan debt while attending college in Minneapolis had prompted Overby to focus her election campaign on resolving the problem of rising higher education costs.

=== Environment ===
Critical of world oil dependence, and what she called bloated federal spending for environmentally disastrous global wars in place of developing US energy independence, Overby said in a February 2020 campaign advertisement on YouTube, "Climate is the modern day challenge. ... We need a major shift in priorities in Washington. The pride of American innovation ought to make us the global leader in climate action, the future of the planet awaits us."

=== Healthcare ===
Overby's work as a mental health counselor in the 1980s led to her commitment as a candidate to supporting public programs that help people with mental illness, expressing interest in reviewing the programs so they can operate more efficiently. Saying that corporate profiteering undermined the US healthcare system, Overby was a proponent of universal Medicare.

=== National defense ===
To pay for the federal education and mental health programs she advocated, Overby proposed cutting what she described as wasteful military spending for wars benefitting US corporate oversea oil profits. Supporting a strong National Guard, Overby participated in a September 2022 Defend the Guard demonstration, held at the State Capitol in Saint Paul.

=== Social justice ===
Blaming America's two dominant political parties for dividing the country, in 2014 Overby told Star Tribune she thought that in national politics "The whole idea of a binary process, it's really not a realistic model. It does create this polarization we see." Overby was an outspoken supporter of socialist US Senator Bernie Sanders (Ind-Vermont) during Sanders' 2016 bid for the Democratic presidential nomination. Interviewed by Out in 2014 Overby said, "People are fed up. ... We need to bring back freedom, individual liberties, and individual responsibilities. We need representation that represents the people." Overby proposed political campaign finance reform to help level the playing field for minor party candidates and independents, to make elections appealing to more people.

== Personal life ==
=== Early life and education ===
Overby was born in Redwood Falls, Minnesota, and grew up in Milwaukee, Wisconsin. Their family moved to Nashua, New Hampshire, in 1968 when Overby was fourteen years old. After graduating from high school in 1972, Overby returned to Minnesota, earning degrees in psychology and computer science at University of Minnesota, in Minneapolis.

=== Marriage ===
Overby married in 1984, and adopted three year old Jamie, their wife Marie's daughter from a prior relationship. The couple had two children of their own, Courtney and Tyler. In 2009, Overby began a two year long custody battle over Tyler, who was 15, and the marriage to Marie ended in divorce.

=== Gender transition ===
While identifying as a gay man in college, marrying a woman, raising a family, Overby was a closeted crossdresser, open about preferring men sexually to wife, immediate family, close friends, and gradually beginning to wear women's clothing publicly during the 1990s, not daring to tell colleagues, even parents, before then. Following a period of alcohol abuse and depression culminating during the divorce, Overby came to terms with her sexual identity and began hormone treatment in 2011. Paul legally became Paula Mirare Overby March 2012.

=== Reception ===
Her father and brother, long deceased, never knew Overby's female identity, yet she believed her father would have been supportive, had he been alive. Overby's mother, in her 80s, took the transition hardest, continuing to use Overby's birth name. Her two sisters struggled through the change, nonetheless embracing Overby's decision. Even though Overby proposed to her while wearing a dress, and wife Marie accepted Paul's crossdressing and sexuality from the start, the couple gradually became estranged as Overby became more comfortable crossdressing publicly during the 1990s, eventually leading to their divorce. Overby was asked by her employer to work from home for one week, allowing time for other staff to adjust for the transition, which Overby said then went surprisingly well. Of her children, Overby's adopted daughter Jamie struggled hardest adjusting, however in 2014 Overby named her three children as being her most enthusiastic advocates. Her son Tyler told a reporter he was more astonished when she announced she would be running for Congress, saying of Overby's campaign, “I think it’s awesome, I think she has a great message and can get young people involved.”

=== Career ===
After graduating from college, Overby lived and worked in Germany, then back in Minnesota in 1979 began South St. Paul community mental health counseling, and gained business management experience before starting computer technician career, and moving to Eagan in 1987. The upheaval of separation and divorce court hearings left Overby homeless and unemployed in 2009, landing work at a bank by 2011. When she died in 2022, Overby was information technology director for the Friends School of Minnesota.

=== Volunteer service ===
A Head Council member and constitutional committee chair for Minnesota Legal Marijuana Now! Party at the time of her death, Overby's volunteer work included the Minnesota D–F–L central committee, Minnesota Greens, Independence Party of Minnesota, Bernie Sanders 2016 presidential campaign, Our Revolution, Minnesota Minor Party Coalition, East Metro Civic Alliance, Land Stewardship Project, and Twin Cities Men's Center board of directors.

== Autobiography ==
Overby's autobiographical novel The Transgender Myth: Through the Gender Looking Glass (ISBN 978-1532359958) was published in 2017. The chronicle's subtitle refers to Lewis Carroll's children's book Through the Looking-Glass, about entering a magical world. Overby recounts growing up, productive yet failed relationships, child custody fights, and transitioning from man to woman.

== Illness and death ==
According to friends and family members, Overby was hospitalized for a failing valve in September and underwent successful heart surgery expecting to recover, even accepting postoperative visitors, but never left the hospital and died on October 5, 2022.

== Legacy and recognition ==
Following Overby's untimely death one month before Election Day, Republican congressional opponent Kistner said Overby cared deeply about Minnesota, "It was an honor to have gotten to know Paula throughout this campaign." Though in 2023, less than six months after Overby died, state GOP chair David Hann wrote in support of legislation raising the threshold for third party ballot access, saying the change would still allow "smaller political parties access to the ballot with our state’s petition signature requirements," and arguing that the proposed obstacle to candidates such as Overby running with a minor party like LMN might "help prevent groups from playing games or abusing our elections process, as has happened in recent years," according to Hann.

On October 5, 2022, Legal Marijuana Now! Party Chair Davis said, “This has come up so suddenly," and "She’ll be greatly missed,” remarking that Overby effectively brought people together through her involvement in third party politics.

In September D–F–L chair Ken Martin had stated "it is clear that Paula Overby is another Republican spoiler candidate," a sentiment which was echoed in media coverage beyond 2024 when Martin filed lawsuit in state Supreme Court to rescind Legal Marijuana Now! Party's ballot access for candidates, and Democratic Senator Smith said "I’m celebrating the demise of Minnesota Republicans’ shell party, Legal Marijuana Now. Thanks for nothing," contradicting D–F–L statements made the day Overby died, when Representative Craig remarked that "Minnesota is better for her involvement in our community and she will be missed," and Martin said, "I would like to extend my deepest sympathies to Paula’s friends, family, and loved ones. ... I hope memories of Paula’s passion and tenacity bring them some solace in their grief."

Overby's 28 year old son, Tyler, told Minnesota Public Radio that he would miss his mother's advice, saying "... her ability to help no matter what problem you had without being condescending, she was just really good at being a guide to you figuring out yourself, or what you needed."

In front of the Minnesota House Elections Finance and Policy Committee on March 17, 2023, Libertarian Burnsville City Council member Cara Schulz held up pictures of Overby speaking in 2020 and campaigning with Legal Marijuana Now! Party in 2021 during Schulz's testimony opposing the bill HF 2802 introduced by Representative Luke Frederick (D-Mankato) raising the requirement for new Minnesota major parties from five to eight percent of the total number of votes cast in a statewide election. Schulz commented, "This is Paula Overby. I want you to know her as a human being. ... Paula was an amazing woman. She was an incredible candidate, and she was a great friend."

== Political candidacy ==
With D–F–L, Green, Independence, and Legal Marijuana Now! parties Overby ran for offices including:

- United States Representative from Minnesota's 2nd congressional district in 2014, 2016, 2020, and 2022
- United States Senator in 2018, and 2020

== See also ==
- Cannabis in Minnesota
- LGBTQ rights in Minnesota
