= 2019 Minnesota Senate district 11 special election =

2019 District 11 special election
- February 5, 2019

Minnesota Senate District 11
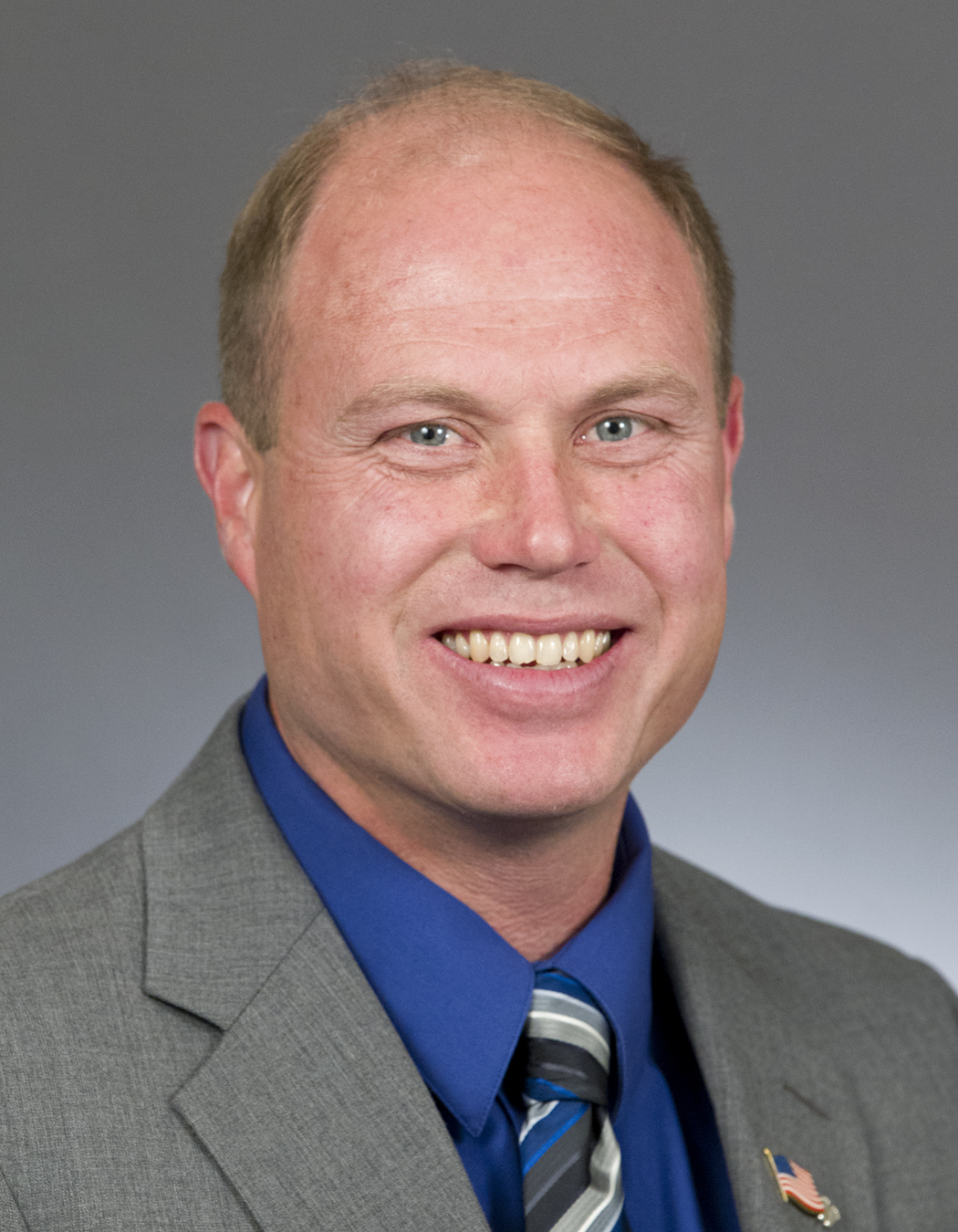

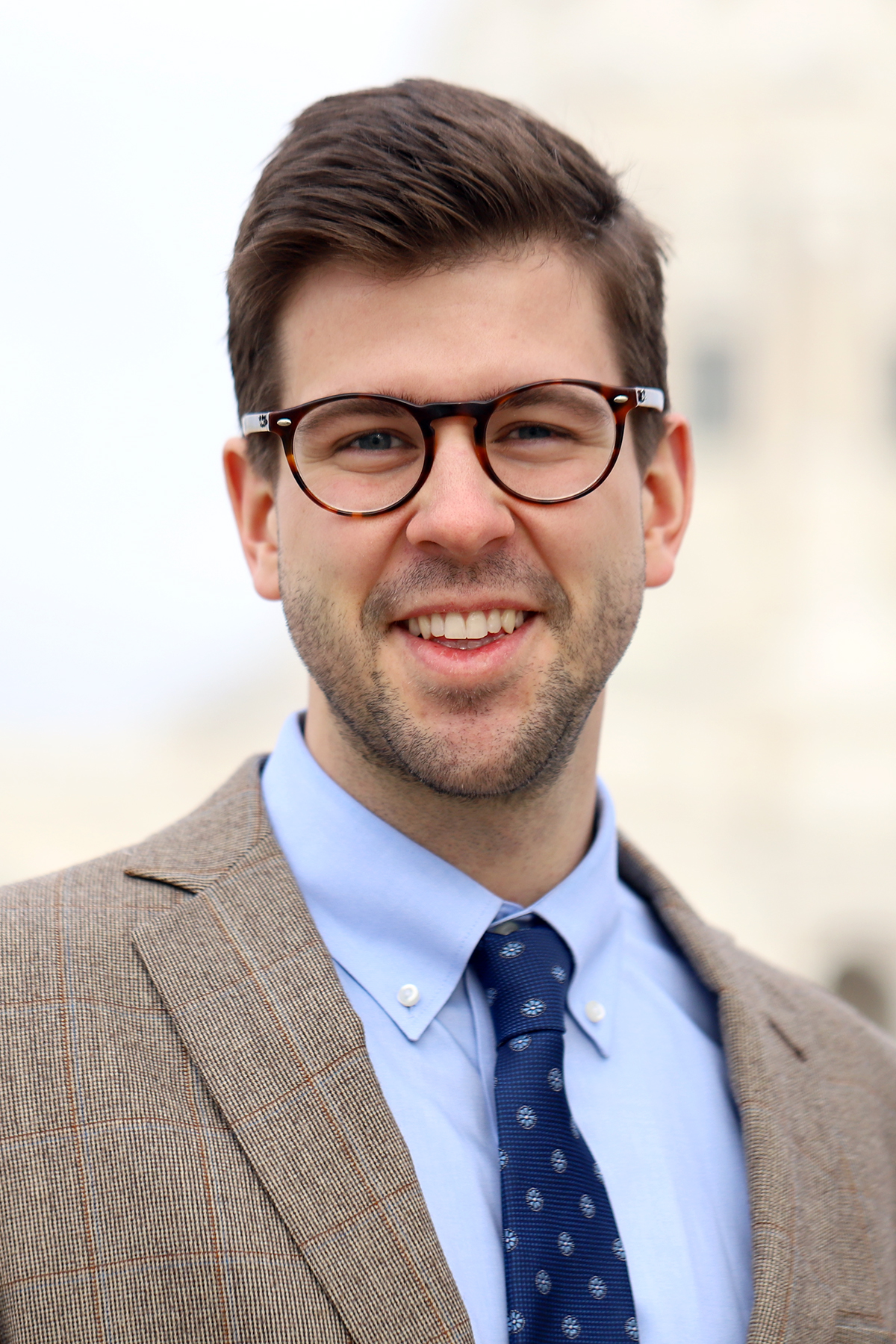
Nominee	Jason Rarick	Stu Lourey
Party	Republican	Democratic (DFL)
Popular vote	8,127	7,171
Percentage	52.02%	45.90%
- Precinct Results Rarick: 50–60% 60–70% 70–80% 80–90% 90–100% Lourey: 40–50% 50–60% 60–70% 70–80% 80–90% 90–100%
Senator before election
Tony Lourey
Democratic (DFL)
Elected Senator
Jason Rarick
Republican

A special election was held in the U.S. state of Minnesota on February 5, 2019, to elect a new senator for District 11 in the Minnesota Senate, caused by the resignation of Democratic–Farmer–Labor (DFL) Senator Tony Lourey effective on January 3, 2019, to be appointed as commissioner of human services in Governor Tim Walz's cabinet. A primary election was held on January 22, 2019, to nominate a DFL candidate. Jason Rarick, the Republican nominee, won the special election. Rarick's win caused a special election for the seat he held in the Minnesota House of Representatives.

== Background ==
Results by Precinct in 2016: Lourey: 50-60%; 60-70%; 70-80%; 80-90%; 90-100%; Cummins: 50-60%; 60-70%; 80-90%; No Vote

District 11 includes all of Carlton and Pine counties, the eastern half of Kanabec County, and a small part of southern St. Louis County in east-central Minnesota. Lourey first represented the area when it was District 8 after winning election in 2006, succeeding his mother, Becky Lourey, who did not seek re-election. In the last election in 2016, Lourey won with 55 percent of the vote.

== Candidates ==
The candidate filing period was from January 4 to January 8, 2019.

=== Minnesota Democratic–Farmer–Labor Party ===
The Senate District 11 DFL held a convention to endorse a candidate in Barnum on January 19, 2019. Michelle Lee won the endorsement over Stu Lourey. Lourey conceded the endorsement after Lee received just one vote less than the 60 percent of votes needed to win outright out of more than 150 delegates. Lourey said after the convention he would continue to campaign for the DFL nomination in the primary election.

==== Declared ====
- Michelle Lee, former Duluth area television news anchor; candidate for Minnesota's 8th congressional district in 2018
- Stu Lourey, legislative aide for U.S. Senators Al Franken and Tina Smith; son of Tony Lourey

=== Republican Party of Minnesota ===
District 11 Republican delegates held a convention to endorse a candidate in Hinckley on January 8, 2019. District 11B Representative Jason Rarick won the endorsement over deputy chair of the Eighth Congressional District Republicans Justin Krych. Mayor of Pine City Carl Pederson and Mathias Shir did not receive any votes. All candidates who were not endorsed agreed to withdraw their candidacies.

==== Declared ====
- Jason Rarick, member of the Minnesota House of Representatives for District 11B since 2015

==== Withdrawn ====
- Justin Krych, deputy chair of the Eighth Congressional District Republicans; candidate for Minnesota Senate District 7 in 2002
- Carl Pederson, mayor of Pine City since 2015
- Matthias Shir, electrical engineer

=== Legal Marijuana Now Party ===
- John Birrenbach, business and marketing consultant; Independent Grassroots Party candidate for U.S. president in 1996; Independence Party candidate for Minnesota House of Representatives District 65B in 2000

== Primary election ==
=== Results ===
Results by county: Lourey: 50-60%; 60–70%; 70-80%; 80-90%; 90-100%; Tie: 50%; Lee: 50-60%; 60-70%; 70-80%; 80-90%; 90-100%; No Vote

Party	Candidate	Votes	%
Minnesota Democratic–Farmer–Labor Party	Stu Lourey	1,932	53.21
Minnesota Democratic–Farmer–Labor Party	Michelle Lee	1,699	46.79
Subtotal		3,631	100.00
Republican Party of Minnesota	Jason Rarick	689	100.00
Legal Marijuana Now Party	John Birrenbach	69	100.00
Total		4,389	100.00
Invalid/blank votes		235	5.08
Turnout (out of 45,985 registered voters)		4,624	10.06
Source: Minnesota Secretary of State

=== Late ballots ===
Prior to the primary election, some voters voting by mail expressed concerns they would not receive their ballots or their ballots would not arrive in time to be counted. Carlton County's auditor said the short time frame of the special election and supply shortages made it difficult to promptly mail ballots. Minnesota law requires, when a vacancy occurs while the Legislature is in session, that the governor issue a writ within five days of a vacancy occurring for a special election to be held within 35 days after the writ is issued. If a primary election is required, it must be held within 14 days before the special election.

Several hundred mail-in ballots did not arrive in time to be counted. In Carlton County, which had approximately 2,300 registered voters in mail-only precincts, 250 ballots arrived three days after the primary election and a further 12 three days later. In Pine County, which had 752 registered voters in mail-only precincts, a total of 43 ballots had arrived late as of three days after the primary election. Carlton County's auditor predicted as many as 400 ballots would arrive late. Minnesota Secretary of State Steve Simon said he would ask the Legislature to increase the time frame for holding future special elections given the number of late ballots.

== Results ==
Party	Candidate	Votes	%	+/−
Republican Party of Minnesota	Jason Rarick	8,127	52.02	+6.66
Minnesota Democratic–Farmer–Labor Party	Stu Lourey	7,171	45.90	–8.60
Legal Marijuana Now Party	John Birrenbach	298	1.91	+1.91
Write-ins		27	0.17	+0.03
Total		15,623	100.00	±0.00
Invalid/blank votes		25	0.16	–4.23
Turnout (out of 44,876 registered voters)		15,648	34.87	–46.86
Source: Minnesota Secretary of State

== See also ==
- 2019 Minnesota House of Representatives District 11B special election
- List of special elections to the Minnesota Senate
