= John Birrenbach =

American businessman

John "Sparky" Birrenbach
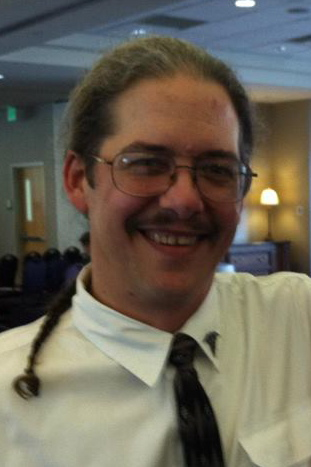
- Born: May 17, 1961 (age 65); Minnesota, United States
- Occupations: Business and marketing consultant
- Political party: Legal Marijuana Now
- Other political affiliations: Independence Party; Independent Grassroots

John "Sparky" Birrenbach (born May 17, 1961) is an American businessman, marketing consultant, writer, filmmaker, and marijuana rights activist.

Birrenbach, who founded the Institute for Hemp, was named High Times magazine's 1993 Freedom Fighter of the Year. He was the Independent Grassroots Party's nominee for US President in 1996.

== Life and activism ==
Birrenbach, former owner of the Saint Paul business Executive Tea and Coffee, told a reporter that he was arrested for marijuana possession in the 1980s.

Birrenbach, a former United States Navy Corpsman who served from 1979 to 1985 and was honorably discharged in September, 1983, founded the Institute for Hemp in 1987, a nonprofit industrial hemp research organization.

In 1990, Birrenbach applied for a permit to harvest wild hemp in Minnesota, and was denied. And, in 1991, Birrenbach applied to the Minnesota Department of Agriculture for a permit to grow hemp.

A father of two, Birrenbach has written for High Times and The Denver Post.

=== Political career ===
Birrenbach participated in a hemp festival held in Rochester, Minnesota, in 1992.

In 1996, Birrenbach, known to supporters as "Hemp John", ran for President of the United States as a nominee of the Independent Grassroots Party, on a ticket with George McMahon for Vice President.

Birrenbach was a candidate in the 2000 Minnesota House of Representatives election for the Independence Party, running in District 65B.

In 2019, Birrenbach was a candidate for Minnesota Senate in the District 11 special election to replace Tony Lourey, who resigned to become Commissioner of the Minnesota Department of Health and Human Services. Birrenbach represented the Legal Marijuana Now Party, which became a major party in Minnesota on January 1, 2019.
