= Legal Marijuana Now Party =

American political party advocating cannabis legalization

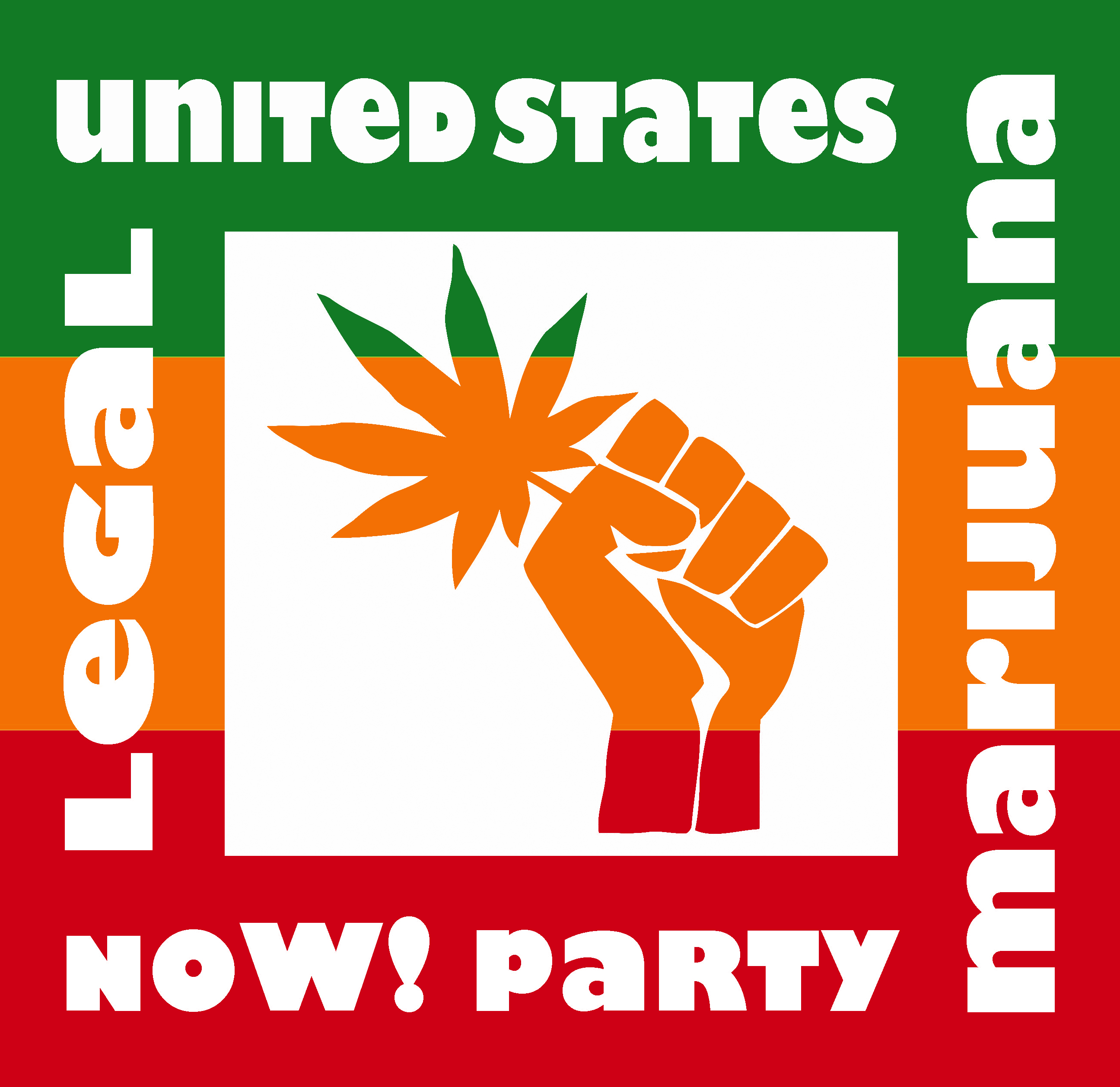
- Abbreviation: LMN
- Chairperson: Rudy Reyes (2024–present); Krystal Gabel (2021–2023)
- Founder: John Birrenbach; Mark Elworth; Krystal Gabel; Oliver Steinberg; Marty Super; Dan Vacek; Edward Williams
- Founded: 1998; 28 years ago
- Preceded by: Independent Grassroots (1996–1997)
- Headquarters: San Diego
- Newspaper: Freedom Gazette
- Ideology: Cannabis legalization
- Colors: Green, gold, red

Website
- www.legalmarijuananowparty.com

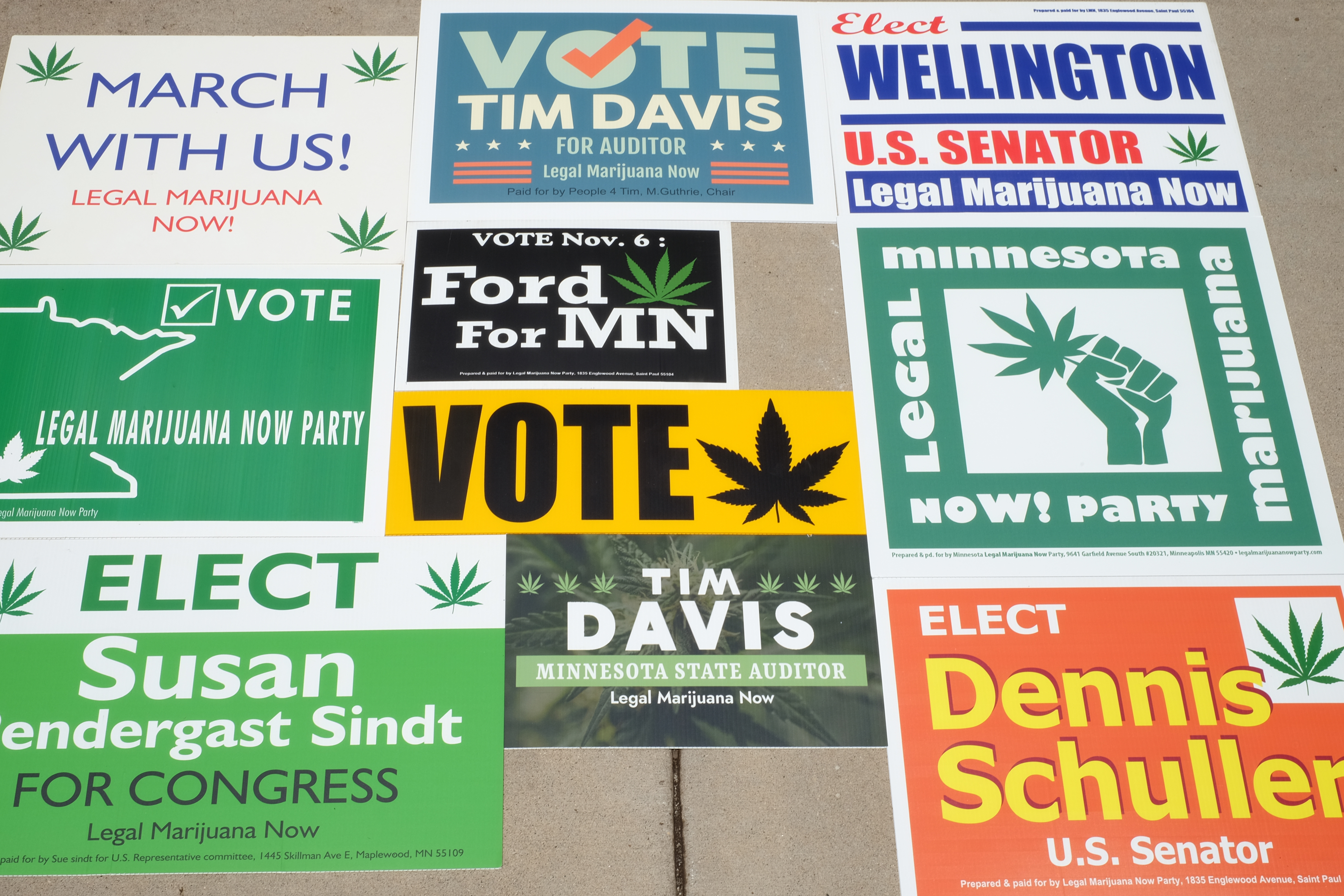
Legal Marijuana Now Party sign assortment, circa 2016—2024

The Legal Marijuana Now Party (LMN) is a political third party in the United States. The party's platform includes abolishing the Drug Enforcement Administration and legalizing hemp and marijuana. As of 2026, the party is formally recognized in Minnesota and has ballot access in Nebraska.

The Legal Marijuana Now Party was established in Minnesota in 1998 to oppose marijuana prohibition. In 1996, the Grassroots Party of Minnesota split, with some former members forming the Independent Grassroots Party. By 1998, members of the Independent Grassroots Party formed the Minnesota Legal Marijuana Now! Party. In the 2010s the party began expansion attempts to other states, gaining presidential election ballot access in Iowa for the 2016 election by petition. The party continues expansion in the 2020s, gaining ballot access in Nebraska as the Nebraska Legal Marijuana NOW Party in 2021.

== History ==
=== Background ===
The Minnesota Grassroots Party was formed in 1986 as a response to Ronald Reagan's war on drugs. In 1996 the party split, with some former members forming the Independent Grassroots Party for one election cycle.

=== Early Minnesota party (1998–2014) ===
In 1998, members of the Independent Grassroots Party formed the Minnesota Legal Marijuana Now! political party. The party's name, according to Yippie Oliver Steinberg, a Grassroots Party founder, is attributed to Dan Vacek saying to him that if you want every vote to be a referendum, every vote to be indisputable evidence there’s a voter who wants legal marijuana, "then call it the Legal Marijuana Now Party."

=== Expansion to other states ===
==== Nebraska expansion ====
The Nebraska Legal Marijuana NOW Party petitioned to be recognized as a major political party. To make the ballot, Legal Marijuana NOW Party needed valid signatures equal to at least one-percent of the total votes cast for governor in 2014, or 5,397 signatures statewide. In July, 2016, volunteers turned in 9,000 signatures to the Nebraska Secretary of State. However, the Secretary of State said that half of the signatures were invalid, verifying only 4,353 signatures and falling short of the 5,397 needed. After failing to make it onto Nebraska ballots in 2016, the party began circulating petitions for 2020 ballot access for a Nebraska Legal Marijuana NOW Party in September, 2016. The party planned to collect 15,000 signatures for their second attempt at gaining ballot access, and Nebraska Legal Marijuana NOW Party succeeded by 2021, after more than five years of petitioning.

== State party activity ==
=== Minnesota ===
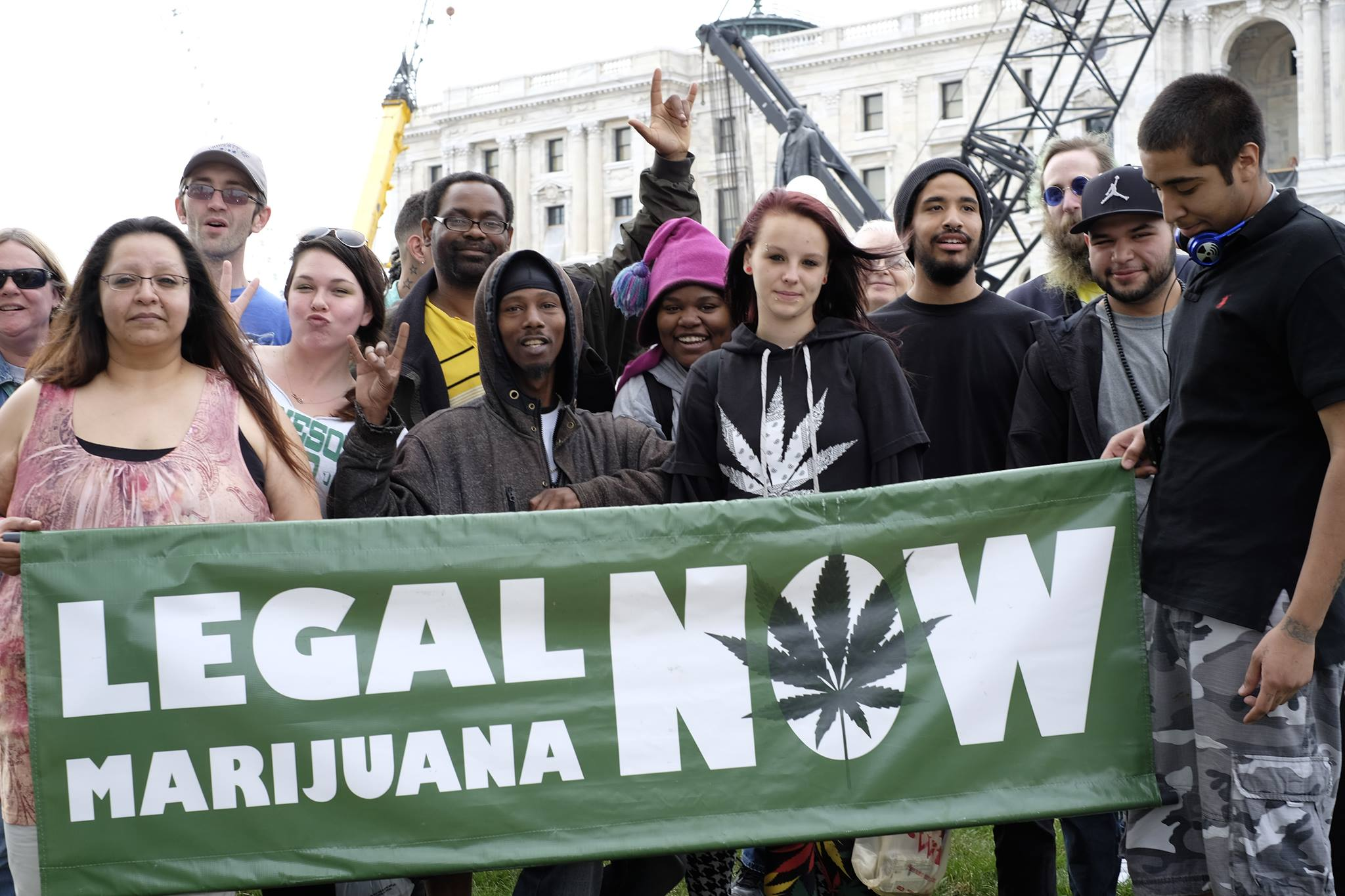
Legal Marijuana Now! Party at the Minnesota State Capitol in Saint Paul, April 20, 2016

In 2014, Dan Vacek ran for Minnesota Attorney General as the Legal Marijuana Now! candidate and got 57,604 votes, qualifying the party to be officially recognized and to receive public funding from the state.

Minnesota Legal Marijuana Now! nominated candidates by petition to appear on the ballot for the November 6, 2018 election. Their candidate for State Auditor, Michael Ford, received 5.3% of the vote qualifying the party to be an official major party in the state. This gave Legal Marijuana Now! candidates ballot access without having to petition.

In 2020, the Minnesota Legal Marijuana Now! candidate for United States Senator extended ballot access for the Minnesota party through 2024 by receiving 190,154 votes, more than any other such third-party candidate in the U.S. During the 2020 election campaign, Democratic Party leaders said that the Legal Marijuana Now Party made it harder for Democratic candidates to win in Minnesota. A St. Cloud Times analysis of votes cast in the 2020 general election in Minnesota found that Legal Marijuana Now! candidates might have helped DFL candidates in swing districts, by pulling a larger number of votes from Republican candidates.

Tim Davis, who was Minnesota Legal Marijuana Now! Party chair at the time, was the party's 2022 State Auditor nominee. To qualify for a share of the state's elections funding intended to help regular Minnesotans run for office, Davis raised $6000 before the July deadline, meeting State requirements to publicly report his fundraising income and campaign expenditures. Davis used the $28,000 Minnesota subsidy to print and distribute pro-cannabis legalization campaign fliers door to door, across the state. Davis got 87,386 votes in the November 2022 State Auditor race, short of the 5% threshold to major party status needed for extending Minnesota Legal Marijuana Now! Party ballot access through 2026.

Paula Overby was nominated by Minnesota Legal Marijuana Now! Party, in 2022, to run for U.S. Representative from the 2nd congressional district. Overby, an information technology director, had previously been nominated by Legal Marijuana Now! for the 2nd district, in 2020, after candidate Adam Weeks' untimely death. Overby's platform included marijuana legalization and universal Medicare. On October 5, 2022, Overby died during recovery in a hospital following emergency surgery for a heart valve condition. Minnesota Secretary of State Steve Simon stated that Overby's name would remain on the ballot, and the election would go ahead as scheduled. Without remedy for replacing their deceased nominee, under state law, Legal Marijuana Now! Party encouraged supporters to cast their votes for Overby. The dead candidate got 10,728 votes in the race.

Scholars have credited the work of Minnesota Legal Marijuana Now! with motivating the state Democratic Party to prioritize cannabis legalization, in 2023. In 2024, the Minnesota Supreme Court ruled that Legal Marijuana Now! no longer qualified for major party ballot access under a 2023 law passed by the Minnesota Legislature, and LMNP candidates would be required to petition during the two week filing window in May. Edina, Minnesota author Anthony Walsh, who had launched an independent LMNP campaign for United States Representative a year earlier, was denied by Minnesota Secretary of State Simon for not having the 1,000 signatures needed by June 4, so Walsh instead ran a 2024 write-in campaign for Congress in CD-3. In 2026, Walsh ran for Hennepin County District 3 Commissioner, attempting to unseat incumbent Commissioner Marion Greene. Walsh was eliminated in the August 11 primary, finishing third in the contest between six contenders for two spots on November general election ballots.

=== Nebraska ===
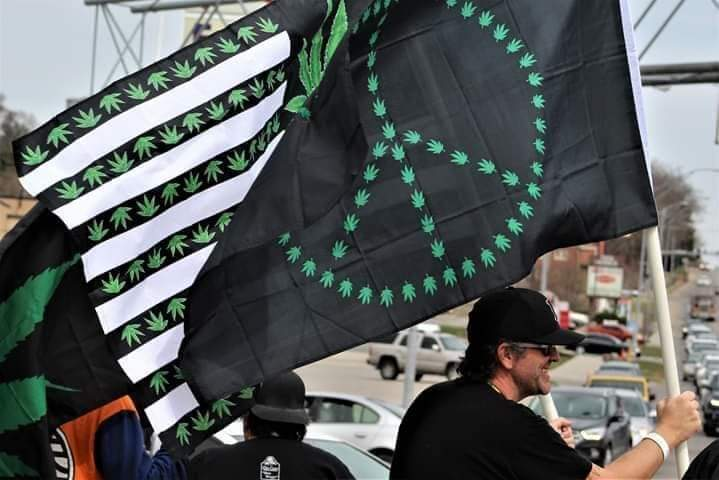
Nebraska Legal Marijuana NOW supporter with cannabis peace flag at rally in Omaha, April 20, 2018

On April 21, 2021, Legal Marijuana NOW gained official recognition as a state political party in Nebraska, earning the party ballot access for their candidates, and allowing Legal Marijuana NOW Party to register voters.

Nebraska Legal Marijuana NOW Party ran more candidates for statewide offices, in 2022, than the Nebraska Democratic Party recruited. Larry Bolinger was nominated by Legal Marijuana NOW to run for Nebraska Attorney General in 2022. Bolinger, who previously had run for a seat on the Alliance Planning Commission, focused his campaign on legalization of marijuana and expanding drug courts.

In the 2022 race, Bolinger received 188,648 votes, more than 30 percent, the highest percentage for a statewide Nebraska candidate running outside the two major parties in 86 years, when independent George Norris was reelected to U.S. Senate, in 1936. Bolinger, who was one of the top three independent and third party vote-getters in the U.S. in 2022, held the Nebraska record until Dan Osborn received 46.5% for United States Senator, in 2024.

Nebraska LMNP held a U.S. Senate primary on May 14, 2024, between Kerry Eddy and Kenneth Peterson. Eddy, the winner of the primary, withdrew from the race in July and endorsed independent candidate Osborn over anti-cannabis incumbent Republican senator Deb Fischer. No LMNP presidential candidates were recognized for the 2024 Nebraska primaries by Secretary of State Bob Evnen. At an online meeting of Nebraska party officers in June, independent presidential candidate Cornel West was endorsed for 2024 Nebraska ballots.

In 2025, Nebraska Legal Marijuana NOW Party surpassed 10,000 registered party voters, giving LMNP candidates Nebraskan ballot access indefinitely.

Rick Beard, an Omaha chef and winery operator, was nominated for Governor of Nebraska by LMNP voters in the May 12, 2026, primary. Beard's running mate, Omaha Housing Authority commissioner Keenya Barnes, serves as Omaha Performing Arts, Omaha by Design, and Table Grace Ministries community ambassador. The winner of the U.S. Senate primary, retired bus driver and labor union leader Mike Marvin, suspended his campaign in August, endorsing independent Osborn for U.S. Senator, though Marvin's name remains on November ballots. Overton cattle rancher David Else was nominated by Legal Marijuana NOW for U.S. Representative from Nebraska's 3rd congressional district, in 2026.

== U.S. presidential candidates ==
=== 2016–2020 ===
In 2016, Legal Marijuana Now placed their presidential candidates, Dan Vacek and Mark Elworth, on the ballot in two states, Iowa and Minnesota, and as a write-in candidate elsewhere. Vacek finished tenth out of 31 candidates for president nationwide.

California archeologist Rudy Reyes was nominated by the Legal Marijuana Now Party, in 2020, to run for Vice-president of the United States, but the campaign was postponed until 2024.

=== 2024 U.S. presidential elections ===
The Minnesota Legal Marijuana Now! primary was held on Super Tuesday, March 5, 2024. Twenty Minnesota presidential delegates to the national LMNP convention were awarded proportionally by the primary results, at the state party convention in Caledonia held on May 8.

==== 2024 Minnesota presidential primary ====
Minnesota Legal Marijuana Now primary, March 5, 2024
Candidate	Votes	Percentage	Delegates				
Candidate	Votes	Percentage	Delegates	Krystal Gabel (withdrawn)	759	28.84%	-
Dennis Schuller	459	17.44%	7				
Vermin Supreme	397	15.08%	6				
Rudy Reyes	365	13.87%	5				
Edward Forchion	168	6.38%	2				
Willie Nelson (write-in)	19	0.72%	0				
Other write-ins	465	17.67%	-				
Total:	2,632	100.00%	20				

==== 2024 national convention ====
Because Minnesota is more populous, the state's delegates awarded to Richfield businessman Dennis Schuller and Reyes based on the March Minnesota primary results outnumbered the Nebraska delegation which had earlier been pledged unanimously to Cornel West by Nebraska party leaders. The national LMNP convention held in Bloomington, Minnesota on July 6 nominated Schuller and running mate Reyes for the party's presidential ticket, and the 2024 LMNP write-in campaign was certified in several states.

== Electoral history ==
=== Minnesota federal and statewide office electoral history ===
==== 1998—2016 ====
Year	Office	Candidate	Popular votes	Percentage
1998	U.S. Representative, MN-04	Dan Vacek	5,839	2.40%
2014	Minnesota Attorney General	Dan Vacek	57,604	2.99%
2016	U.S. Representative, MN-04	Susan Pendergast Sindt	27,152	7.71%
2016	U.S. Representative, MN-05	Dennis Schuller	30,759	8.50%

==== 2018—2022 ====
Year	Office	Candidate	Popular votes	Percentage
2018	U.S. Senator	Dennis Schuller	66,236	2.55%
2018	U.S. Senator (special)	Sarah Wellington	95,614	3.70%
2018	U.S. Representative, MN-04	Susan Pendergast Sindt	13,776	4.19%
2018	Minnesota State Auditor	Michael Ford	133,913	5.28%
2020	U.S. Senator	Kevin O’Connor	190,154	5.92%
2020	U.S. Representative, MN-02	Adam Charles Weeks	24,751	5.83%
2020	U.S. Representative, MN-05	Michael Moore	29,537	9.54%
2020	U.S. Representative, MN-07	Slater Johnson	37,979	4.87%
2022	U.S. Representative, MN-01 (special)	Richard Reisdorf	1,545	1.30%
2022	U.S. Representative, MN-01	Richard Reisdorf	6,389	2.15%
2022	U.S. Representative, MN-02	Paula Overby	10,728	3.30%
2022	U.S. Representative, MN-07	Travis "Bull" Johnson	16,421	5.37%
2022	Minnesota Governor	James McCaskel	29,346	1.17%
2022	Minnesota State Auditor	Tim Davis	87,386	3.55%

=== Nebraska federal and statewide office electoral history ===
Year	Office	Candidate	Popular votes	Percentage
2022	U.S. Representative, NE-03	Mark Elworth Jr.	13,015	5.90%
2022	Nebraska Attorney General	Larry Bolinger	188,648	30.27%
2022	Nebraska Auditor of Public Accounts	L. Leroy Lopez	120,986	19.32%

=== 2016 U.S. presidential election ===
Year	Candidate	VP candidate	Ballot access	Popular votes	Percentage	National rank
2016	Dan Vacek of Minnesota	Mark Elworth of Nebraska	IA, MN	13,537	0.01%	10th of 31

== Platform ==
The Legal Marijuana Now Party's platform centers around marijuana legalization, including hemp legalization. The party has advocated legalizing the home cultivation of marijuana and expunging past cannabis convictions. It has also advocated broader anti-drug prohibition policies including abolishing the Drug Enforcement Administration and banning employee drug testing.

The party defines its platform as the United States Bill of Rights in its constitution.

== Structure and composition ==
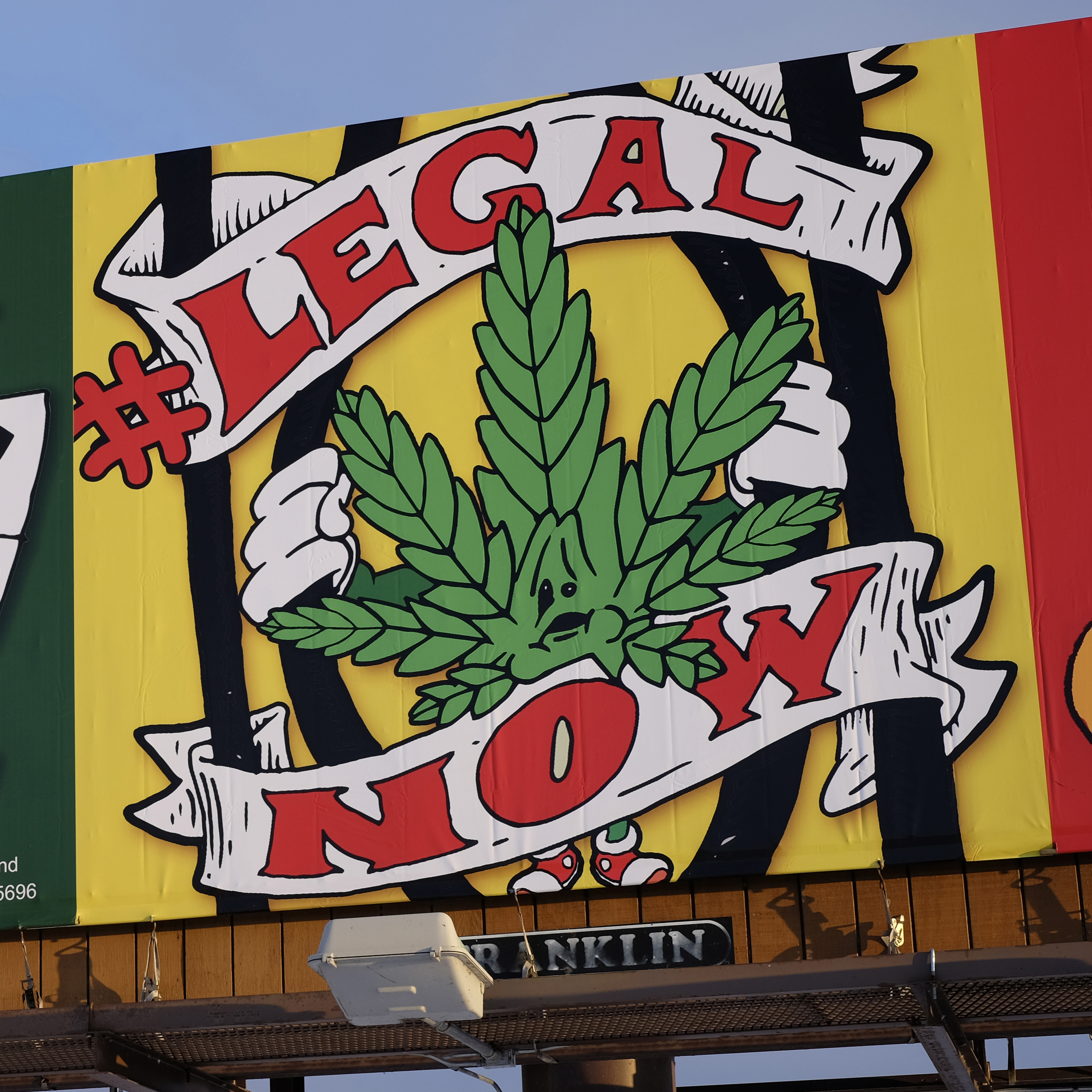
Legal Marijuana Now Party mascot, Marvelous Leaf, on Highway 10 Ramsey, Minnesota billboard, 2016

=== Movement ===
Grassroots organizations are associated with bottom-up rather than top-down decision making. The Legal Marijuana Now Party seeks to engage ordinary people in political discourse to the greatest extent possible.

=== Leadership ===
All decisions on important organizational and financial subjects must be reached by a leadership Head Council, which consists of Legal Marijuana Now Party members with at least three consecutive years participation in the party and officers elected by the members at an annual convention held in July.

Krystal Gabel, of Nebraska, was appointed to national Legal Marijuana Now Party chairperson in 2021 through 2023. Rudy Reyes became party chairperson in 2024.

=== State and local chapters ===
State	Chapter Name	Status	Party activity start	Ballot access	Ballot access dates
Minnesota	Minnesota Legal Marijuana Now Party	Active	1998	No	1998, 2014–present
Nebraska	Nebraska Legal Marijuana NOW Party	Active	2016	Yes	2021–present
Iowa		Unknown	2016	No	2016 (presidential)

== See also ==
- Cannabis political parties of the United States
