= Tim Davis (activist) =

American cannabis activist (born 1955)

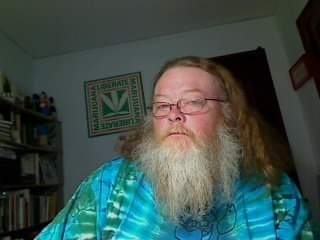

Personal details
- Party: Legal Marijuana Now
- Other political affiliations: Grassroots (2010–2012); Green (2000–2008); Grassroots (1986–1998); Socialist (1974–1984); Yippie (1969–1972)
- Known for: Cannabis rights activism

Timothy A. Davis (born September 24, 1955) is an American cannabis rights activist and politician. A founding member of the Grassroots Party in 1986, Davis was the party's candidate for Minnesota Lieutenant Governor in 1994, and United States Senator in 1996 and 2012.

Davis helped establish a Saint Louis, Missouri, chapter of the National Organization for the Reform of Marijuana Laws in the 1970s. He headed the Minnesota branch of the organization during the 1980s and 1990s.

== Early career ==
Davis volunteered for the Missouri chapter of NORML beginning in the mid-1970s, for more than ten years, until he moved to Minnesota.

Davis worked as a radio disc jockey from 1979 to 1986. Davis interviewed medical marijuana patient Robert Randall, among others, in 1979, on KOEL-FM Radio.

== Activism ==
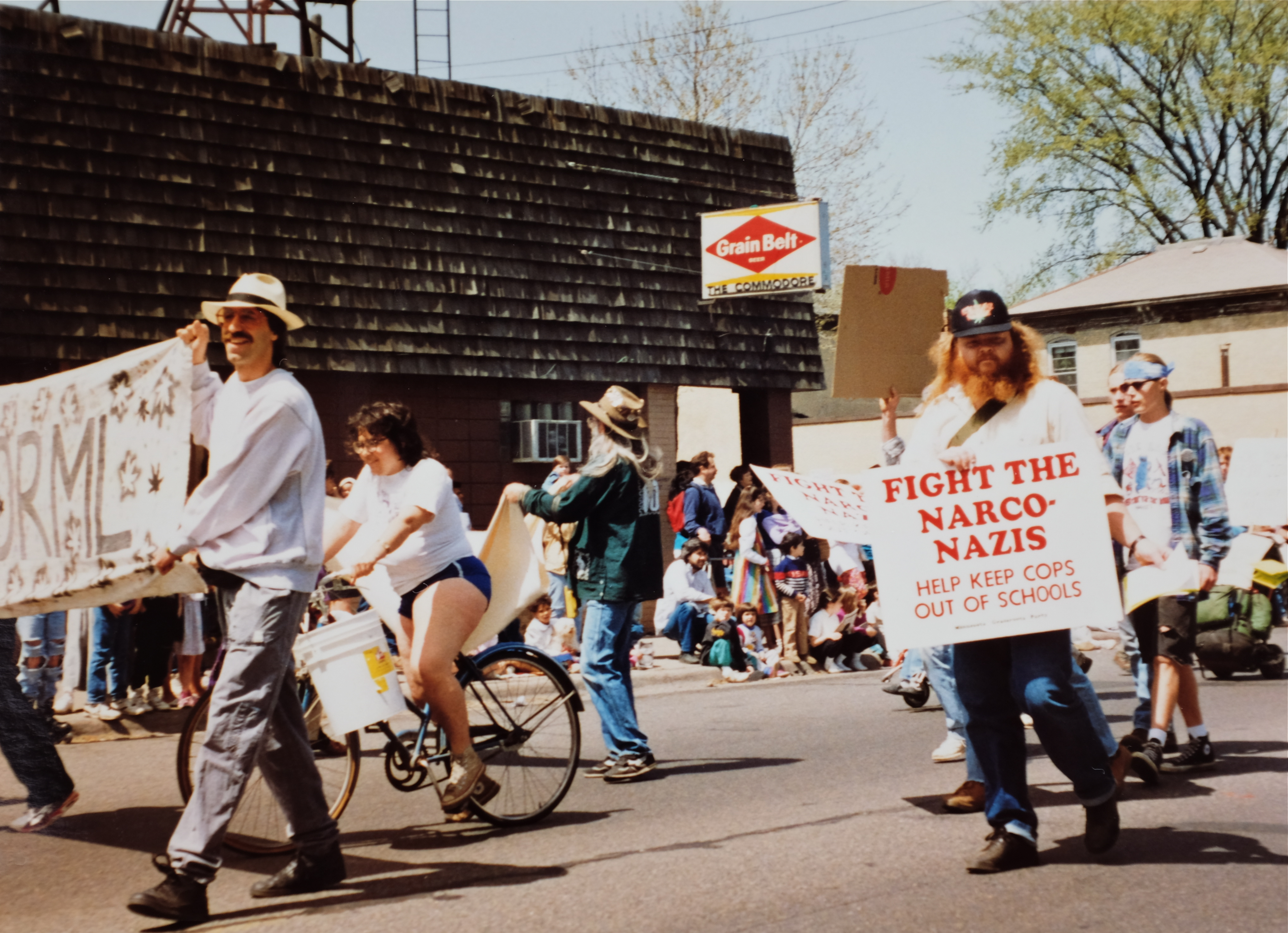
Davis marching with NORML in the Minneapolis MayDay Parade, 1991

=== Grassroots Party ===
Davis was a founding member of the Grassroots Party and was Party chair throughout the 1990s. He was the party’s candidate for State Representative (District 59B) in 1990, Minnesota Lieutenant Governor in 1994, and United States Senator in 1996.

Davis was the Grassroots Party nominee for United States Senator in 2012 and received 30,531 votes.

=== Minnesota NORML ===
Davis led the Minnesota chapter of the National Organization for the Reform of Marijuana Laws for over a decade, from the late 1980s until 2000s.

=== Minnesota Greens ===
In 2002, Davis ran for U.S. Congress from District 5 as the Green Party candidate and received 17,800 votes. His campaign included reducing government military spending in order to raise public education funding, and removing influences corporations have over universities. Davis worked in the campaigns for Ralph Nader in 2000, and 2004.

=== Legal Marijuana Now Party ===
From 2020 through 2023, Davis served as chairperson of the Minnesota chapter of the Legal Marijuana Now Party. He took part in LMNP's legal battle over the 2020 election in Minnesota's 2nd congressional district after the LMNP candidate died four weeks before the election took place.

Davis was 2022 Legal Marijuana Now! Minnesota State Auditor nominee. Davis met a $6,000 fundraising requirement before the summer deadline to receive a publicly-funded state campaign subsidy, receiving over $1,000 from GOP donors in the final days of the fundraising campaign. Davis paid $25,750 to Ground Game LLC, owned by Republican political activist Paul Tuschy, to door knock on his behalf. When asked whether he was concerned Republicans were using him to blunt Julie Blaha's re-election campaign, Davis told Minnesota Reformer, "We’re being taken advantage of by Republicans and Democrats." Davis agreed that GOP donations appeated suspicious. Blaha also told Reformer that she thought that Davis believed in his cause. Davis received 87,386 votes in the November 2022 State Auditor election.
