= George McMahon (activist) =

American cannabis rights activist (1950–2019)

- Born: 1950
- Died: November 30, 2019 (aged 69)
- Occupation: Writer
- Known for: Medical marijuana patients’ rights
- Notable work: Prescription Pot: A Leading Advocate's Heroic Battle to Legalize Medical Marijuana
- Political party: Grassroots

George McMahon (1950–2019) was an American cannabis rights activist.

== Life and activism ==
George McMahon was one of the last surviving patients enrolled in the federal Compassionate Investigational New Drug Program that began providing cannabis to patients in 1978. He lived with extreme pain caused by a rare genetic condition called nail-patella syndrome and used cannabis to treat its symptoms.

McMahon, who lived in Iowa, traveled widely for speaking engagements. He served on the board of the group Patients Out of Time.

McMahon died on November 30, 2019, at the age of 69.

== Political candidacy ==
McMahon was the Independent Grassroots Party candidate for Vice-president of the United States in 1996, and the Grassroots Party candidate for vice-president in 2012.

== Writings ==
McMahon co-authored the book Prescription Pot: A Leading Advocate's Heroic Battle to Legalize Medical Marijuana.
