= Rudy Reyes (activist) =

American politician (born 1977)

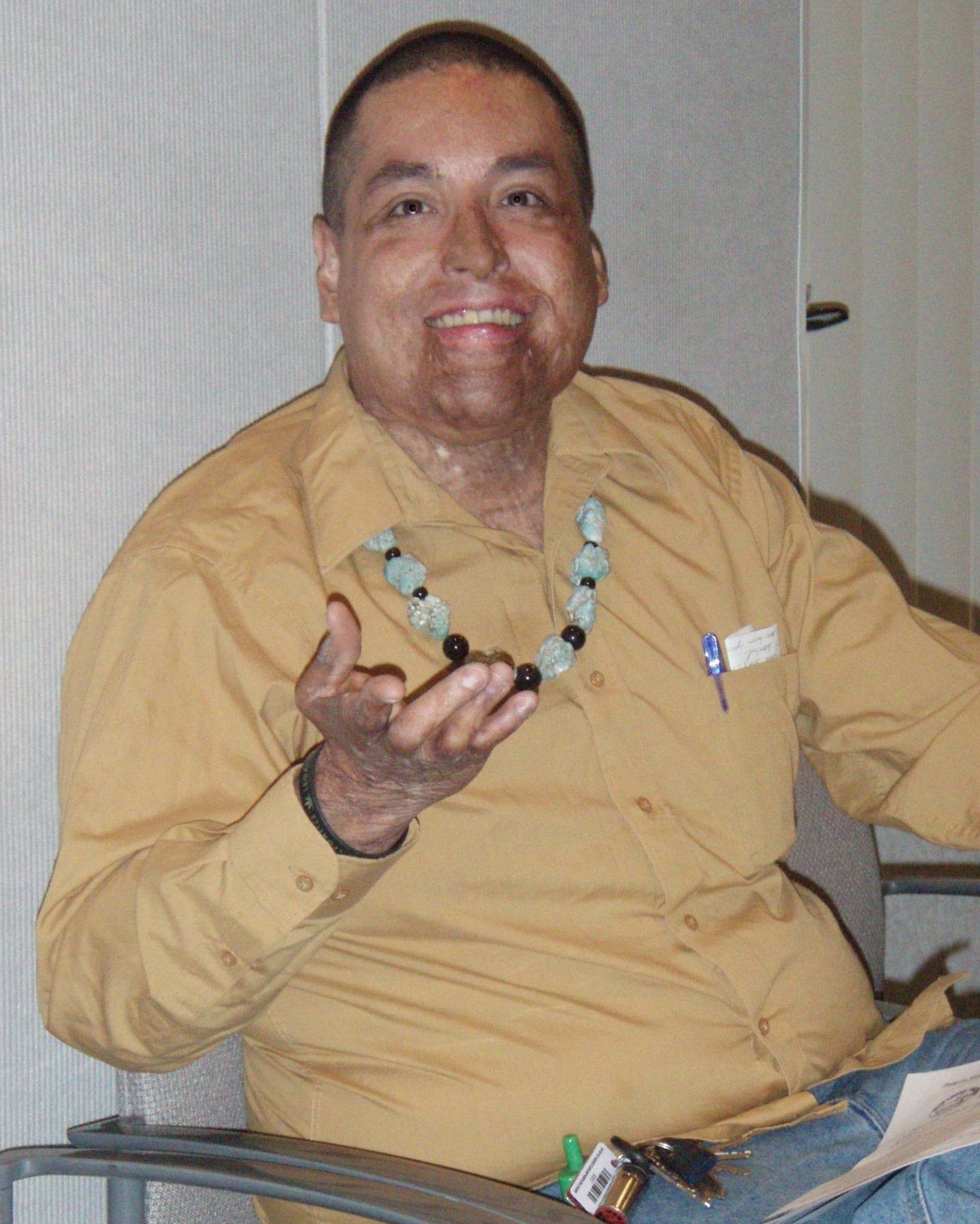
- Rudy Reyes in Santee, California, 2011
- Born: February 27, 1977 (age 49); Sacramento, California
- Education: San Diego State University (BS); California Western School of Law (JD)
- Occupations: Science teacher, chef
- Known for: Cannabis rights activism
- Political party: Legal Marijuana Now
- Other political affiliations: Democratic

Rudy Reyes (born February 27, 1977) is an American teacher, actor, archaeologist, cannabis rights activist, and chef. Reyes was a contestant in the reality television competition, MasterChef, on the show's fourth season.

Californian Reyes, known for his bravery during the Cedar Fire of 2003, volunteers as a mentor for young burn survivors, and spokesperson for United Way and the Burn Institute.

== Cedar Fire survivor ==
Heroism during 2003 wildfire

A resident of San Diego County, California, Reyes became known for his role in the Cedar Fire of 2003. During the fire, he helped others get to safety first, before he was trapped by the fire. Reyes soaked himself in the shower, and ran more than a mile through the fire. He sustained burns over approximately 70 percent of his body, and lost one ear and part of a finger.

Reyes has had numerous surgeries and uses cannabis salve to aid healing of his skin. According to Reyes, vaporized marijuana was more effective than other drugs prescribed for pain while he was hospitalized.

== Early activism ==
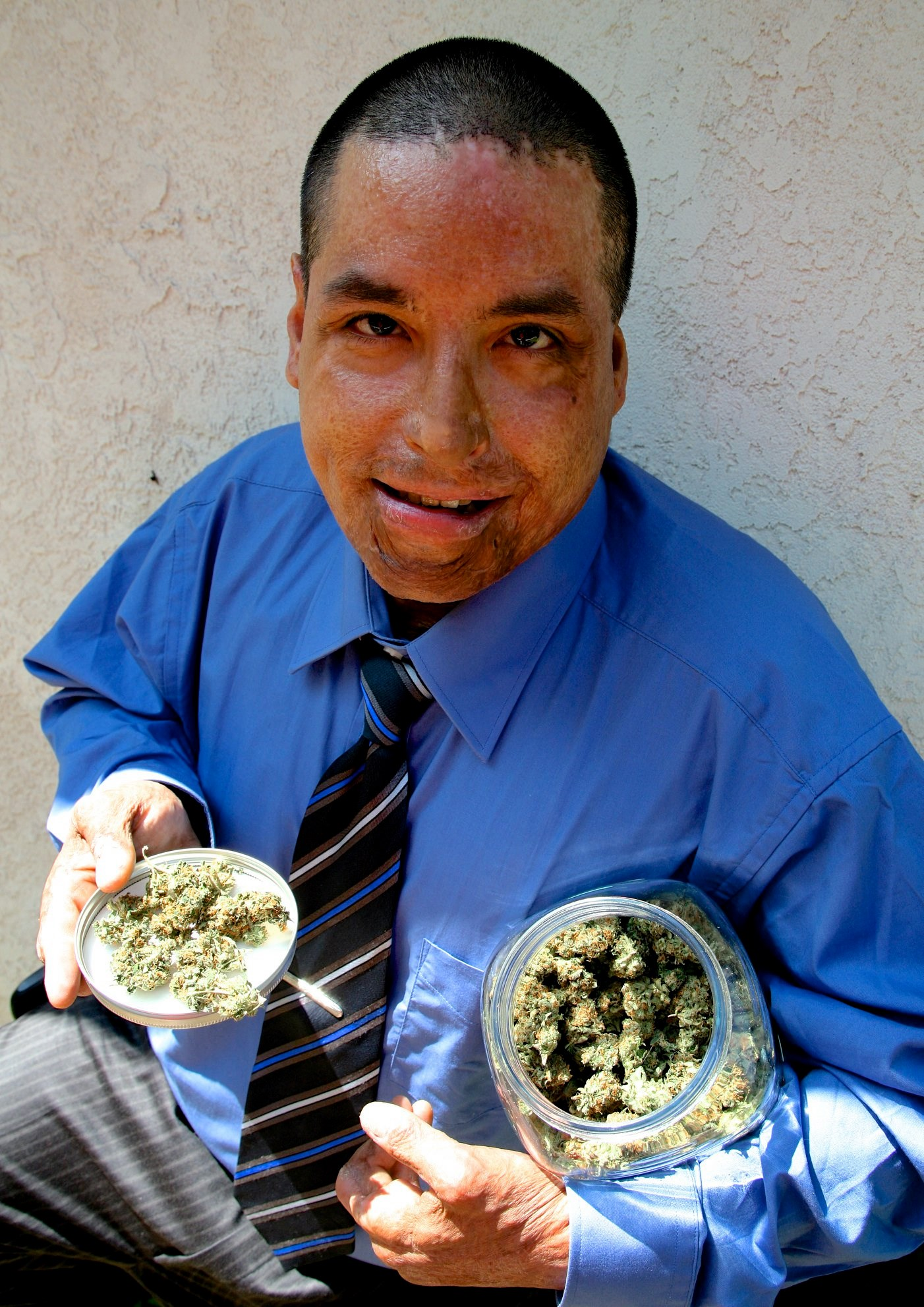
Rudy Reyes in San Diego, California, 2009

After the Witch Creek wildfire burned San Diego County again four years later in 2007, Reyes became critical of his representative on the San Diego County Board of Supervisors, Dianne Jacob, for her vote to spend the county's resources to file a lawsuit against California's medical marijuana law, Proposition 215, which was passed by voters in 1996, rather than using the public's money to build a hospital and for fire prevention.

Reyes ran against Jacob and lost, but Reyes received more than 20,000 votes, about 22 percent, in the June 3, 2008, election.

== 2010s career ==
=== How Weed Won the West film appearance ===
While making the cannabis documentary How Weed Won the West, in 2010, Reyes worked with producer and director Kevin Booth, and was featured portraying himself in the film.

=== 2010—2012 candidacies ===
Reyes ran for Santee, California, City Council in 2010, San Diego County Board of Supervisors in 2012, and for Santee Mayor, against 12-year incumbent Randy Voepel, in 2012.

=== Quail Brush power plant critic ===
In 2012, archeologist Reyes testified against the Quail Brush power plant proposed in San Diego, near Santee, which was opposed by the Santee City Council.

=== 2013 MasterChef contestant ===
Reyes appeared as a contestant in the reality television competition, MasterChef, on the premiere episode of the show's fourth season.

=== 2016 San Diego County Board of Supervisors candidate ===
Reyes ran for San Diego County Board of Supervisors, District 2, in 2016 and lost. The only Democratic candidate to face Republican incumbent Jacob, Reyes campaigned for increased fire protections and to make medical marijuana more accessible. In the June 7 primary, Reyes received more than 38,000 votes, almost 27 percent.

=== 2018 Santee City Council candidate ===
In 2018, Reyes ran unsuccessfully for District 2 Santee City Council. He was endorsed by the San Diego Democratic Party. Reyes received 1,510 votes, more than 31 percent, in the November 6 general election.

== 2020s activism ==
=== Vice-presidential campaigns ===
Reyes, who previously was nominated by the Legal Marijuana Now Party in 2020 to run for Vice-president of the United States, was a candidate in the 2024 Minnesota Legal Marijuana Now presidential primary held on Super Tuesday. Reyes received 365 votes on March 5, approximately fourteen percent, in the 6-way race. Minnesota businessman Dennis Schuller, the 2024 LMNP presidential nominee, picked Reyes for his running mate, in May, and their November 5 write-in campaign was certified in several states and territories.

== Personal life ==
Rudy Reyes, of the Barona Band of Mission Indians, graduated from El Capitan High School in Lakeside, California. He holds degrees in archeology and anthropology from San Diego State University, and a degree from California Western School of Law. Reyes serves as national chairperson for the Legal Marijuana Now Party.

== Political candidacy ==
Rudy Reyes has run for public office several times, including:

- San Diego County Board of Supervisors in 2008, 2012, and 2016
- Santee, California, City Council in 2008, 2010, and 2018
- Santee Mayor, in 2012

== Television and film ==
Rudy Reyes, who had a role as himself in the 2010 documentary film How Weed Won the West, was a contestant in the television competition, MasterChef, on the first episode in Season 4 of the American reality show, in 2013.
