= Independent Grassroots =

American political party advocating marijuana legalization

- Founder: John Birrenbach; Oliver Steinberg; Dan Vacek
- Founded: 1996
- Dissolved: 1998
- Preceded by: Grassroots Party
- Succeeded by: Legal Marijuana Now Party
- Ideology: Marijuana legalization
- Colors: Green

Independent Grassroots was a moderate, democratic socialist political third party in the U.S. state of Minnesota created in 1996 to oppose drug prohibition. The group shared many of the progressive values of the Farmer-Labor Party but with an emphasis on cannabis/hemp legalization issues.

Some political scholars have speculated that Minnesota's marijuana political parties are responsible for the state DFL Party embracing cannabis legalization two decades later.

== History ==
The Youth International Party, formed in 1967 to advance the counterculture of the 1960s, often ran candidates for public office. The Yippie flag is a five-pointed star superimposed with a cannabis leaf. Following the Yippie Party's lead, the Grassroots Party was established in Minnesota, in 1986, as an independent political party that focused on marijuana legalization.

In 1996, the Minnesota Grassroots Party split, forming Independent Grassroots. John Birrenbach was the Independent Grassroots presidential candidate and George McMahon was its vice-presidential candidate. Dan Vacek was the Independent Grassroots candidate for United States Representative (Minnesota District 4). In 1998, members of Independent Grassroots established the Legal Marijuana Now political party.

== 1996 U.S. presidential candidates ==
=== Independent Grassroots results in presidential elections ===
Year	Candidate	VP candidate	Ballot access	Popular votes
1996	John Birrenbach of Minnesota	George McMahon of Iowa	MN	787

== 1996 results in Minnesota elections ==
=== Results in federal elections ===
Year	Office	Candidate	Popular votes	Percentage
1996	United States Representative, District 4	Dan Vacek	2,696	1.05%

== See also ==
- Cannabis political parties of the United States
