= Marion Greene =

American politician

Member of the Hennepin County Board of Commissioners from the 3rd district
- Incumbent
- Assumed office 2014

Member of the Minnesota House of Representatives from the 60A district
- In office January 4, 2011 – January 7, 2013
- Preceded by: Margaret Anderson Kelliher
- Succeeded by: district redrawn

Personal details
- Born: July 16, 1970 (age 56)
- Party: Democratic-Farmer-Labor
- Spouse: Bart Cannon
- Children: 2 stepdaughters
- Education: Swarthmore College; University of Texas
- Profession: health policy analyst, legislator

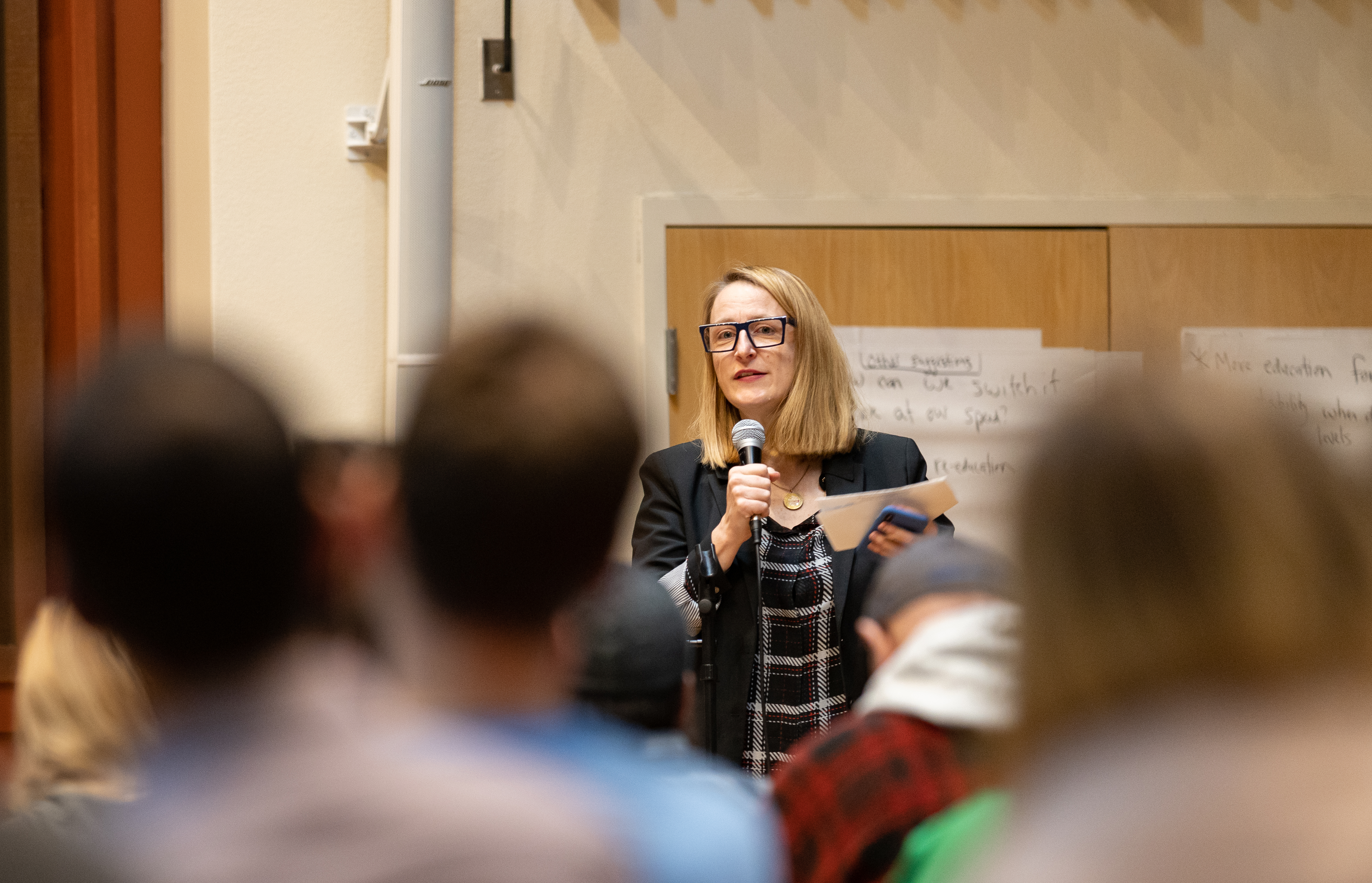
A “Lyndale Avenue Listening Session” held by Marion Greene at SpringHouse Ministry Center in Minneapolis, Minnesota, on December 2, 2019

Marion C. Greene (born July 16, 1970) is a Hennepin County commissioner (District 3) and a former member of the Minnesota House of Representatives who represented District 60A, which included portions of the city of Minneapolis in Hennepin County, which is in the Twin Cities metropolitan area. A Democrat, she was a health policy analyst for St. Jude Medical in Little Canada.

Greene was first elected to the House in 2010. She served on the Government Operations and Elections and the State Government Finance committees, and on the Environment, Energy and Natural Resources Policy and Finance Subcommittee for the Legacy Funding Division. Because of redistricting, she was placed in competition with Frank Hornstein, also a DFL legislator, in the redrawn 61A district. She was not endorsed by the party for a second term, and did not compete in the primary election.

Greene grew up outside of the United States, as her parents served in the United States Foreign Service. She attended Westtown School, a small boarding school outside of West Chester, Pennsylvania, and was the co-class president of the Class of 1988. Then she attended college at Swarthmore College in Swarthmore, Pennsylvania, then moved to Washington, D.C., where she joined the Center for Science in the Public Interest, a non-profit watchdog and consumer advocacy group. She later worked for the Friends Committee on National Legislation, a public lobby organization founded by the Religious Society of Friends. In the mid-1990s, she worked for the Democratic Party’s Coordinated Campaign in New Mexico, then as a Democratic Caucus analyst for the New Mexico House of Representatives Voters and Elections Committee.

After earning her M.B.A. from the University of Texas in Austin, Greene moved to the Twin Cities, where she worked in marketing for Pillsbury and General Mills before shifting to the medical device industry, working for Guidant and St. Jude Medical.
