= Cannabis political parties of the United States =

American cannabis political party history

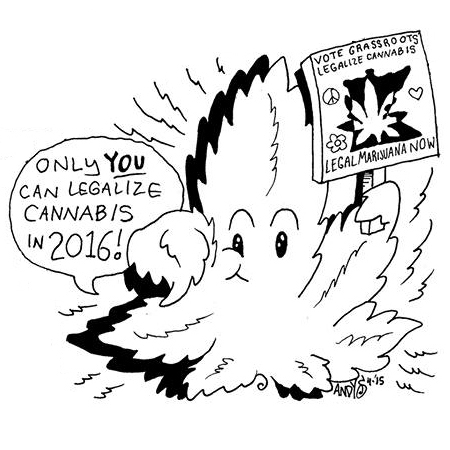
Legal Marijuana Now Party mascot, Marvelous Leaf, circa 2015

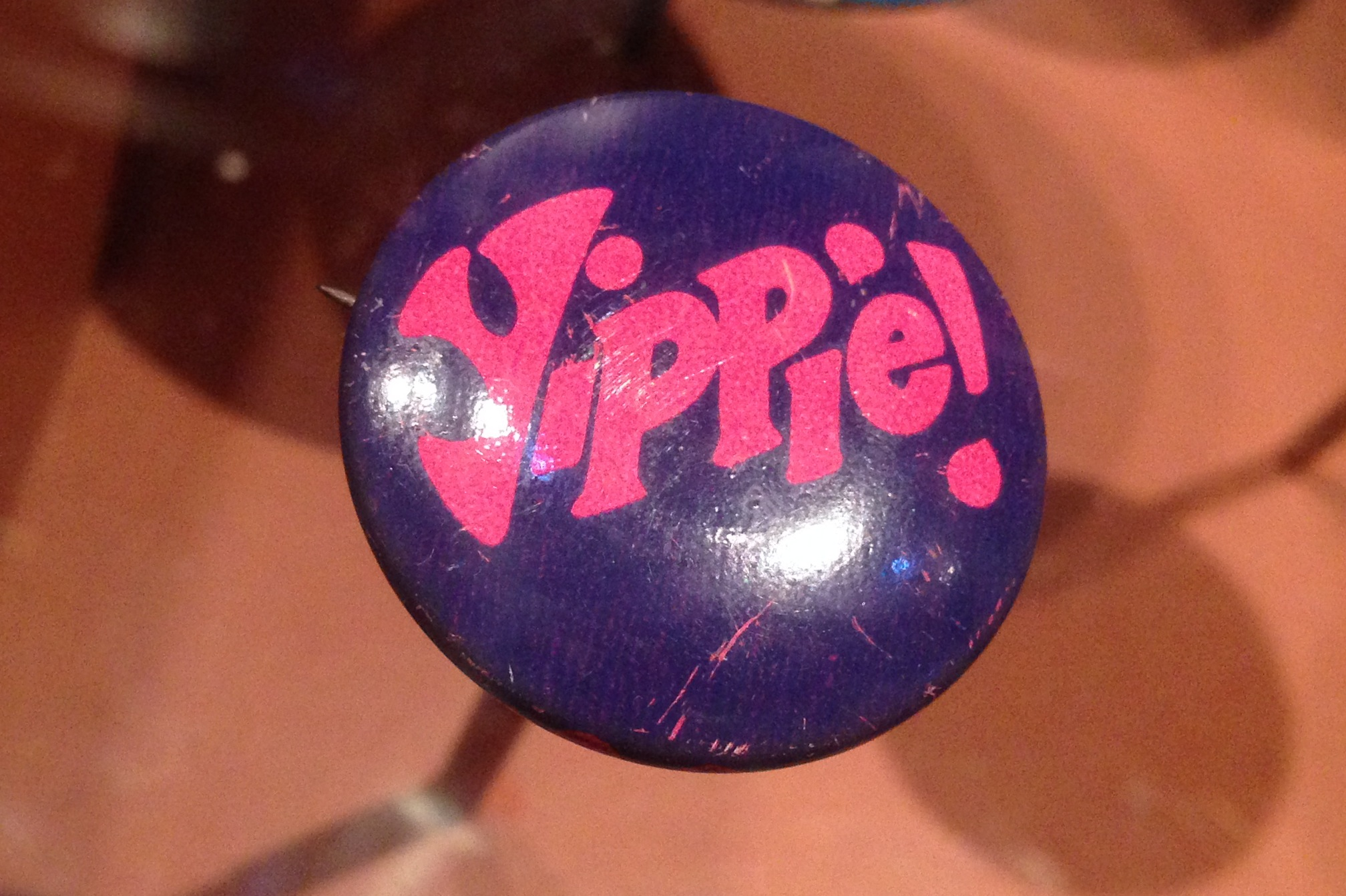
1960s Youth International Party “Yippie!” pin on display at the Chicago History Museum

Cannabis political parties of the United States include the Legal Marijuana Now Party, and the U.S. Marijuana Party. Also, both the Libertarian Party and the Green Party advocate for the legalization of marijuana.

Other cannabis political parties that were active in the past have included the Anti-prohibition Party, the Grassroots Party, the Marijuana Reform Party, and the Youth International Party. Marijuana political parties have flourished in U.S. states, including Iowa, Minnesota, Nebraska, New Jersey, New York, and Vermont.

Modern cannabis parties in the United States are typically single-issue political parties, with a broad range of histories dating back to the 1960s, across America.

== Objectives and results ==
In Minnesota, the cannabis party candidate for United States Senator received 190,000 votes in 2020, more votes than any other such third-party candidate in the nation, and more votes than the winner, Democratic Senator Tina Smith, led her Republican challenger.

2022 Minnesota State Auditor nominee Tim Davis, who was state Legal Marijuana Now! Party chair at the time, qualified for a $28,000 share of Minnesota's elections funding intended to help regular Minnesotans run for office by meeting a $6000 fundraising requirement before the summer deadline and publicly reporting his budget and expenditures. Davis used the state subsidy to print and distribute pro-cannabis party campaign fliers door to door, across Minnesota. Davis received 87,000 votes in the November race.

Minnesota state marijuana parties were credited with motivating the Democratic Party to prioritize cannabis legalization, in Minnesota, in 2023. Minnesota Legal Marijuana Now! Party chairperson Dennis Schuller, who was 2020 LMN Minnesota State Representative nominee, in 2023 told a reporter that ending federal prohibition laws against cannabis, overseeing implementation of Minnesota's regulated market and expungement of past criminal records, were goals that remain for Legal Marijuana Now Party, in Minnesota, planning their ongoing campaigns.

In 2022, the Legal Marijuana NOW Party nominee for Nebraska Attorney General received 30 percent of the vote. In 2025, Nebraska Legal Marijuana NOW surpassed 10,000 registered party voters, earning LMNP candidates ballot access in Nebraska indefinitely.

== Criticisms ==
In 1998, Richard Hirsh of the New York Green Party tried to challenge nominating petition signatures of Marijuana Reform Party gubernatorial candidate Tom Leighton and remove Leighton's name from the November ballot, claiming Marijuana Reform and Green parties both appeal to the same liberal voters, competing for statewide ballot access.

While Edward Forchion was campaigning for governor of New Jersey as a Legalize Marijuana Party nominee, in 2005, his home was vandalized by someone who spray-painted a 6-foot cross together with the words “Get Jesus.” Described as a hate crime by Burlington County police who investigated the incident, Forchion told a reporter he thought he had been targeted for his Rastafari religious beliefs, and not because he is African American. In 2021, Forchion petitioned to run independently for New Jersey Governor as a "#Homegrow 4All" candidate, but the state Democratic Party challenged some of his signatures, forcing Forchion to withdraw from the race.

In 2020 and 2022, Minnesota Democratic–Farmer–Labor Party leaders warned that the cannabis party candidates could hurt Democratic Party nominees, but an analysis of votes cast in the 2020 elections found that the marijuana parties might have helped Democratic candidates in swing districts, by drawing at least as many or more votes from Republican-leaning voters, in 2020.

== Early history in the United States (1960s–1980s) ==
=== Youth International Party ===
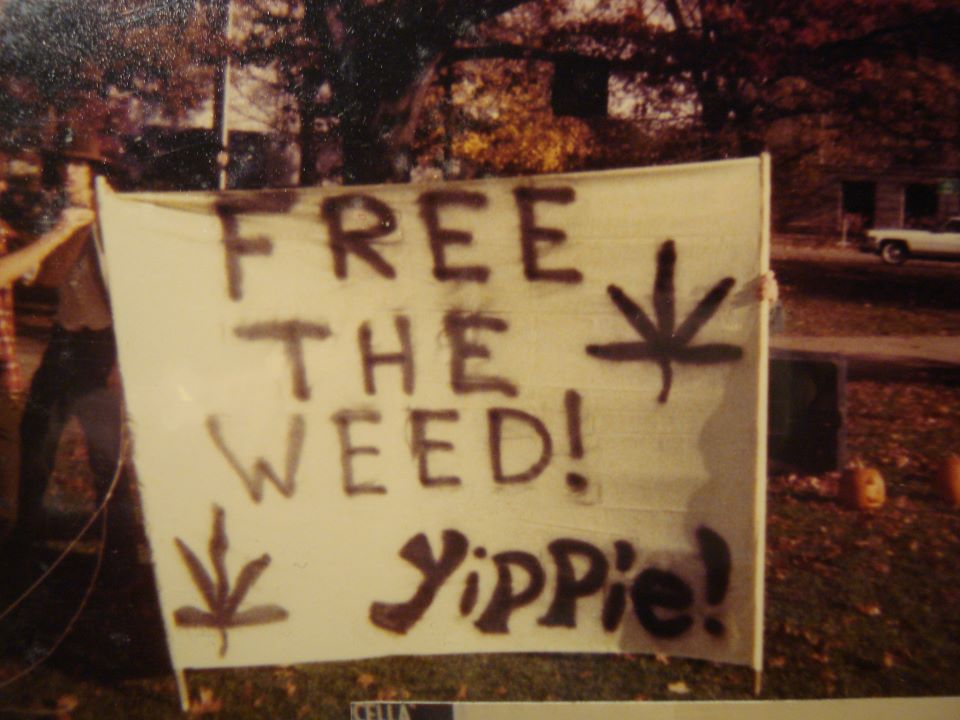
Yippie smoke-in "Free the Weed" banner in Columbus, Ohio, 1978

The Youth International Party was established in New York on New Year's Eve, 1967, by a group of writers and activists including Abbie Hoffman and Jerry Rubin, to advance the counterculture of the 1960s. The YIP flag is a five-pointed star superimposed with a cannabis leaf. Without formal membership or hierarchy, the Yippie movement spread across U.S. states, and into other nations. In 1976, yippies, known for their sense of humor, direct actions and satirical, elaborate pranks, ran Nobody for President with the slogan “Nobody's perfect!” Yippies tailored colorful, theatrical acts exploiting mass media, which included political pie throwing carried out the first time in 1969, and notably the pie thrown in the face of a member of the President's Commission on Obscenity and Pornography by Yippie underground publisher Tom Forçade, in 1970.

The yippies’ direct actions took center stage during the 1968 Democratic National Convention in Chicago. YIP planned a six-day Festival of Life – a celebration of the counterculture and a protest against the state of the nation. Yippies’ sensational statements before the convention were part of the theatrics, including a tongue-in-cheek threat to put LSD in Chicago's water supply. YIP organizers hoped that well-known musicians participating in the 1968 Democratic National Convention protest activity would draw an enormous crowd from across the country, but the city of Chicago refused to issue any permits for the event and most musicians withdrew from the project. Of the headlining rock bands who had agreed to perform, only MC5 came to Chicago to play and their set was cut short by a clash that was called a police riot by the US National Commission on the Causes and Prevention of Violence, between the audience of a couple thousand and police. Phil Ochs and several other singer-songwriters also performed during the 1968 Yippie Festival of Life.

YIP organized marijuana “smoke-ins” across North America through the 1970s and into the 1980s. A yippie smoke-in held in Washington, D.C. on July 4, 1970, was attended by 25,000. A Youth International Party smoke-in in Vancouver on August 7, 1971, was attacked by police, resulting in the Battle of Maple Tree Square police riot. Annual July 4 Yippie smoke-ins held in Washington became a counterculture tradition by 1979 which continued to be held for decades, evolving into annual summer Million Marijuana Marches by 1999. YIP promoted the creation of alternative, counterculture institutions such as artist collectives, food co-ops, flea markets, free clinics, pirate radio, public-access television. Yippies worked together with other overlapping and intermingling counter-cultural groups that included Deadheads, the Rainbow Family, and White Panthers, believing cooperative alternative institutions could spread to dwarf and eventually replace capitalist economic systems.

=== Grassroots Party ===
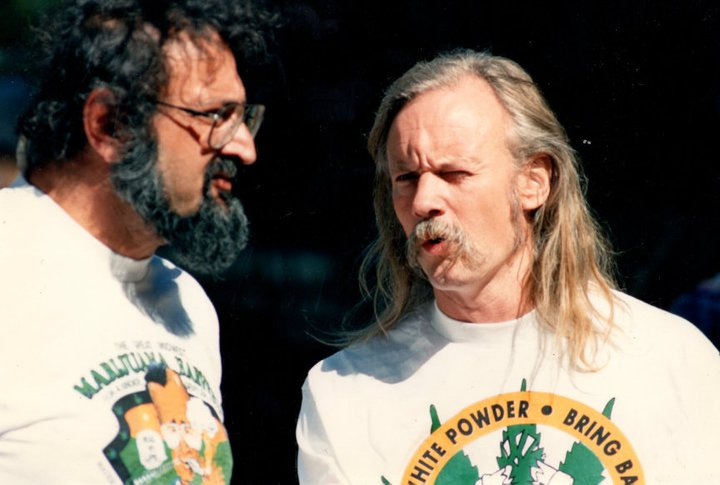
Jack Herer, left, and Dana Beal, 1988 Grassroots Party nominees for U.S. President and Vice-president

The Grassroots Party, founded in Minnesota in 1986, often ran candidates for state and federal offices. The party was active in Iowa, Minnesota, and Vermont. Grassroots Party nominated candidates for every presidential election from 1988 to 2000.

Jack Herer, author of The Emperor Wears No Clothes, was Grassroots Party presidential nominee in 1988, and 1992. GRP nominated businessman Dennis Peron, who in 1991 opened the San Francisco Cannabis Buyers Club, America's first public cannabis shop, to run for president in 1996.

The Vermont Grassroots Party was established in 1994. Robert Melamede, a genetic researcher and microbiologist whose views promoting the curative properties of cannabis put him at odds with mainstream academia, was Grassroots nominee for U.S. Senator and U.S. Representative from Vermont, in 1994, 1996, and 1998. Three Vermont Grassroots candidates won five percent or more of the popular vote in the 1996 elections, qualifying the GRP for ballot access, in Vermont, until 2002.

Russell Bentley, a Grassroots nominee for US Senate in 1990 and U.S. Congress in 1992 and Minnesota Grassroots Party board member, was arrested on marijuana smuggling charges in 1996. Bentley was sentenced to five years in federal prison. In 2000, Minnesota GRP nominated Minneapolis playwright David Daniels as candidate for U.S. Senate. Daniels received 21,447 votes.

In 1996 the Minnesota Grassroots Party split, forming the Independent Grassroots for one election cycle. John Birrenbach was the Independent Grassroots U.S. presidential nominee and George McMahon was their vice-presidential nominee.

== Post-1990 developments ==
=== Grassroots–Legalize Cannabis Party ===
The Grassroots–Legalize Cannabis Party was founded in Minnesota, in 2014. The group was established by Oliver Steinberg who together with others, Tim Davis, Derrick Grimmer, and Chris Wright, had previously founded the Grassroots Party of Minnesota, in 1986. Grassroots–Legalize Cannabis Party attained ballot qualified status in Minnesota when, in 2018, their Attorney General candidate, who dropped out of the race to support the Democratic candidate but whose name remained on ballots, received 5.7 percent of the vote.

In January 2023, Grassroots–Legalize Cannabis Party chairperson Oliver Steinberg told the Minnesota Senate Public Safety Committee that marijuana prohibition has not kept people from using the drug, but has “succeeded perhaps in terrorizing or intimidating citizens, in canceling civil liberties, blighting both urban and rural communities, all without eradicating the outlawed substance.” Steinberg, who was 2020 G—L C Party nominee for U.S. Senator, wrote in Star Tribune, “cannabis prohibition never was necessary; always was unjust and unjustifiable; and always lacked moral authority because it was actually designed to serve as a legal mechanism for racial repression.”

=== Legalize Marijuana Party ===
The New Jersey Legalize Marijuana Party was established in 1998 by Edward Forchion to protest cannabis prohibition. In Minnesota, the Legal Marijuana Now! Party was founded the same year. Forchion ran under the Legalize Marijuana banner for US Representative in 1998, Camden County Freeholder in 1999, New Jersey Governor in 2005, and United States Senator in 2006.

=== Legal Marijuana Now Party ===
In 1998, members of the Independent Grassroots Party formed the Minnesota Legal Marijuana Now political party. According to the Legal Marijuana Now Party of Minnesota, a person's right to sell the products of their garden is protected by the Minnesota Constitution.

In 2014, the Legal Marijuana Now candidate for Minnesota Attorney General got 57,604 votes, qualifying the party to be officially recognized and to receive public funding from the state. In 2018, the LMN Party nominee for State Auditor, got 133,913 votes, 5.28 percent, qualifying Minnesota Legal Marijuana Now Party to have ballot access without petitioning. In 2020, the Minnesota LMN candidate for U.S. Senator secured ballot access for the party until 2024 by receiving 190,154 votes, more than any other such third-party candidate in the nation.

In 2021, Legal Marijuana Now Party expanded into Nebraska by collecting the signatures of 6,800 registered Nebraska voters. Wilber bowling alley proprietor Leroy Lopez ran for Nebraska Auditor of Public Accounts, in 2022. Lopez got 120,986 votes, finishing second in the three-way race. Larry Bolinger, of Alliance, was nominated by Legal Marijuana NOW to run for Nebraska Attorney General in 2022. Bolinger, received 188,648 votes, more than 30 percent, the highest share for a statewide Nebraska candidate running outside the two major parties in 86 years, when independent George Norris was reelected to U.S. Senate. Bolinger, who finished in the top three of U.S. independent and third party candidates, in 2022, held the Nebraska independent vote-getting record until Dan Osborn got 46.5% for United States Senator, in 2024..

Paula Overby, an information technology director and previous 2020 Legal Marijuana Now candidate, was nominated by Minnesota LMN Party, in 2022, to run for U.S. Representative from Minnesota's 2nd congressional district, known to be an independent stronghold. Overby, died On October 5, 2022. Without remedy for replacing their deceased nominee, under state law, Legal Marijuana Now encouraged supporters to cast their votes for Overby, whose name remained on ballots. A conservative political action committee, Right Now USA, supported the marijuana campaign, while the Minnesota DFL Party paid for advertisements against Legal Marijuana Now, in District 2. Overby, got 10,728 votes in 2022.

Legal Marijuana Now Party held a presidential primary in Minnesota, in 2024. Five candidates were on the March 5 ballot, New Jersey Rastafari businessman and activist Edward Forchion, Colorado activist Krystal Gabel, California archeologist and teacher Rudy Reyes, Minnesota small business owner Dennis Schuller, and Massachusetts performance artist Vermin Supreme. Reyes, a Native American of the Barona Band of Mission Indians, had previously been nominated for U.S. Vice-president by the party, in 2020. Minnesota presidential delegates to the national Legal Marijuana Now convention were awarded proportionally based on the primary results. Schuller and running mate Reyes were nominated for President and Vice-president at the national convention on July 6, and the 2024 Legal Marijuana Now presidential write-in campaign was certified in several states.

=== U.S. Marijuana Party ===
The U.S. Marijuana Party was formed in 2002 by Loretta Nall from Massachusetts following her misdemeanor arrest for marijuana possession. Nall was the chairperson of the party until 2004. Writer, military veteran, and former White Panther, Wayward Bill Chengelis was Colorado U.S. Marijuana Party chairman, from 2002 through 2021.

In 2004, Illinois U.S. Marijuana Party leader Richard Rawlings and another candidate, Brian Meyer, ran for United States Congress in Illinois’ 12th and Illinois’ 18th Congressional Districts as write-in candidates. Rawlings ran again as a Marijuana Party write-in candidate for Congress in 2010.

Independent candidate Cris Ericson, who ran for Governor of Vermont in 2002 as a “Make Marijuana Legal” candidate, was U.S. Marijuana Party nominee for Vermont governor and United States Senator in 2004, 2010, 2012, and 2016. Galen Dively ran for Vermont Senator, in 2016, as a Marijuana Party candidate and finished with 2,443 votes, or 9.5 percent.

== Activities at the state level ==
=== Colorado ===
In Colorado, military veteran, writer, and former White Panther, Wayward Bill Chengelis was U.S. Marijuana Party chairperson for two decades, from 2002 through 2021.

=== Iowa ===
Minnesota Grassroots Party founding member Derrick Grimmer moved to Iowa, in 1988, and formed the Grassroots Party of Iowa. In 1990, Grimmer ran for Iowa State Treasurer and received 15,745 votes, and in 1994 Grimmer received 2,282 votes in Iowa's 3rd congressional district U.S. House of Representatives race.

Grassroots Party placed their presidential candidates onto ballots in two states, Iowa and Minnesota, in 1992. Jack Herer, author of The Emperor Wears No Clothes: Hemp & The Marijuana Conspiracy, who had previously been the Grassroots presidential nominee in Minnesota, in 1988, was Grassroots presidential candidate in 1992. In 2016, the Legal Marijuana Now Party placed their presidential candidates onto the ballot in Iowa and Minnesota.

Mark Elworth, a resident of Council Bluffs, was nominated by petition to run independently for U.S. House of Representatives from Iowa's 3rd congressional district under the banner of “Legal Medical Now,” in 2018.

=== Illinois ===
In 2004, Illinois Marijuana Party leader Richard Rawlings ran for U.S. Congress in Illinois’ 18th Congressional District as a write-in candidate. Brian Meyer ran as a write-in candidate in the 12th Congressional District in 2004. Rawlings ran again as a Marijuana Party write-in candidate for Congress in 2010.

=== Minnesota ===
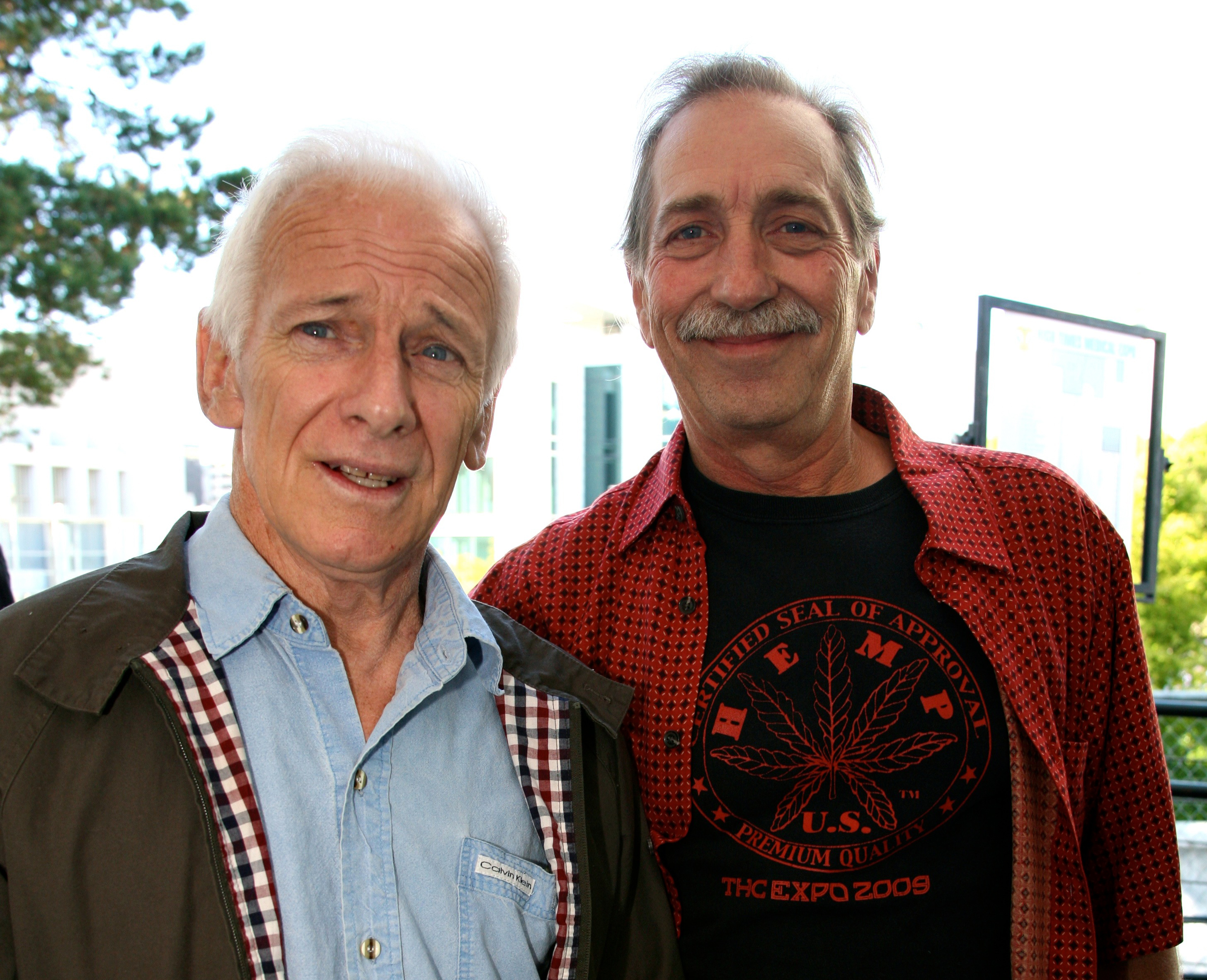
Dennis Peron, left, and Arlin Troutt, 1996 Grassroots Party nominees for U.S. president and Vice-president

==== 1986–1998 in Minnesota ====
The Grassroots Party was established in Minnesota in 1986, by Tim Davis, Derrick Grimmer, Oliver Steinberg, and Chris Wright, in response to Ronald Reagan's war on drugs. Derrick Grimmer, Ph.D., ran for Minnesota Attorney General in 1986. Grimmer received 16,394 votes.

Ross Culverhouse, a computer programmer and Vietnam veteran was the Grassroots gubernatorial candidate, in 1990. Culverhouse received 17,176 votes. Will Shetterly, a science-fiction writer and actor, ran for governor of Minnesota in 1994. He placed third out of six candidates.

In 1996, Grassroots Party placed their presidential candidates onto ballots in Minnesota and Vermont. Grassroots presidential nominee, businessman Dennis Peron, who in 1991 opened the first public American cannabis dispensary, the San Francisco Cannabis Buyers Club, received 5,378 votes. In 1996, Russell Bentley, a Grassroots nominee for US Senate in 1990 and U.S. Congress in 1992 and Minnesota Grassroots Party board member, was arrested on marijuana smuggling charges. Bentley was sentenced to five years in federal prison.

Minnesota businessman John Birrenbach, a U.S. Navy veteran known to supporters as "Hemp John", was the Independent Grassroots presidential nominee in 1996. In 1998, members of Independent Grassroots established the Legal Marijuana Now political party, in Minnesota.

==== 2000–2018 in Minnesota ====
Grassroots Party nominated David Daniels, an African American playwright from Minneapolis, in 2000, as candidate for U.S. Senate. Daniels received 21,447 votes. Chris Wright ran for Governor of Minnesota in 2010 as a Grassroots Party nominee, and in 2014 and 2018 as a Grassroots–Legalize Cannabis candidate.

In 2014, the Legal Marijuana Now candidate for Minnesota Attorney General got 57,604 votes, qualifying the party to receive public funding from the state.

The Grassroots–Legalize Cannabis Party was formed in Minnesota in 2014. In 2018, G—LC Party attained major party status in Minnesota when their Attorney General candidate, who dropped out of the race to support the Democratic candidate, but whose name nevertheless remained on ballots, received 5.7 percent of the vote. Shortly before Minnesota's May deadline to file such a change in time for 2022 elections, a Democratic Party activist, Marcus Harcus, who previously had been 2020 Grassroots–Legalize Cannabis nominee for state representative, attempted to hold a G—LC party meeting for the purpose of changing the Minnesota state G—LC party's name to a name the activist thought might help the D—F—L Party by attracting votes from Republicans.

In 2018, the Legal Marijuana Now nominee for State Auditor, Michael Ford, who is African-American, got 133,913 votes or 5.28 percent, qualifying Minnesota Legal Marijuana Now Party to have major party ballot access.

==== 2020–2022 in Minnesota ====
In 2020, the Minnesota Legal Marijuana Now candidate for United States Senator received 190,154 votes, more than any other such third-party candidate in the nation. The Legal Marijuana Now Party is credited with motivating the Democratic Party of Minnesota to prioritize the passage of a cannabis legalization law in the state, in 2023.

In Minnesota, Democrats have stated that cannabis political party candidates are detrimental to Democratic candidates, in tight races. An analysis of votes cast in the 2020 Minnesota elections found that Grassroots–Legalize Cannabis and Legal Marijuana Now candidates might have helped Democratic candidates in swing districts, by drawing as many or more votes from Republican voters.

In 2020, in Minnesota's 2nd congressional district where Democratic Representative Angie Craig was seeking re-election in a close race, Legal Marijuana Now candidate Adam Weeks died four weeks before the November 3 election, throwing the election into chaos because a Minnesota state law said that if a major party candidate died during an election campaign, a special election would be held. Federal judges ruled that the election should go ahead, so the name of the candidate who was nominated by Legal Marijuana Now Party to replace Weeks, was not on the ballot. State Legal Marijuana Now Party leaders encouraged their supporters to cast their votes for Weeks, in memoriam, and the dead candidate received 5.83 percent of votes in the three-way race.

Paula Overby, a supporter of Bernie Sanders, was nominated by Minnesota Legal Marijuana Now Party, in 2022, to run for U.S. Representative from Minnesota's 2nd congressional district, an independent stronghold. Overby, an information technology director and author of the 2017 book The Transgender Myth, and previous 2020 Legal Marijuana Now Party District 2 nominee, died On October 5, 2022, during recovery in a hospital following surgery for a heart valve condition. Overby's platform included marijuana legalization and universal Medicare. Without remedy for replacing their deceased nominee, under state law, LMN encouraged supporters to cast their votes for Overby, who remained on the ballot. The party was joined in support of voting in memoriam by Right Now USA, a conservative political action committee, while the Minnesota DFL Party paid for advertisements against Legal Marijuana Now, in District 2. The dead candidate, Overby, got 10,728 votes in Minnesota's 2nd district, in 2022.

==== 2023–2026 in Minnesota ====
In 2024, the state Supreme Court ruled that Minnesota Legal Marijuana Now! Party no longer qualified for major party ballot access under a 2023 law passed by the state Legislature, and Legal Marijuana Now candidates would need to petition during the two week filing window in May to get on the ballot. Edina author Anthony Walsh, who had launched an independent Legal Marijuana Now campaign for U.S. Representative a year earlier, was told he did not have the 1,000 required signatures by Minnesota Secretary of State Steve Simon, so Walsh instead ran a write-in campaign for Representative in Minnesota's 3rd congressional district. In 2026, Walsh ran for Hennepin County District 3 Commissioner. Walsh was eliminated in the August 11 primary with 4,121 votes, finishing third in the contest between six contenders for two spots on November general election ballots.

=== Nebraska ===
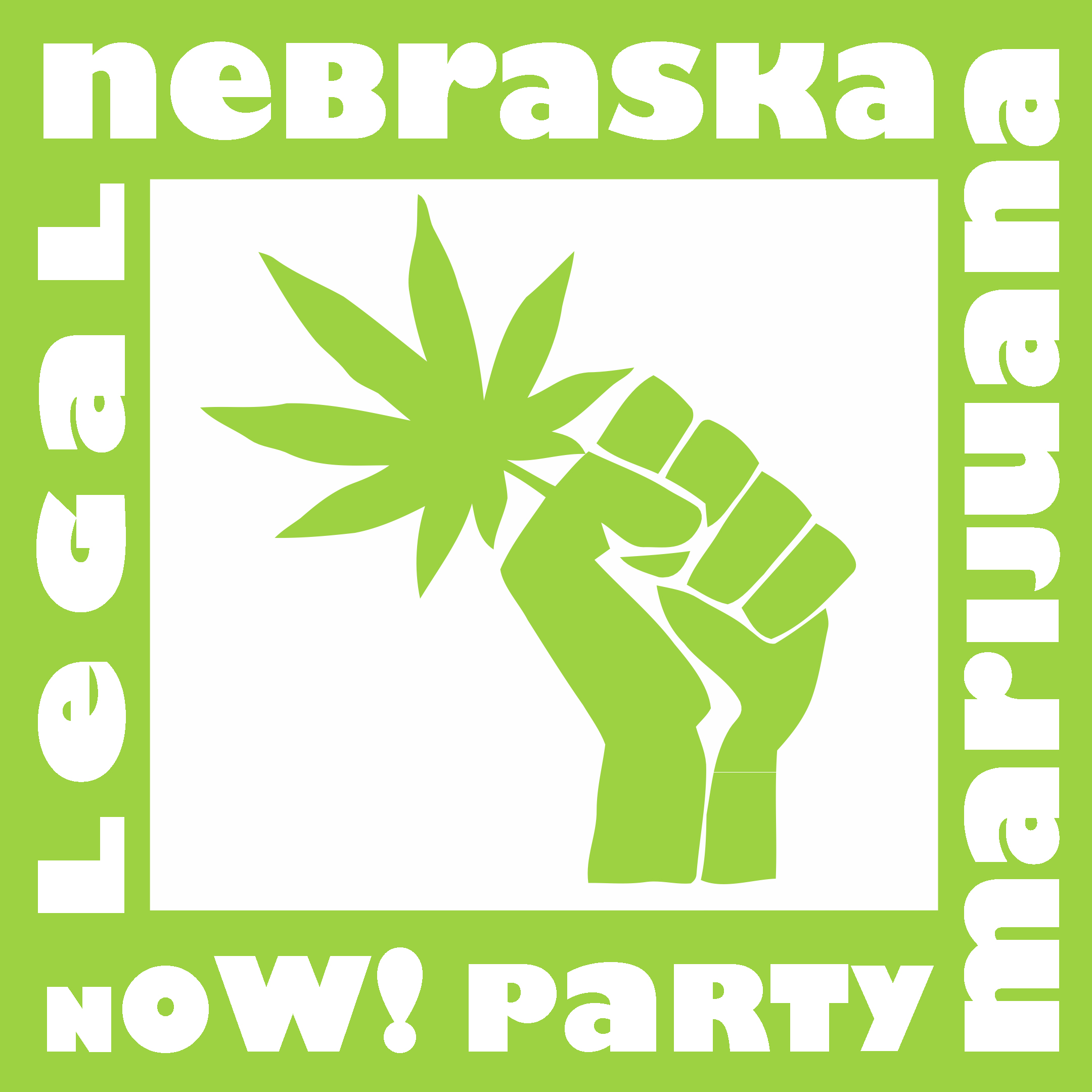
Nebraska Legal Marijuana NOW Party pin-back button design, circa 2023

==== 2015–2021 in Nebraska ====
Beginning in 2015, Mark Elworth, and Krystal Gabel collected signatures for a Marijuana Party of Nebraska to be officially recognized. The organization needed 5,397 signatures to make the ballot. In July, 2016, volunteers turned in more than 9,000 signatures to the Nebraska Secretary of State. However, the Secretary of State said that half of the signatures were invalid, falling short of the 5,397 needed.

In 2016, the group changed their name to Nebraska Legal Marijuana NOW Party, and organizers began petitioning a second time. The party needed to gather the signatures of 6,800 registered Nebraska voters in order to qualify as an official state party, and planned to collect 15,000 signatures just to be safe. Legal Marijuana NOW Party leaders submitted their petition in September, 2020. The Nebraska Secretary of State initially told petition drive organizers, on January 7, 2021, that the LMN petition was short by 28 signatures. On April 21, 2021, after the Secretary of State reviewed some petition signatures that were challenged, Legal Marijuana NOW gained official recognition as a state political party in Nebraska.

==== 2022–2026 in Nebraska ====
Larry Bolinger was nominated by Legal Marijuana NOW to run for Nebraska Attorney General in 2022. Bolinger, a resident of Alliance, focused on legalization of marijuana and expanding drug courts in the race to unseat Doug Peterson, who was seeking his third term as attorney general.

Leroy Lopez, a Wilber bowling alley owner, ran for Nebraska Auditor of Public Accounts, in 2022. Lopez got 120,986 votes, finishing second in the three-way race.

In 2022, Nebraska Legal Marijuana NOW ran more candidates for statewide constitutional offices than the Nebraska Democratic Party nominated. Their candidate for Attorney General, Bolinger, received 188,648 votes, more than 30 percent, the highest share for a statewide Nebraska candidate running outside the two major parties in 86 years, when independent George Norris was reelected to U.S. Senate. Bolinger was one of the top three independent and third party vote-getters in the US, in 2022.

Nebraska Legal Marijuana NOW Party held a U.S. Senate primary on May 14, 2024, between Kerry Eddy and Kenneth Peterson. The winner of the primary, Eddy, withdrew from the race in July and endorsed independent candidate Dan Osborn over anti-cannabis incumbent Republican senator Deb Fischer.

In 2025, Nebraska Legal Marijuana NOW Party surpassed 10,000 registered party voters, giving LMNP candidates Nebraskan ballot access indefinitely. Omaha chef and winery operator Rick Beard was nominated for Governor of Nebraska by LMNP voters in the May 12, 2026, primary. Beard's running mate, Omaha Housing Authority commissioner Keenya Barnes, serves as Omaha Performing Arts, Omaha by Design, and Table Grace Ministries community ambassador. The winner of the U.S. Senate primary, retired bus driver and labor union leader Mike Marvin, suspended his campaign in August, endorsing independent Osborn for U.S. Senator, though Marvin's name remains on November ballots.

=== New Hampshire ===
In 2022, the New Hampshire Cannabis Party attempted to get their candidates onto the ballot, by petitioning. Cannabis Party organizers Nathaniel Gurien and Kaitlyn McCarthy were unable to gather enough signatures to secure ballot access, in 2022.

=== New Jersey ===
In 1998, an independent candidate, Edward Forchion, ran for Congress from New Jersey as the Legalize Marijuana Party candidate. Since then, Forchion has run several times for a number of offices, under that banner. Forchion filed a lawsuit in an attempt to get onto the ballot in 2014 for New Jersey's 3rd congressional district, but a judge dismissed the lawsuit.

On August 25, 2005, while Forchion was campaigning for Governor, his home in Pemberton Township was vandalized during the night by someone who spray-painted a 6-foot cross together with the words “Get Jesus.” Burlington County police investigated the incident, calling it a hate crime because Forchion is a person of color. But Forchion told reporters that he thought he had been targeted because of his Rastafari religious beliefs, not because he is African American.

In 2014, Don Dezarn ran for US Representative from New Jersey's 12th congressional district as a Legalize Marijuana candidate.

Forchion petitioned in 2021 to run independently for governor as a “#Homegrow 4All” candidate, but the New Jersey Democratic Party challenged some of his signatures, and ultimately Forchion withdrew from the race.

=== New York ===
In 1967, the Youth International Party was formed in New York City by Abbie and Anita Hoffman, Paul Krassner, Nancy Kurshan, and Jerry Rubin.

The Marijuana Reform Party was established in New York state, in 1998, and ran Gubernatorial candidates there in both 1998 and 2002. In 1998, the New York Green Party attempted to challenge nominating petition signatures of Marijuana Reform Party candidate Tom Leighton and have his name removed from the ballot, claiming Marijuana Reform and Green parties both appeal to the same liberal voters, competing for automatic ballot access.

The Anti-prohibition Party ran candidates for office in New York for one election cycle in 2010.

=== Texas ===
Texas singer-songwriter Willie Nelson, who serves as co-chair of the National Organization for the Reform of Marijuana Laws advisory board, created Willie Nelson's TeaPot Party under the motto "Tax it, regulate it and legalize it!" after his arrest for marijuana possession in 2010. Nelson got 19 write-in votes for President of the United States in the 2024 Minnesota Legal Marijuana Now presidential primary held on March 5.

=== Vermont ===
The Vermont Grassroots Party was formed in 1994. Dennis Lane was Vermont Grassroots candidate for Governor of Vermont in 1994, and 1996.

Robert Melamede, a genetic researcher and microbiologist whose views promoting medical marijuana put him at odds with mainstream academia, was Grassroots nominee for U.S. Senator from Vermont, in 1994, and again in 1998. In 1996, Melamede was Grassroots candidate for U.S. Representative.

Three Grassroots candidates won five percent or more of the popular vote in the 1996 Vermont elections, qualifying Grassroots Party to be recognized as a major party, in Vermont, a status which they retained until 2002. GRP placed their presidential candidates, Dennis Peron, who opened the first San Francisco Cannabis Buyers Club in 1991, and running mate Arlin Troutt, onto ballots in two states, Vermont and Minnesota, in 1996.

Independent candidate Cris Ericson ran for Governor of Vermont in 2002 as a Make Marijuana Legal candidate. In 2004 through 2016, Ericson was on the ballot for multiple offices in Vermont under the label of U.S. Marijuana. In 2024, Ericson ran a marijuana party write-in campaign for United States Senator.

Galen Dively ran for Vermont Senate, in 2016, as a Marijuana Party candidate. Dively received 2,443 votes, 9.5 percent, in the race.

=== Washington state ===
Retired labor union official Rick Payne was on the Washington House of Representatives August, 2014, primary ballot as a Marijuana Party candidate. Payne received 1,644 votes (9.3 percent). Payne was defeated by a Republican candidate and a Libertarian candidate in the primary, and did not advance to the November general election.

== Notable American cannabis political parties ==
American cannabis political parties that are currently active or have been active in the past include:

- Anti-prohibition Party
- Grassroots–Legalize Cannabis Party
- Grassroots Party
- Independent Grassroots
- Legalize Marijuana Party
- Legal Marijuana Now (United States)
  - Minnesota Legal Marijuana Now! Party
  - Nebraska Legal Marijuana NOW Party
- Marijuana Reform Party
- U.S. Marijuana Party
- Willie Nelson's TeaPot Party
- Youth International Party

== See also ==
- Cannabis in the United States
- List of cannabis political parties
