= Cannabis political parties =

Political parties advocating cannabis legalization

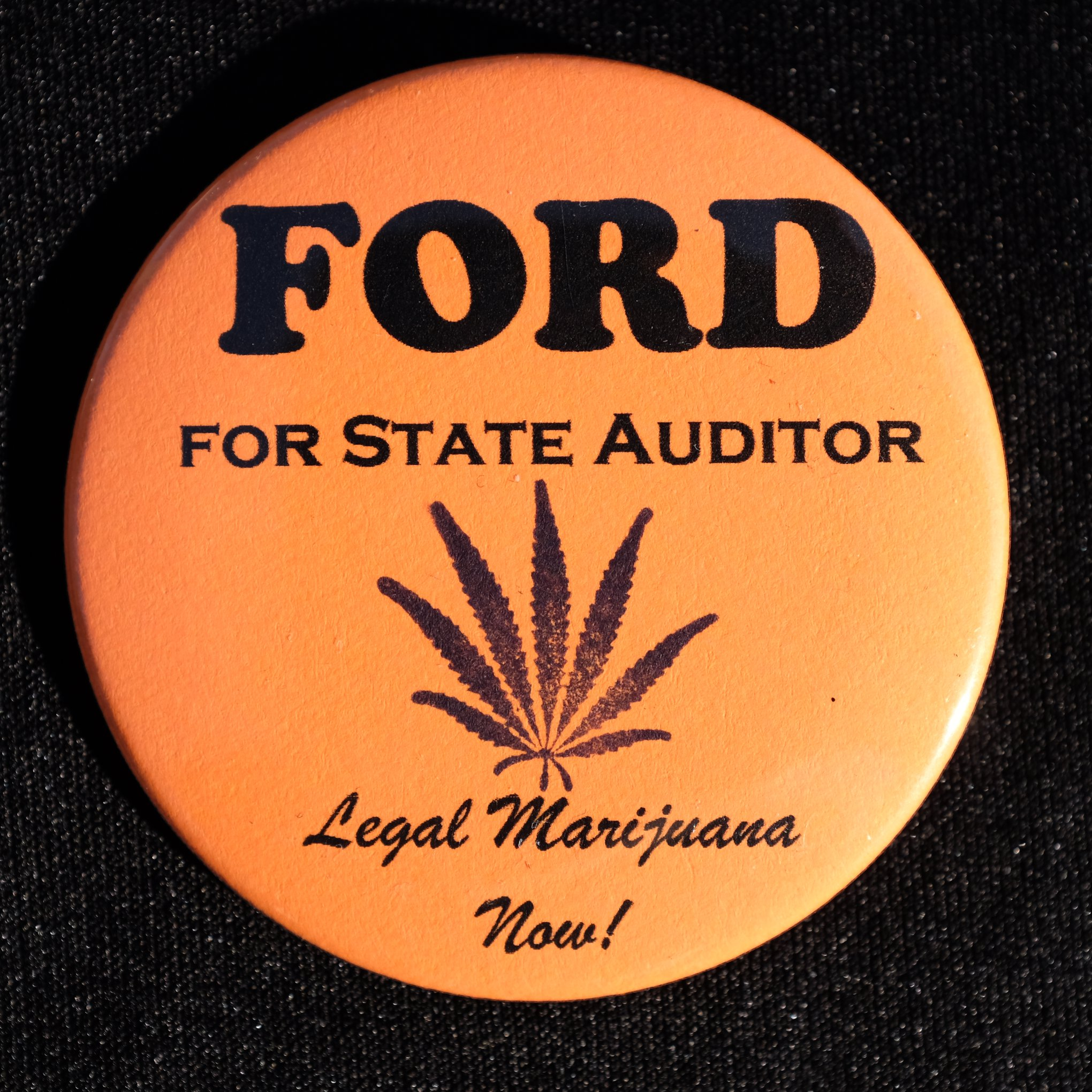
Minnesota Legal Marijuana Now! Party "Ford for State Auditor" 2018 election campaign pin-back button

Cannabis political parties are generally single-issue political organizations, operating in nations and principalities around the globe, that exist to oppose laws against cannabis consumers.

Cannabis party politicians are elected officeholders in New South Wales, Victoria, and Western Australia. Persistent state campaigns by marijuana party candidates have been influential driving progress of 2020s United States cannabis law reform.

== Australia ==
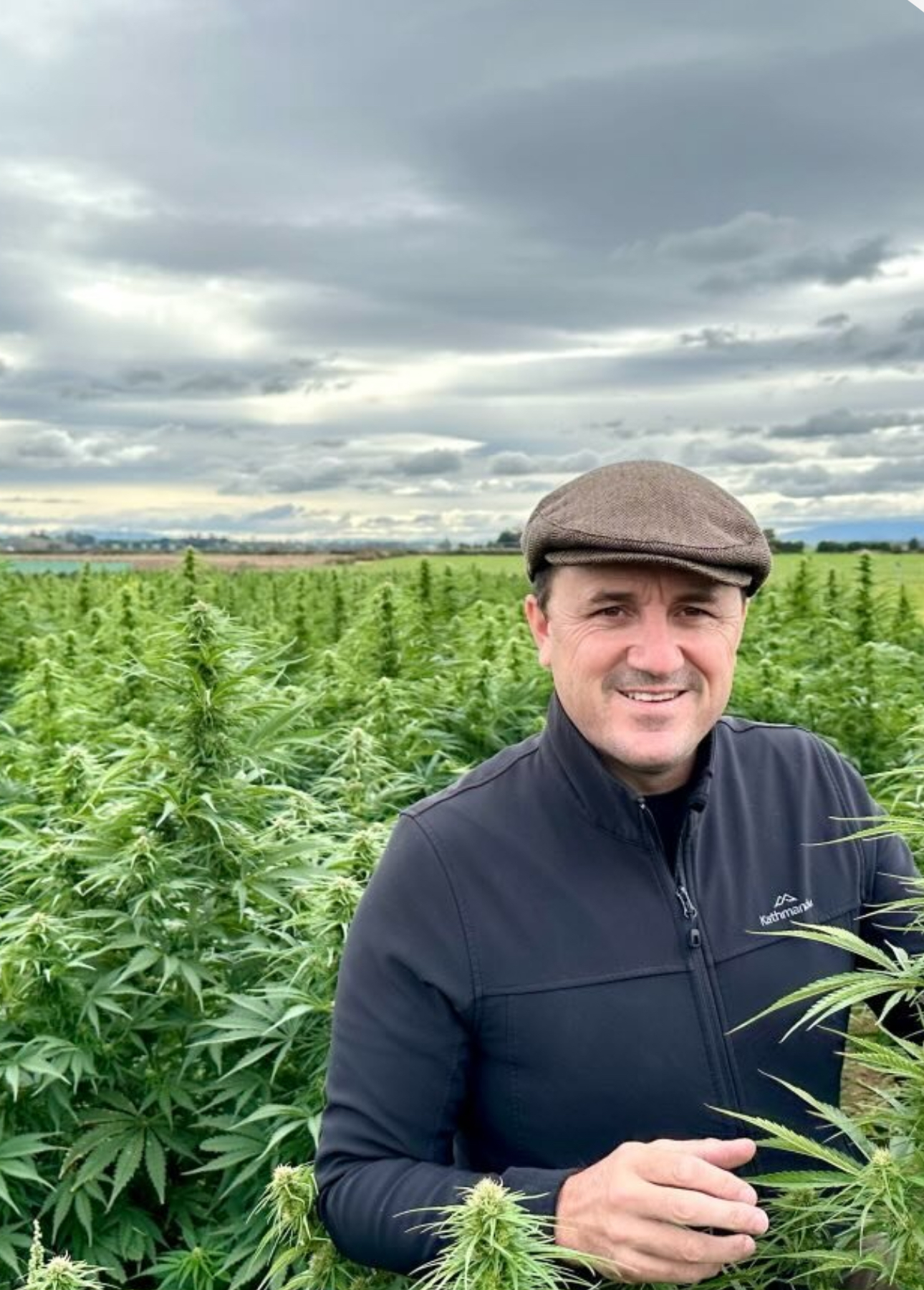
Legalise Cannabis Australia New South Wales Legislative Council member Jeremy Buckingham was elected in 2023

In the 1970s, J.J. McRoach ran for parliament as candidate for the Australian Marijuana Party. He had an advertising campaign funded by an anonymous dealer. His party came fourth in the elections. In 1986 Nick Brash ran for the "Marijuana Party" for the Kiama NSW by-election against ALP heavy-weight Bob "Bobo" Harrison. Then in 1987 Nick Brash ran in the Heathcote NSW by-election with 13 other candidates including the infamous Rex "Buckets" Jackson. This campaign was partly funded by the late John Marsden, solicitor and outspoken civil libertarian. In the 1988 NSW state election, he joined Macciza Macpherson in running for the Legislative Council. Soon after, the electoral laws were changed, requiring all political parties to prove a membership of 500 enrolled voters, an impossible task for the Marijuana Party.

Legalise Cannabis Australia continues to run in the upper house in South Australian state elections, with their best result being in 1997 when they received 1.7% of the vote, beating relatively popular parties such as the SA Greens and the SA branch of the National Party of Australia. Leader of the Australian Greens party Adam Bandt has also endorsed an open-minded attitude to recreational use of cannabis.

The Hemp Party was founded in 1993 and has a constitution, which describes an organisation with the aim of endorsing candidates to contest elections to the Federal Parliament of Australia. The HEMP Party (Help End Marijuana Prohibition) was first registered in 2000, and then de-registered in 2006 under Schedule 3 of the Electoral and Referendum Amendment (Electoral Integrity and Other Measures) Act 2006. During that time candidates stood in state and federal elections. Since that time it has been difficult to prove a membership of 500, as members contacted by the AEC (Australian Electoral Commission) sometimes disavowed membership, or had changed address without notifying the Party or the AEC.

Several applications later the AEC has assessed the party as meeting the test of being a political party under s4 of the Electoral Act. On 17 June 2010 the delegate determined that the party's application had passed its initial consideration for registration and the application was advertised for public objection on 23 June 2010. The issue of writs on 19 July 2010 for the federal elections meant that no further action could be taken on this application until the final return of all outstanding writs on 17 September 2010. No objections to the registration of the HEMP Party were received. The AEC assessed the party's application against the technical requirements in s126(2) of the Electoral Act. The application meets the technical requirements in s126(2). The delegate of the Australian Electoral Commission determined that the HEMP Party should therefore be registered under the Commonwealth Electoral Act 1918.

In 2013, the Drug Law Reform Party successfully registered with the Australian Electoral Commission, with over 500 members as required. Although the party represented the liberalisation of drug laws in general, cannabis was a primary focus. The party officially deregistered on 31 July 2017.

The Legalise Marijuana Party has applied for registration with the VEC in the lead-up to the 2022 Victorian state election. Legalise Cannabis Australia has questioned the party's legitimacy, noting that the party has no website or list of public policies.

=== Queensland ===
The Legalise Cannabis Queensland Party was established in the state of Queensland in September 2020.

=== Western Australia ===
The Legalise Cannabis Western Australia Party was founded in June 2020 in the state of Western Australia. It won two seats on the Western Australian Legislative Council in the March 2021 election.

== Canada ==
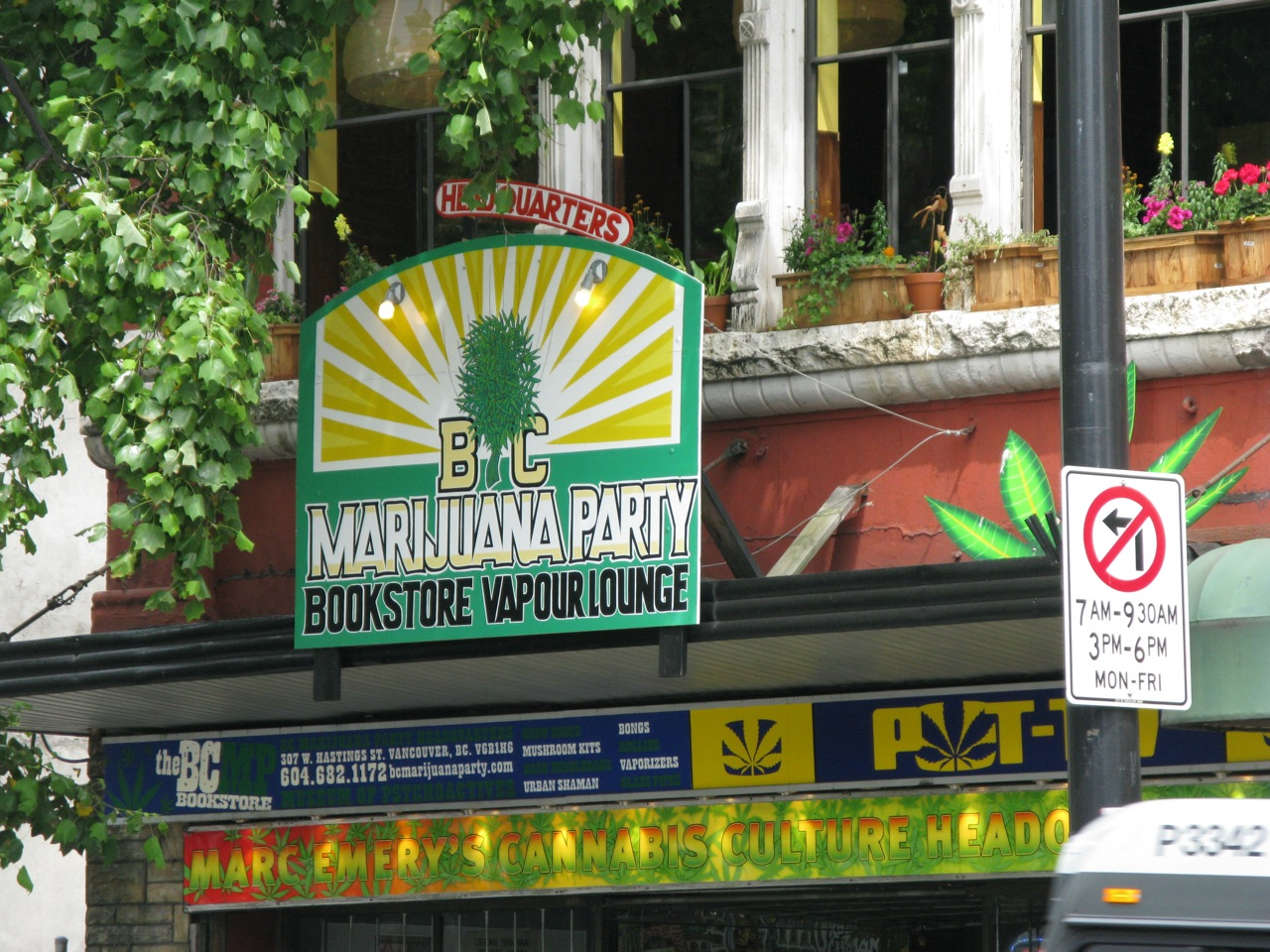
British Columbia Marijuana Party bookstore in Vancouver, 2009

In Canada, the Marijuana Party of Canada was launched by Marc-Boris St-Maurice in February 2000. Even after the legalisation of cannabis in Canada in 2018, the Marijuana Party is still politically active due to criticisms it has with some of Canada's cannabis laws and subsequently fights for legal reforms and the rights of cannabis users. The party is seen as a follow-up to the Québécois Bloc pot, in order to work at the federal level. There are also other party organizations at the provincial level. The Liberal Party of Canada were the main party responsible for Canada's legalization of cannabis.

=== British Columbia ===
In British Columbia, the British Columbia Marijuana Party works independently from the Marijuana Party of Canada.

=== Quebec ===
In Quebec, the Bloc pot, created by Marc-Boris St-Maurice, ran their first election campaign in 1998. In February 2000, St-Maurice launched the Marijuana Party of Canada, which ran 73 candidates in the 2000 federal election. Bloc pot is now the provincial counterpart of the Marijuana Party of Canada.

=== Saskatchewan ===
The Saskatchewan Marijuana Party functions in a politically independent fashion, and does not hold any formal association to any other political organizations federally or provincially. On April 20 of 2006, the party submitted their petition of registration to elections Saskatchewan. The petition was successful and the party was fully registered as a political party in the province of Saskatchewan as of 7 June 2006.

The party leader is currently Nathan Holowaty. Holowaty has referred to himself as a socially responsible libertarian and believes in the fullscale legalization of cannabis. Holowaty has a degree in political studies from the University of Saskatchewan.

== Denmark ==
Political parties in Folketinget, which is the Danish parliament, who wants to legalize cannabis:

Liberal Alliance are in favor of cannabis legalization. This is the case for both medical and recreational. "I want a state regulated sale of cannabis, like the state regulates alcohol and cigarettes. That way, we have a better control of which drugs are on the market, and that they aren't sold to kids." - Christina Egelund.

Alternativet are in favor of cannabis legalization. This is the case for both medical and recreational. "This is a great way to take a stand against criminal gangs, decriminalize normal Danes and to secure that there aren't any dangerous chemicals added." - Josephine Fock.

Socialist People's Party are in factor of a regulated legalization of cannabis. "Today, some people smoke way too much cannabis and get problems, but we doesn't help them by punishing them, when they in reality need help. We should treat cannabis like alcohol, and focus on the ones, who get addicted." - Lisbeth Bech Poulsen.

After the incident at Freetown Christiania, where the police destroyed all the stalls, and cleared them of cannabis, the Danish Social Liberal Party have chanced stance on this issue. They now want a three-year trial, where you can buy state regulated cannabis across the country.

Red–Green Alliance wants to legalize cannabis sold and produced by the state. "It will secure that criminals can't make money off the import, nor make money off the illegal sale of cannabis. The money, the state makes off the sale, shall be used on information, treatment for the addicts and welfare benefits, instead of giving the money to the criminals" - Rune Lund.

The Hampepartiet (Cannabis Party, Denmark) was formed in 2001.

== Finland ==
Finland's Hamppupuolue (Hemp party) was founded in 2022, and was added to state's register of political parties on 28th May 2025.

== France ==
In France, the party Cannabis Sans Frontière (Cannabis without borders) led by Farid Ghehiouèche has run in several elections.

== Greece ==
As of 2015, there have been ongoing attempts for the establishment of the Cannabis Party of Greece, but they haven't resulted in the creation of a registered political party yet.

== Ireland ==
In Ireland, there were attempts to establish a Cannabis legalisation Party however the government have so far refused to allow any such parties to be registered. A number of individuals including journalist Olaf Tyaransen and Phoenix Park festival organiser Ubi Dwyer have stood in various elections (national, Local and European) as independent candidates on a legalise cannabis platform. The only success to date has been the election of Luke 'Ming' Flanagan to The Dáil in the 2011 general election although it is generally accepted that Flannigan's success was also mainly due to his stance on other political issues.

The Irish political party, People Before Profit, support the legalisation of cannabis for medical and general use. The party has stated that it would, "legislate for the use of medicinal cannabis for pain management of chronic conditions" and medical cannabis be "researched and made available as an evidence-based option for health care providers and patients". As well as stating that it wants the "non-commercialised legalisation of cannabis to be regulated by a new state body and dispensed via designated stores".

== Israel ==
Flag of Ale Yarok, circa 1999

In Israel, the Ale Yarok (Green Leaf) party participated in the past six elections and came close to winning a Knesset seat.

== Kenya ==
In Kenya the Roots party by Prof. George Wajakoya enacted a bill to legalize marijuana for export, medicinal and recreational purpose.

== New Zealand ==
In New Zealand, the Aotearoa Legalise Cannabis Party ran for the first time in 1996. They have never had any Members of Parliament, but have averaged around 1% of the popular vote - one fifth of what is necessary to gain MPs under New Zealand's proportional representation system. A former member, Nándor Tánczos, was an MP as part of the New Zealand Green Party (1999–2008). (He was also New Zealand's first ever Rastafarian Member of Parliament). The party had candidates in the 2008 general election.

The Green Party of Aotearoa New Zealand said that if it formed a government in the 2017 election it would legalise cannabis. "Under its proposal, people would be able to legally grow and possess marijuana for personal use". The party said it would also "urgently amend the law so sick people using medicinal marijuana were not penalised". The party negotiated its involvement in the Sixth Labour Government of New Zealand, which included securing a referendum on the legalisation of cannabis in New Zealand. The legalisation of cannabis in New Zealand was narrowly rejected in the 2020 New Zealand cannabis referendum.

The former leader of the ACT Party Don Brash has spoken out in favour of decriminalizing cannabis.

== Norway ==
On 22 September 2009, the political party DnC or Det norske Cannabispartiet was registered in Stavanger by Even Ganja Helland and Sigbjørn Eskeland, both from Jørpeland, Norway.

== Philippines ==
In the Philippines, the Medical Cannabis Party, also known as (MedCann), is the first medical cannabis party in Asia. Launched on April 20, the party has established chapters in major cities across the Philippines.The party supports industrial hemp, cannabis in medicinal practices, and the eradication of criminal records of those with possession charges.

== South Africa ==
The nationally registered political party Iqela Lentsango: The Dagga Party of South Africa is South Africa's first and foremost Cannabis legalization group. This group are also activists and supporters of people arrested, charged and/or imprisoned for the possession of dagga (the South Africa word for Cannabis) and related charges.

Dr. Mario Oriani-Ambrosini, a Member of Parliament in South Africa, he was diagnosed with cancer and subsequently began lobbying for the legalization of medical marijuana. He went so far as to address the entire Parliament sitting in Cape Town with an impassioned plea for the Members of Parliament to consider the legalization of medical marijuana. He died shortly after this but thanks to him and other activists, South Africa seems to be heading in the direction of eventually legalizing cannabis for medical use.

== Spain ==
In Spain, the Partido Cannabis participated in the 2004 Spanish general election, by standing candidates for seats in the Cortes in three provinces, (Valencia, Alicante and Valladolid). They scored between 0.35% and 1.11% of votes cast. It was dissolved in 2007.

Between 2007 and 2021, the party RCN-NOK was active only in the Navarra region. After 2021, Luz Verde, a new nationwide cannabis political party, was created.

== United Kingdom ==
In the United Kingdom, the Legalise Cannabis Alliance (LCA), registered as a political party from 1999 to 2006, with Alun Buffry as its leader-for-the-purpose-of-registration-only, fielding candidates in elections to the House of Commons of the Parliament of the United Kingdom and to local government councils. The LCA de-registered itself as a political party, and continues to work as a pressure group.

The party drew inspiration from the performances of Howard Marks and Buster Nolan as independent legalise cannabis candidates in the 1997 general election. (Howard Marks stood in four different constituencies of the House of Commons.) The LCC, Legalise Cannabis Campaign, founded in the late 60s acted as a pressure group throughout the 1970s and 80s and provided a seedbed of support for these later political manifestations.

By the time of the 2001 general election the party had experience of campaigns in two House of Commons by-elections and various local government elections. In the general election the party contested 13 constituencies and their share of the vote ranged from 1.1% to 2.5%.

In January 2004, cannabis prohibition in the UK was relaxed. Cannabis had been a class B substance under the Misuse of Drugs Act 1971. It became a class C substance, and many people saw this change as virtual 'decriminalisation'. It was a long way short of full legalisation. It has recently returned to a class B substance.

The LCA contested 21 constituencies in the 2005 general election. Their share of the vote ranged from 0.6% to 1.8%, falling significantly from its previous levels, presumably because reclassification of cannabis had made the case for legalisation less pressing.

The de-registered, Legalise Cannabis Alliance, adopted a new identity as CLEAR - Cannabis Law Reform, in 2011. Upon this identity change there was also a change of policy, spokespersons, logo, emblems, fliers and aims. CLEAR was a registered political party from 2011 to 2013. The organisation now works as a lobby group.

Cannabis Is Safer Than Alcohol (CISTA) was a political party founded in 2015. In the 2015 General Election they campaigned for a Royal Commission to review the UK's drug laws relating to cannabis. CISTA is for harm reduction. The party was deregistered by the Electoral Commission on 3 November 2016.

Since 2016, the Liberal Democrats, Green Party of England and Wales and Scottish Green Party all support the legalisation of cannabis.

== United States ==
Circa 1970s Youth International Party flag

Active cannabis political parties in the United States include the Legal Marijuana Now Party, and the U.S. Marijuana Party.

Both the Libertarian Party and the Green Party advocate for the legalization of marijuana.

Other cannabis political parties that were active in the past have included the Anti-prohibition Party, the Grassroots Party, the Marijuana Reform Party, and the Youth International Party.

Legal Marijuana Now! Party is credited with motivating the Democratic Party to prioritize cannabis legalization in Minnesota, in 2023.

=== U.S. cannabis political party history (1960s–1970s) ===
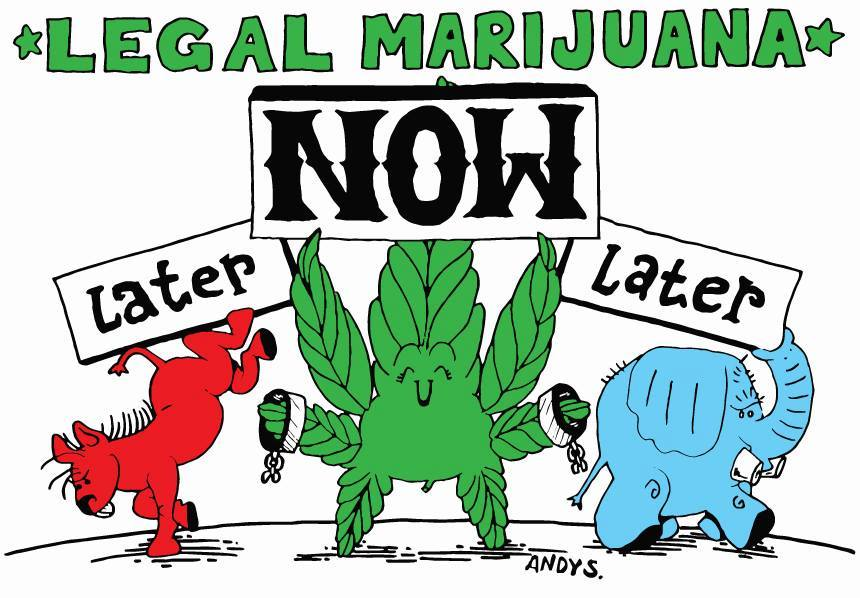
Legal Marijuana Now Party mascot, "Busting the Shackles of Two Party Oppression," 2016

The Youth International Party, formed in 1967 to advance the counterculture of the 1960s, often ran campaigns for public offices. The Yippie flag is a five-pointed star superimposed with a cannabis leaf.

=== 1980s–1990s ===
- The Grassroots Party was founded in Minnesota in 1986 and ran numerous candidates for state and federal offices. The party was active in Iowa, Minnesota, and Vermont. Grassroots Party ran candidates in every presidential election from 1988 to 2000.
- The Legal Marijuana Now Party was established in Minnesota in 1998.
- In 1998, an independent candidate, Edward Forchion, ran for Congress from New Jersey as the Legalize Marijuana Party candidate. Since then, Forchion has run several times for a number of offices, under that banner.
- The Marijuana Reform Party was established in New York, in 1998, and ran Gubernatorial candidates there in both 1998 and 2002.

=== 2000s–2010s ===
- The U.S. Marijuana Party, organized in 2002, promotes electoral involvement by marijuana legalization supporters. In 2012, the group endorsed Libertarian Gary Johnson for President.
- The Anti-prohibition Party ran candidates for office in New York State for one election cycle in 2010.
- In 2010 and 2012, independent candidate Cris Ericson was on the ballot for multiple offices in Vermont under the label of U.S. Marijuana.
- The Grassroots–Legalize Cannabis Party was formed in Minnesota in 2014.
- In 2016, the Legal Marijuana Now Party placed their presidential candidates onto the ballot in two states.
- The Minnesota Legal Marijuana Now! nominee for State Auditor in 2018, Michael Ford, who is African-American, got 133,913 votes or 5.28 percent, qualifying Legal Marijuana Now! Party to have major party ballot access in Minnesota through 2022.

=== 2020–2024 ===
- In 2020, the Minnesota Legal Marijuana Now! candidate for United States Senator received 190,154 votes, more than any other such third-party candidate in the nation, extending ballot access for party candidates in Minnesota until 2024.
- 2022 Minnesota State Auditor nominee Tim Davis, who was Legal Marijuana Now! Party's chair at the time, qualified for a $28,000 Minnesota elections public subsidy intended to help regular Minnesotans run for office, by meeting a $6000 fundraising requirement before the July deadline and openly reporting all his campaign income and expenditures. Davis used the public money to print and distribute pro-cannabis legalization campaign fliers door to door, across the state.
- In 2022, Nebraska Legal Marijuana NOW ran more candidates for statewide constitutional offices than the Nebraska Democratic Party nominated. Their candidate for Attorney General, Larry Bolinger, received 188,648 votes, more than 30 percent, the highest share for a statewide Nebraska candidate running outside the two major parties in 86 years, when independent George Norris was reelected to U.S. Senate. Bolinger was one of the top two third party vote-getters in the US, in 2022.
- The Legal Marijuana Now! Party is credited with motivating the Minnesota Democratic–Farmer–Labor Party to prioritize the passage of a cannabis legalization law in the state, in 2023.

=== Since 2025 ===
- Nebraska Legal Marijuana NOW Party exceeded 10,000 members registered with the party in 2025, giving Legal Marijuana NOW candidates Nebraskan ballot access indefinitely.
- In 2026, Omaha chef and winery operator Rick Beard was nominated for Governor of Nebraska by LMNP primary voters. Beard's running mate is Omaha Housing Authority commissioner Keenya Barnes, who serves as Omaha Performing Arts, Omaha by Design, and Table Grace Ministries community ambassador.

=== Iowa ===
In Iowa: the Grassroots Party, and the Legal Marijuana Now Party.

=== Minnesota ===
In Minnesota: the Legal Marijuana Now! Party.

=== Nebraska ===
In Nebraska: the Legal Marijuana NOW Party.

=== New Jersey ===
In New Jersey: the Legalize Marijuana Party.

=== Vermont ===
In Vermont: the Grassroots Party, and the U.S. Marijuana Party.

== See also ==
- Cannabis rights
- Drug liberalization
- Legality of cannabis
- List of cannabis rights organizations
