= Krystal Gabel =

American cannabis activist

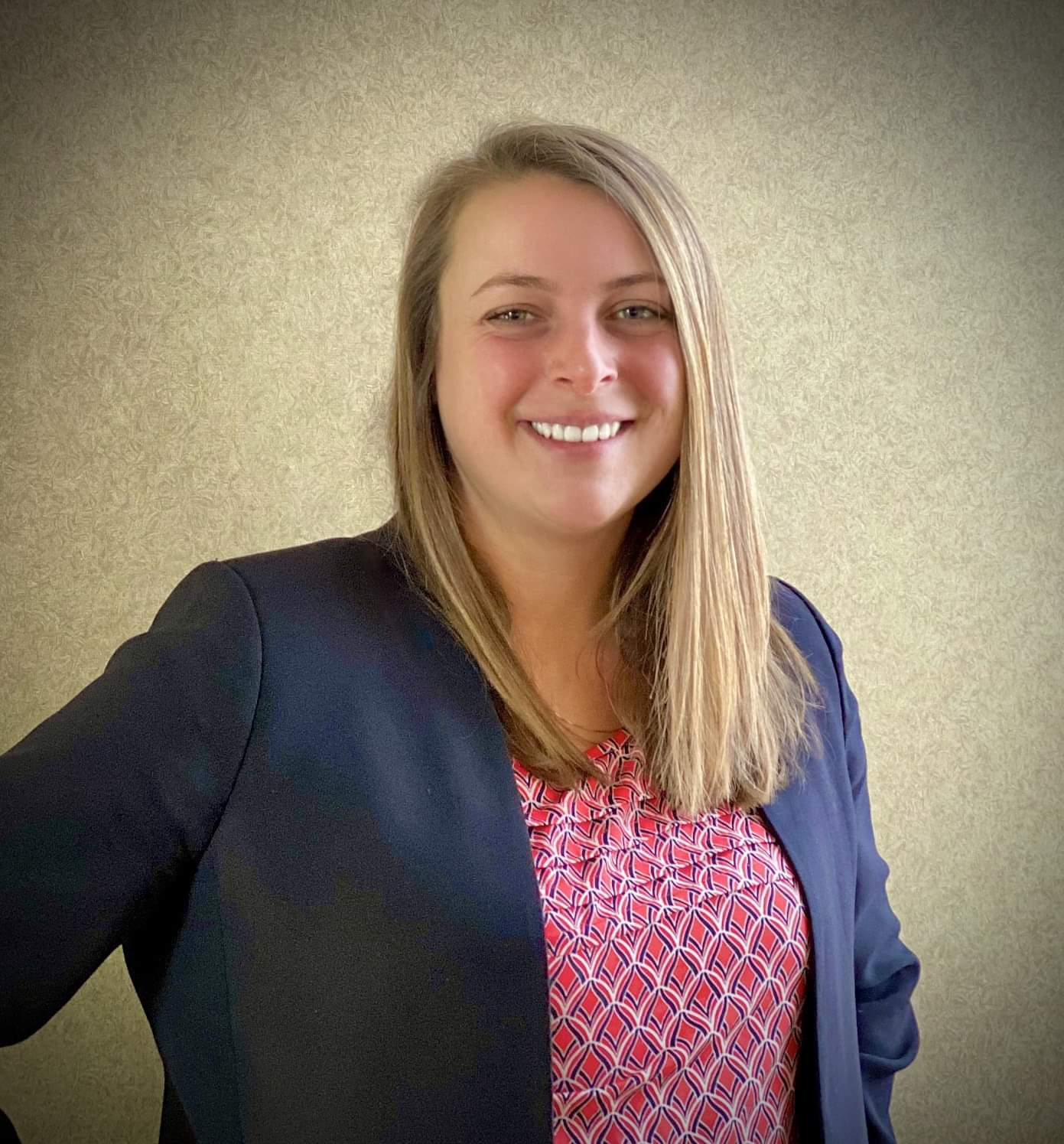
- Born: October 14, 1984 (age 42); Akron, Iowa
- Education: Briar Cliff University
- Occupation: Writer
- Known for: Cannabis rights activism
- Political party: Independent (2021—present)
- Other political affiliations: Legal Marijuana Now (2015—2024); Republican (2018, 2020)

Krystal Gabel (born October 14, 1984) is an American cannabis rights activist, perennial candidate, and writer. Gabel, a candidate for governor of Nebraska in the 2018 election, at age 33 was the youngest of a record number of women who ran for governorships, nationally. In 2020, Gabel ran for Nebraska Public Service Commission in the Republican primary.

Gabel led a successful petition drive to acquire ballot access for a Nebraska Legal Marijuana NOW Party branch. A resident of Brush, Colorado, Gabel was a candidate for mayor of Brush, in 2021, and for Brush City Council, in 2023.

== Early activism ==
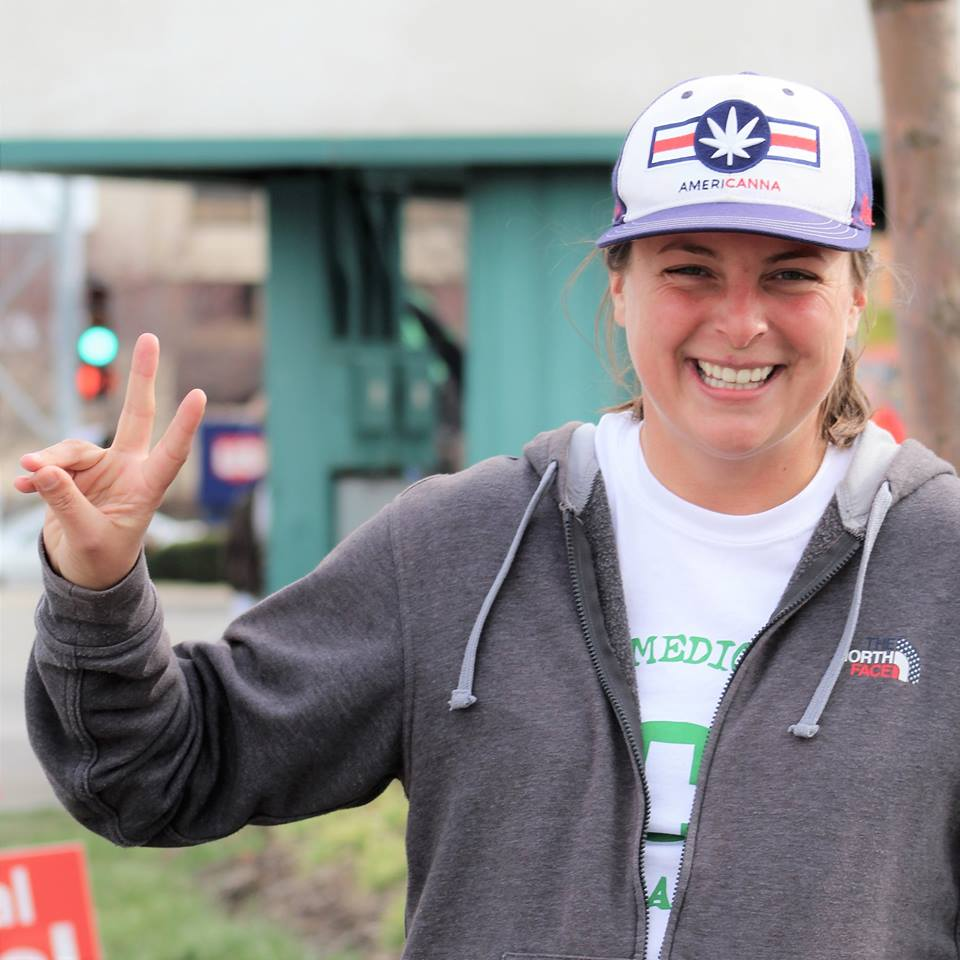
Krystal Gabel at a demonstration in Omaha on April 20, 2018

=== Nebraska Legal Marijuana NOW ===
In 2015–2016, Gabel petitioned for a Marijuana Party of Nebraska to be officially recognized by the state. In order to make the ballot, they needed 5,397 signatures statewide. In July 2016, the party turned in 9,000 signatures to the Nebraska Secretary of State. However, the Secretary of State said that half of the signatures were invalid, falling short of the 5,397 needed.

In 2016, Gabel and Mark Elworth changed the name of the Nebraska party to Legal Marijuana NOW, and in September 2016, began circulating petitions for 2020 ballot access. They said the organization planned to collect double the number of signatures they submitted in 2016, to ensure their success.

=== Independent candidate ===
Gabel ran unsuccessfully as an independent candidate for Omaha Public School Board, in 2016, and for mayor of Lincoln, Nebraska, in 2019.

In 2016, Gabel placed third out of four candidates in the race for two seats on the Omaha Metropolitan Utilities District, 1.2 percent short of winning. And in 2017, placed third in the primary for Omaha City Council, 143 votes away from making it to the general election.

=== Republican gubernatorial candidate ===
In 2018, Gabel ran for governor of Nebraska as a Republican. She ran on a fiscally conservative platform that included the legalization of marijuana. Gabel's campaign to unseat Governor Pete Ricketts drew attention from outside Nebraska because United States Republican Party candidates, in 2018, rarely supported drug law reform. Gabel said she chose to run in the primary as a Republican because the signature requirement for running in the general election as an independent candidate was infeasible for people of working-class means, such as herself.

A record number of women ran for high-profile offices in the US, in 2018, including six women under age 40 who vied for Democratic or Republican Party nominations for governor. Gabel, at age 33, was the youngest of these candidates. Had she been elected, Gabel would have become the youngest women elected to governor in American history, breaking the record, in 2011 by Nikki Haley, of 38 years old. Running against an incumbent in the Nebraska Republican primary was a long shot, and Gabel lost on May 15, receiving 19 percent, 31,300 votes.

== 2020s career ==
=== Nebraska Republican Party ===
Gabel ran for Nebraska Public Service Commission, in 2020, and was defeated in the Republican primary. She received 7,165 votes, 45 percent.

=== Colorado MAGA Patriot Party ===
Early in 2021, Gabel filed paperwork to establish a MAGA Patriot Party, headquartered in Brush, Colorado. Gabel said third parties elevate regular people by providing a mechanism that ordinary Americans need to either be a candidate, or to be a volunteer. And competition by third parties stimulates the democratic process.

=== Legal Marijuana Now Party ===
On April 21, 2021, Legal Marijuana NOW gained official recognition as a state political party in Nebraska, earning the party ballot access for their candidates, and allowing Legal Marijuana NOW Party to register voters. Minnesota Legal Marijuana Now Party had previously qualified to be an official major party in the state of Minnesota in the November 6, 2018, election, when their candidate for State Auditor received more than 5 percent. Gabel, who had been national chairperson of the Legal Marijuana Now Party from 2021 to 2023, was a 2024 Legal Marijuana Now Party nominee for US President, but withdrew before the primary. Despite having withdrawn, Gabel got the most votes on March 5.

=== Colorado independent candidate ===
Gabel ran unsuccessfully for Mayor of Brush, Colorado in 2021, and for Ward 3 Brush City Council, in 2023.

While campaigning in September, 2023, Gabel was involved in a confrontation with another resident. Brush Police Department Cadet Raymond Wells, who was called to the scene, defused the situation, and ultimately no criminal charges were filed in the incident. Gabel and the neighbor mutually agreed to avoid each other, going forward.

== Political views ==
=== Civil rights ===
Gabel supports legalized marijuana for medical and non-medical use. In 2017, while campaigning for governor, Gabel said, “I believe … current Governor Pete Ricketts is wrongly criminalizing cannabis and ruining the entire lives of many Nebraskans. … I want to be elected so that our state's politics and laws serve Nebraskans and protect their rights, not criminalize or prevent them from living a good life.” Gabel supports prison reform, and would pardon people with past convictions for nonviolent cannabis offenses. She supports laws protecting LGBTQ rights.

=== Economy ===
During 2017 and 2018 election campaigns, Gabel opposed raising taxes for working families and individuals. She argued revenue from industrial hemp production and new industries created serving cannabis consumers would spur the economy.

=== Education ===
Gabel opposes school choice, saying it harms public education. Gabel supports broad K–12 and higher education funding, calling it a wise investment. In 2018, she said, “If the state doesn't readjust its budget to fully fund our public schools, our school districts will fail, students and taxpayers will pay more for education, and our college towns will turn into ghost towns. I strongly believe Nebraska's tax dollars should go directly into front-end investments that give Nebraskans better opportunities.” Gabel argued that reducing state funding for education would lead to increased local taxes.

=== Environment ===
A proponent of zero waste communities and green sustainable energy, Gabel would let farmers grow hemp to produce biodiesel fuel. Her opponent in the 2018 election, Governor Ricketts, opposed allowing hemp farming in the state, and instead supported Nebraska's current, university-based hemp research. Gabel favors rewriting zoning laws that discourage tiny homes, supports use of electric vehicles, proposes a system of heated streets using power plant waste water, believes free city bus services would stimulate job creation.

=== Healthcare ===
Gabel supports affordable healthcare, improved domestic violence services, health insurance reform. In 2018, she said proposals to reduce public funding for Planned Parenthood would hurt working individuals and families, and poor people.

In 2018, Gabel said Nebraska's ban on medical cannabis was leading to patients traveling out of state to purchase “natural” medicine. Earlier, in 2017, Gabel had accused Ricketts of denying patients an option for their health care. Gabel said marijuana was not dangerous as opioids, and other drugs, prescribed by doctors.

=== Public safety ===
A vocal defender of American First and Second Amendment rights, Gabel said if elected she would revisit laws that fine, penalize, incarcerate, criminalize people who possess marijuana, and said she believes it is a priority to serve, protect and respect all people's rights. Gabel said she would improve funding for drug addiction rehabilitation programs. Gabel said she values trust created by recognizing common values shared by everyone, and the act of ending prohibition would help reestablish public trust.

=== Social justice ===
In the 2018 Nebraska governor race, Gabel said government is meant to be run by the people, not the elite. She said, “The office of governor was designed to seat a common Nebraskan.” Gabel ran her campaign on a budget less than $5,000. Ricketts reported raising $600,000 to run his campaign, and $1.7 million cash fund. Gabel's platform included building a Beginning Farmers program for individuals, families, small businesses, ranchers, farmers.

== Personal life ==
Gabel, who graduated from Akron–Westfield Senior High School at age 17, and holds a degree in writing from Briar Cliff University in Sioux City, Iowa, operated a free community garden in South Omaha, Nebraska.

Gabel grew up in Akron, Iowa, lived in Nebraska during the 2010s, and moved to Colorado in 2020.

== Political candidacy ==
Gabel has run several times for various offices, including:

- Omaha Public School Board, Subdistrict 1, and Metropolitan Utilities District, in 2016
- Omaha City Council, District 2, in 2017
- Governor of Nebraska in 2018
- Mayor of Lincoln, Nebraska, in 2019
- Nebraska Public Service Commission, District 2, in 2020
- Mayor of Brush, Colorado, in 2021
- Brush City Council, Ward 3, in 2023
