= Finnish Cannabis Association =

Organisation based in Finland

Finnish Cannabis Association (FCA)
- Formation: 1990
- Purpose: Legalisation or decriminalisation of cannabis.
- Website: www.suomenkannabisyhdistys.com

The Finnish Cannabis Association (FCA; Finnish: Suomen kannabisyhdistys; Swedish: Finlands Cannabisförening, commonly referred to by the acronym SKY) is a Finnish non-governmental organisation whose purpose is to advocate legalisation or decriminalisation of cannabis.

The FCA started operating in 1990 and was officially established in 1991. According its mission statement, the purpose of the association is to influence the Finnish legislation so that adults could legally use, obtain and cultivate cannabis for personal use. The FCA also studies the use of cannabis in different cultures during different times.

The association had 36 members in 1991, and about 650 in 2000.

== History ==
=== Background ===
Over the years the FCA has faced many hardships in Finland, where a lot of the population do not make practically any distinction between different illegal drugs (huumeet), such as cannabis and heroin. Reasons for this include the fact that the use of cannabis has generally been much less common in Finland than in other EU countries, and that the tradition of "drug education", based mainly in intimidation and modeled after practices from the United States and Sweden, is still quite strong in schools and the media. According to the traditional Finnish mindset, it is preferable to lose control with alcohol or to even use it excessively over long periods of time, than to experiment with cannabis, which is seen both as very dangerous in itself and as a "gateway drug".

=== Legal status ===
The Finnish Cannabis Association first applied for the status of a registered association (rekisteröity yhdistys, ry) in 1991, but the association register office maintained by the Finnish Ministry of Justice, and later the Supreme Administrative Court have rejected the application. The ministry based their rejection, in 1993, on the grounds that the purpose of FCA is "against good customs so that the expressed purpose is contrary to the views about justice and morality prevailing in our society". As of 2005, the FCA still has not obtained the status of a registered association.

In 1991 two members of the Finnish parliament representing the Finnish Agrarian Party (now True Finns) made an inquiry on the legality of the operation of FCA, with the aim of putting an end to the cannabis organisation. The Ministry of the Interior, which carried out the inspection, responded that "the association has not operated fundamentally against the law or good customs".

=== Activities ===
The FCA has attained some credibility, by e.g. taking part in public drug policy discussions and debates, and occasionally co-operating governmental health sector organisations as well as with other harm reduction groups. However, a long-standing problem for the association has been that it is not always taken seriously, and instead is dismissed by many as a "bunch of drugged-out hippies".

In recent years perhaps the most visible FCA activity has been the annual cannabis march (Hamppumarssi, part of the global Million Marijuana March demonstrations) in Helsinki. (Similar marches in other Finnish cities have been organised by other loose pro-cannabis groups, perhaps reflecting a Helsinki-centric nature of the FCA.) However, among the rising, largely internet-based, cannabis "subculture" in Finland, the FCA has sometimes been criticised for stagnating and lack of activity.

On 22 April 2024, a citizens' initiative to legalise cannabis in Finland with 54,000 signatures was delivered to the Parliament of Finland by the deputy chairman of the FCA, Coel Thomas.

== See also ==
- Cannabis in Finland
