= Cannabis in Finland =

Legality of cannabis in Europe Legal for recreational use Legal for medical use Illegal

Cannabis in Finland is illegal. The 50th chapter of the Criminal Code criminalises all dealings with illegal narcotics, including the production, import, transport, sale, possession and use of cannabis.

== History ==
=== 1966–1972: The beginning of prohibition ===
The prohibition of cannabis in Finland dates back to 1966. The criminalisation of personal use has been controversial. After a tie vote, the Grand Committee's stance on the issue was decided by a random ballot. In parliament, the personal use of cannabis was voted to be made illegal in 1971 by a vote of 92 for, 80 against. This outcome was at odds with the government's stance. The personal use of cannabis was made illegal in 1972.

=== 2019: Push towards law reform ===
In late 2019, a citizens' initiative seeking to decriminalize the personal use of cannabis in Finland received the needed 50,000 signatures, and will therefore be processed by the parliament in the 2019–2023 session.

The collection of signatures ended on 1 November 2019, with a total of 59,609 votes.

In 2021, at the initiative of Coel Thomas, the vice-chair of the Helsinki Greens, and 100 other party members, the Green League became the first parliamentary political party in Finland to include the legalisation and regulation of cannabis in its party program.

== Personal use ==
The criminal procedure regarding personal use of illegal narcotics was reformed in 2001. The goal of the change was to relieve burden of personal use cases from the courts, expedite enforcement and standardise enforcement policies – specifically by stopping cases from not being prosecuted due to lack of resources. In the reformed procedure the police issue summary fines for most personal use offences, and cases are not brought to court unless the defendant so desires. Aggravated drug offences and possession with intent to redistribute (possession for sale) are always brought to court and penalties are harsher. In practice, possession of up to 10 grams of hashish or 15 grams of marijuana is deemed personal use and carries a penalty of 10–20 day-fines. A review of case law by a Finnish law firm reports mostly on cases of cannabis cultivation.

Enforcement of the prohibition by police is subject to the Coercive Measures Act (law 806/2011). The Turku Court of Appeal in 2015 ruled that a night-time search of a home by police violated the principle of proportionality (nr. 1411073).

== Medical cannabis ==
An extremely limited group of medicinal users (223 in 2014) are permitted to purchase Sativex mouth spray and/or Bedrocan, Bediol or Bedica brand herbal cannabis from one of 27 apothecaries that have the permit to sell medical cannabis.

== See also ==
- Finnish Cannabis Association
- Hemp Party
