= Logan Fontenelle Housing Project =

Public housing project in Omaha NE

Coordinates: 41°16′23″N 95°56′43″W

The Logan Fontenelle Housing Project was a historic public housing site located from 20th to 24th Streets, and from Paul to Seward Streets in the historic Near North Side neighborhood of Omaha, Nebraska, United States. It was built in 1938 by the Public Works Administration for housing working-class families. With the loss of thousands of industrial jobs in the 1950s and 1960s, the project became filled with families on welfare. As problems increased in the 1970s and 1980s, Logan Fontenelle was referred to as "Little Vietnam" because of drug dealing and gang violence. After Logan Fontenelle residents won a 1991 civil rights lawsuit brought against the Omaha Housing Authority and the U.S. Department of Housing and Urban Development, HUD tore down the projects in 1995 to replace them with new, lower density housing.

== History ==
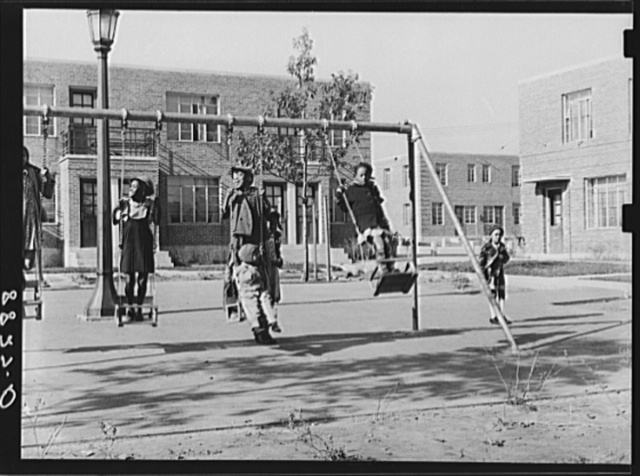
Children playing on a swing set at the Logan Fontenelle Housing Project in 1938.

The housing projects were named in honor of Logan Fontenelle, an Omaha chief. Built by the Public Works Administration during the Great Depression, Logan Fontenelle was originally built as no-cost or low-cost housing for working-class families, chiefly of European descent, including Germans, Italians and Czechs, many of them 20th century immigrants. Many young people in Logan Fontenelle during this period regarded the projects as a haven as they were a considerable improvement over previous housing they had. After supporting limited public housing in Omaha in 1936, the city's business community became adamantly opposed to Logan Fontenelle by the time it was completed in 1938.

In 1947, the maximum income allowed for a family of four at Logan Fontenelle was $2,200 per year, and they would pay a maximum rent $34.50 per month. The family was asked to find other housing if they exceeded those limits. The projects were segregated through the 1950s, with restrictions against African Americans living there.

Later, when the projects were opened to African Americans, the Logan Fontenelle Housing Projects were used together with race-restrictive covenants and redlining to keep African Americans living in North Omaha. Community programs at Logan Fontenelle included the Kellom Girls Club, which moved there in 1973 after operating at Omaha's Hilltop-Pleasantview Public Homes since 1966.

Although the projects had originally been built as transition housing for working-class people, a steep decline in jobs in Omaha during the 1950s and 1960s meant that many residents had to go on welfare. Tens of thousands of jobs were lost as railroads and the meatpacking industry restructured. The projects became a concentration of poor families with few immediate options. The rate of crime and violence began to increase in the area.

== Riot ==
In the 1960s there were riots in the Near North Side, related to problems of poverty and unemployment since the decline of the railroads, restructuring of the meatpacking industry, and deindustrialization in Omaha. Loss of tens of thousands of jobs since the 1950s had decreased investment in housing in Omaha, and services declined for a while, resulting in deteriorating conditions in structures already old. African Americans left in the community felt trapped. Riots in 1966 were associated with civil rights protests, and riots in April 1968 were associated with the assassination of Martin Luther King Jr. in Memphis, Tennessee.

In 1969 riots erupted after an Omaha police officer fatally shot teenager Vivian Strong near the Logan Fontenelle Project. Riots began immediately following the shooting and lasted three days resulting in nearly $750,000 in damage.

== Lawsuit ==
In 1990 a civil rights lawsuit on behalf of the African-American residents of Logan Fontenelle alleged that Omaha's public housing discriminated against racial minorities. A class action suit was brought against the Department of Housing and Urban Development (HUD). In Hawkins v. HUD, the US Supreme Court determined that the Omaha Housing Authority and the City of Omaha had violated the U.S. Housing Act and Title VI of the Civil Rights Act of 1968 as related to the development and administration of Omaha's public housing, and violated the Fifth and Fourteenth Amendments to the U.S. Constitution and other federal statutes, regulations and guidelines.

A 1994 settlement required that former residents displaced by HUD's planned closing of the Logan Fontenelle Housing Project would receive counseling and rent assistance, relocation assistance payments, an opportunity for additional assistance through Section 8 vouchers and certificates, and assistance to find housing in areas of Omaha with minority populations of less than 30 percent.

== Demolition and redevelopment ==
The Omaha Housing Authority began demolishing Logan Fontenelle in 1991 and 1992. The demolition was completed in 1995. Omaha's Family Housing Advisory Services was involved in helping 785 of the Logan Fontenelle residents find other homes across the city.

Today, the North Omaha Business Park, "a joint effort of the Omaha Chamber and the City of Omaha... [is] a 15-acre (61,000 m^{2}) development" on the Logan Fontenelle site. In addition, the site has an assisted-living facility, a park, single-family houses similar to those found in suburbs, and an organized neighborhood association, Concord Square. Altogether the area's housing will attract a mix of incomes.

== Notable residents ==
Seminal rock and roll pioneer Wynonie Harris lived in Logan Fontenelle for a short period in the 1940s.

Cathy Hughes, the founder and president of Radio One, grew up in Logan Fontenelle while her father was attending Creighton University. He became the first African American to earn an accounting degree at Creighton.

Hall of Fame pitcher Bob Gibson lived in Logan Fontenelle around 1942 according to his autobiography, “Stranger to The Game” co written with Lonnie Wheeler.

== See also ==
- History of Omaha

== Bibliography ==
- Loschen, D. (1990) An Analysis of the Logan Fontenelle Housing Project and the Scattered Site Housing Proposal in Omaha, Nebraska.
