= Nebraska Legal Marijuana NOW Party =

Nebraska political party advocating cannabis legalization

- Abbreviation: LMN
- Chairperson: Edward Williams
- Founder: Mark Elworth; Krystal Gabel; Edward Williams
- Founded: 2016; 10 years ago
- Headquarters: Omaha
- Membership (2026): ▲10,680
- Ideology: Marijuana legalization
- National affiliation: Legal Marijuana Now
- Colors: Green

Nebraska Legal Marijuana NOW is a political third party in the U.S. state of Nebraska established in 2016 as the state affiliate of the Legal Marijuana Now Party. Legal Marijuana NOW exceeded 10,000 members registered with the party, in 2025, qualifying for Nebraskan candidate ballot access indefinitely.

Nebraska Legal Marijuana NOW Party held United States Senate primaries in 2024, and in 2026, and the party held a 2026 gubernatorial primary. For one-hundred years prior to 2024, no Nebraska political party other than the Democratic and Republican parties had held a contested primary in a statewide race.

In 2022, Legal Marijuana NOW Party ran more candidates for Nebraska statewide offices than the Democratic Party recruited. Their nominee for Attorney General, Larry Bolinger, got 188,648 votes, more than 30 percent, the highest percentage for a statewide Nebraska candidate running outside the two major parties in 86 years, when independent George Norris was reelected to U.S. Senate. Bolinger held the record until independent Dan Osborn received 46.5% for U.S. Senator, in 2024.

== History ==
=== Earning ballot access ===
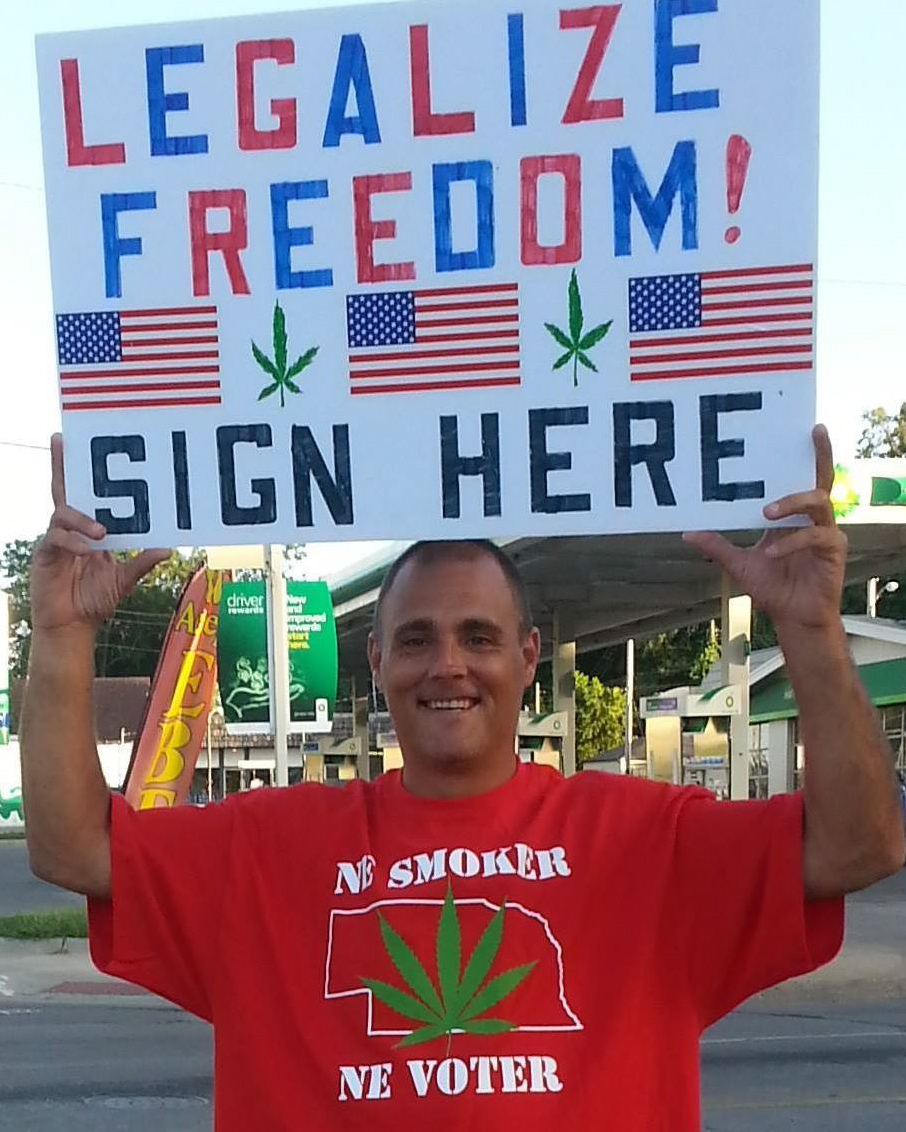
Mark Elworth petitioning for Legal Marijuana NOW in Omaha, 2015

==== 2016—2019 ====
In 2016, the Nebraska Marijuana Party petitioned to be recognized as a major political party. To make the ballot, Nebraska Marijuana Party needed valid signatures equal to at least one-percent of the total votes cast for governor in 2014, or 5,397 signatures statewide. In July, 2016, volunteers turned in 9,000 signatures to the Nebraska Secretary of State. However, the Secretary of State said that half of the signatures were invalid, falling short of the 5,397 needed.

After failing to make it onto Nebraska ballots in 2016, the organization began circulating petitions for 2020 ballot access for a Nebraska Legal Marijuana NOW Party in September, 2016. The party planned to collect 15,000 signatures for their second attempt at gaining ballot access.

==== 2020—2021 ====
Nebraska Legal Marijuana NOW Party leaders submitted their petition to the Secretary of State Bob Evnen on September 18, 2020. The party needed to collect the signatures of 6,800 registered Nebraska voters in order to qualify as an official state party. According to Mark Elworth, they turned in 15,000 signatures, just to be safe.

Evnen initially told petition drive organizers, Elworth and Krystal Gabel, on January 7, 2021, that the Legal Marijuana NOW Party petition was short by 28 signatures from Nebraska's 2nd congressional district, which includes Omaha.

On April 21, 2021, after the Secretary of State reviewed some petition signatures that were challenged, Legal Marijuana NOW gained official recognition as a state political party in Nebraska, earning the party ballot access for their candidates, and allowing Legal Marijuana NOW Party to register voters. Gabel, appointed national Legal Marijuana Now Party chair, told a reporter for the Star-Herald that the party is running several candidates in Nebraska at multiple levels of government, from United States Congress to local sheriffs.

== Since 2021 ==
=== 2022—2023 ===
In 2022, Nebraska Legal Marijuana NOW Party ran more candidates, two, for statewide offices than the Nebraska Democratic Party recruited, one. The Libertarian Party also found more candidates, three. Only the Republican Party had candidates in all five Nebraska constitutional races in 2022.

Larry Bolinger was nominated by Legal Marijuana NOW to run for Nebraska Attorney General in 2022. Bolinger, a resident of Alliance, Nebraska, focused on legalization of marijuana and expanding drug courts in the race to unseat Doug Peterson, who was seeking his third term as attorney general.

During a radio interview on February 14, 2022, Bolinger, who previously had run for the Alliance Planning Commission, said “The way the Republican and Democratic parties have been treating each other over the past several years, they’re just full of hate and vinegar. And it’s kind of disgusting. I decided to go with this new party and just support the system how it’s supposed to be. We’re supposed to work together to make things right for the people.”

Bolinger received 188,648 votes, 30.27%, in the 2022 Attorney General race, an office for which there was no Democratic Party nominee, the highest percentage for a statewide Nebraska candidate running outside the two major parties in 86 years, when independent George W. Norris was reelected to U.S. Senate. Bolinger was one of the top three third party vote-getters, in the US.

Leroy Lopez III, a Wilber bowling alley proprietor, ran for Nebraska Auditor of Public Accounts, in 2022. Lopez got 120,986 votes, finishing second in the three-way race.

=== 2024—2025 ===
For 100 years prior to 2024, no Nebraska third party had held a contested statewide primary, until Nebraska LMNP held a U.S. Senate primary between Kerry Eddy of Lincoln, and Kenneth Peterson of Beatrice May 14, 2024. The winner, Eddy, withdrew from the contest in July and endorsed independent candidate Dan Osborn over anti-marijuana incumbent Republican senator Deb Fischer.

No LMNP presidential candidates were recognized for the 2024 Nebraska primaries by Secretary of State Evnen, despite the party being ballot qualified in Minnesota, which held their presidential primary on March 5. At an online meeting of Nebraska party officers held on June 1, independent presidential candidates Cornel West and Melina Abdullah were endorsed for the Nebraska LMNP ticket.

In 2025, nine people associated with the Democratic Party and independent U.S. Senate candidate Osborn were thwarted attempting to fraudulently dissolve Legal Marijuana NOW Party, by Secretary of State Evnen. Christoph Marsh, Delanie Ness, Will Ramsey, Chelsea Richardson and five others claiming to be party vice chairs filed suspicious paperwork, according to Evnen, having contradictions with earlier filings that were made by LMNP. Evnen determined that the nine individuals were not recognized party officers at the time of filing, and he did not accept the dissolution document.

=== 2026 elections ===
==== 2026 Nebraska gubernatorial election ====
Legal Marijuana NOW Party held a gubernatorial primary between Rick Beard of Omaha and James Charvat of Valley in 2026. Beard, a chef and winery operator, was nominated for Nebraska Governor by sixty-nine percent of LMNP voters on May 12. Beard announced on August 21 his selection of running mate, Omaha Housing Authority commissioner Keenya Barnes, who serves as Omaha Performing Arts, Omaha by Design, and Table Grace Ministries community ambassador.

==== 2026 federal elections ====
On May 12, 2026, LMNP held a U.S. Senate primary between Mike Marvin and Earl Starkey. The winner, retired bus driver and labor union leader Marvin, suspended his campaign in August for health reasons, endorsing independent Osborn for U.S. Senator, though Marvin's name remains on November ballots.

Overton cattle rancher David Else, who was Democratic U.S. Representative nominee for Nebraska's 3rd congressional district in 2022 and candidate in 2024, was nominated by Legal Marijuana NOW for representative from CD3 in 2026.

== Electoral history ==
=== Results in Nebraska state elections ===
Year	Office	Candidate	Popular votes	Percentage
2022	Nebraska Attorney General	Larry Bolinger	188,648	30.27%
2022	Nebraska Auditor of Public Accounts	L. Leroy Lopez	120,986	19.32%

=== Results in federal elections ===
Year	Office	Candidate	Popular votes	Percentage
2022	United States Representative, District 3	Mark Elworth Jr.	13,015	5.90%

== Leadership ==
Mark Elworth Jr. was Nebraska Legal Marijuana NOW state chair from 2021, when the party became officially recognized, until resigning from the position in 2025. Former Vice-chair Edward Williams was elected state party chair in 2025, and Marion Beard is the party Vice-chair. Other Nebraska officers include state party secretary Desiree Brown, and treasurer Amanda Nix.

== See also ==
- Cannabis political parties of the United States
