= U.S. Marijuana Party =

American cannabis political party

- Chairwoman: Sheree Krider (Kentucky)
- Founded: 2002
- Ideology: Cannabis legalisation Civil libertarianism
- National affiliation: Legal Marijuana Now
- Colors: Red, white, blue, green

Website
- usmjparty.com

The U.S. Marijuana Party is a cannabis political party in the United States founded in 2002 by Loretta Nall specifically to end the war on drugs and to legalize cannabis. Their policies also include other socially libertarian positions. U.S. Marijuana Party candidates in Vermont have run campaigns as recently as 2016. The party has had local chapters in several other states, and has been affiliated with international cannabis political parties.

== History ==
=== 2012 presidential election ===
On September 18, 2012, the U.S. Marijuana Party endorsed Libertarian Party candidate Gary Johnson in the 2012 presidential election.

== State activity ==
=== Colorado ===
Wayward Bill Chengelis (1951-2021)

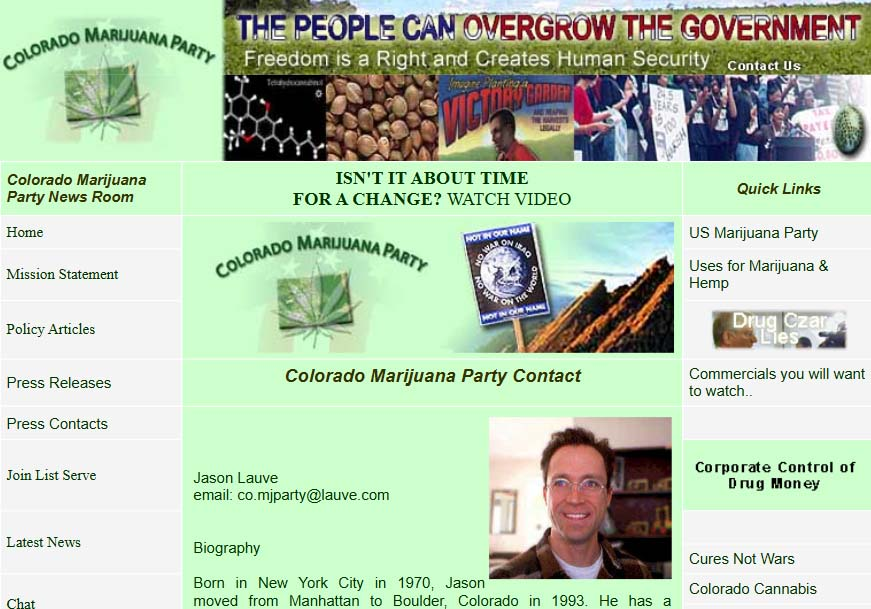
Screenshot of the Colorado U.S. Marijuana Party website, circa 2003

In Colorado, Jason Lauve ran the U.S. Marijuana Party from February 2003 through March 2005.

Wayward Bill Chengelis took over the Colorado party chapter from Lauve in 2005 and was U.S. Marijuana Party chairman for many years, until Chengelis' death in 2021.

=== Illinois ===
In 2004, Illinois Marijuana Party leader Richard Rawlings ran for U.S. Congress in Illinois' 18th Congressional District as a write-in candidate. Brian Meyer ran as a write-in candidate in the 12th Congressional District in 2004. Rawlings ran again as a Marijuana Party write-in candidate for Congress in 2010.

=== Alabama ===
The U.S. Marijuana Party was started on November 25th 2002 by Loretta Nallfrom Alexander City Alabama following her misdemeanor arrest for marijuana possession. Nall was the chairwomen of the party until she resigned in 2004 to pursue the Libertarian Party of Alabama's nomination for governor.

=== Nebraska ===
In 2015–2016, Zach Boiko, Mark Elworth Jr., and Krystal Gabel collected signatures for Marijuana Party of Nebraska to be officially recognized. In order to make the ballot, petitioners needed 5,397 signatures statewide. The party also must have a certain number of signatures from each of the state's three congressional districts.

In July, 2016, volunteers turned in 9,000 signatures to the Nebraska Secretary of State. However, the Secretary of State said that half of the signatures were invalid, falling short of the 5,397 needed. In 2016, the group changed its name to Nebraska Legal Marijuana NOW Party, and organizers began petitioning for 2018 ballot access.

=== New Jersey ===
Rastafari cannabis rights activist and businessman Edward Forchion, who founded the Legalize Marijuana Party in 1998 in New Jersey, ran for U.S. Representative for New Jersey's 3rd congressional district in 2004 as a U.S. Marijuana Party candidate. Forchion got 4,914 votes.

==== Results in federal elections ====
Year	Office	Candidate	Popular Votes	Percentage
2004	US Representative 3	Edward Forchion	4,914	1.6%

=== Vermont ===
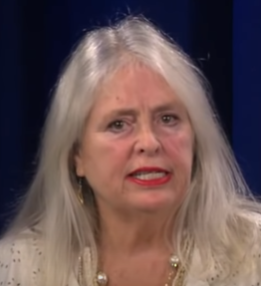
Cris Ericson, U.S. Marijuana Party 2010, 2012, and 2016 Governor of Vermont, and United States Senator nominee

Independent candidate Cris Ericson ran for Governor of Vermont in 2002 as a Make Marijuana Legal candidate. In 2004, Ericson ran for Vermont governor and U.S. senator as a Marijuana Party candidate. She went on to compete in 2006, 2008, 2014 and 2016 in Republican Party and Democratic Party primaries, and for multiple state and federal offices as an independent candidate. Ericson, a U.S. Marijuana Party candidate for United States Senator and Governor of Vermont in 2010, 2012, and 2016, ran a marijuana party write-in campaign for U.S. Senate in 2024.

==== Results in gubernatorial elections ====
Year	Candidate	Popular Votes	Percentage
2004	Cris Ericson	4,221	1.4%
2010	Cris Ericson	1,819	0.8%
2012	Cris Ericson	5,580	1.9%

==== Results in Vermont state elections ====
Year	Office	Candidate	Popular Votes	Percentage
2016	VT Senator (Caledonia County)	Galen Dively, III	2,443	9.5%

==== Results in federal elections ====
Year	Office	Candidate	Popular Votes	Percentage
2004	US Senator	Cris Ericson	6,486	2.1%
2010	US Senator	Cris Ericson	2,731	1.2%
2012	US Senator	Cris Ericson	5,919	2.0%
2016	US Senator	Cris Ericson	9,156	2.9%

=== Washington ===
In the Washington State House of Representatives District 2b election, in 2014, retired union official Rick Payne was on the August primary ballot as a Marijuana Party candidate. In Washington the top two vote-getters in the primary advance to the general election. Payne received 1,644 votes (9.3%). Defeated by the incumbent, a Republican, and a Libertarian candidate, Payne did not make it into the November general election.

== See also ==
- Cannabis political parties of the United States
- List of political parties in the United States
