= Hemp Party =

Hemp Party Hamppupuolue (Finnish) Hampapartiet (Swedish)
- Chairperson: Tapani Karvinen
- Vice chairperson: Johan Kustonen
- Founded: 2022
- Headquarters: Turku, Finland
- Ideology: Single-issue (cannabis)
- Parliament of Finland: 0 / 200

Website
- www.hamppupuolue.net

Hemp Party (Finnish: Hamppupuolue, Swedish: Hampapartiet) is a political party in Finland. The party identifies as a single-issue party concerned with legalization of cannabis. Specifically, its political program calls for the elimination of barriers to the utilization of plants in the genus Cannabis.

It claims that all other issues are conscience votes for its representatives who may vote whoever they please. It seeks to further its goal of legalization of cannabis through parliamentary and other elections.

The party was founded in 2022. It was officially registered as a political party on 28 May 2025 after having gathered the required 5,000 signatures. In 2024, it campaigned in front of the Finnish Parliament by intending to hand out seedlings of Cannabis sativa to MPs. The police, however, confiscated the illegal plants. At the time, the party criticized legislation that neglects to tell the allowable limit for tetrahydrocannabinol (THC) in plants. Former Finns Party MP Veltto Virtanen spoke at the event criticizing the illegality of the drug.

The party organizes Hamppumarssi ('Hemp March'), the Finnish chapter of the annual Global Marijuana March.

The chairperson is Tapani Karvinen and vice chairperson Johan Kustonen. The party is based in the city of Turku.

In October 2024, the Hemp Party organized a peaceful demonstration of ten people in front of the Parliament House, where the intention was to give members of Parliament cannabis seedlings. The police confiscated 199 seedlings before the event even began and took away the rest after party chair Karvinen had presented the plant to a reporter from Iltalehti.

== See also ==
- Cannabis in Finland
- Legality of cannabis
