= Limited Resources Farmer Initiative =

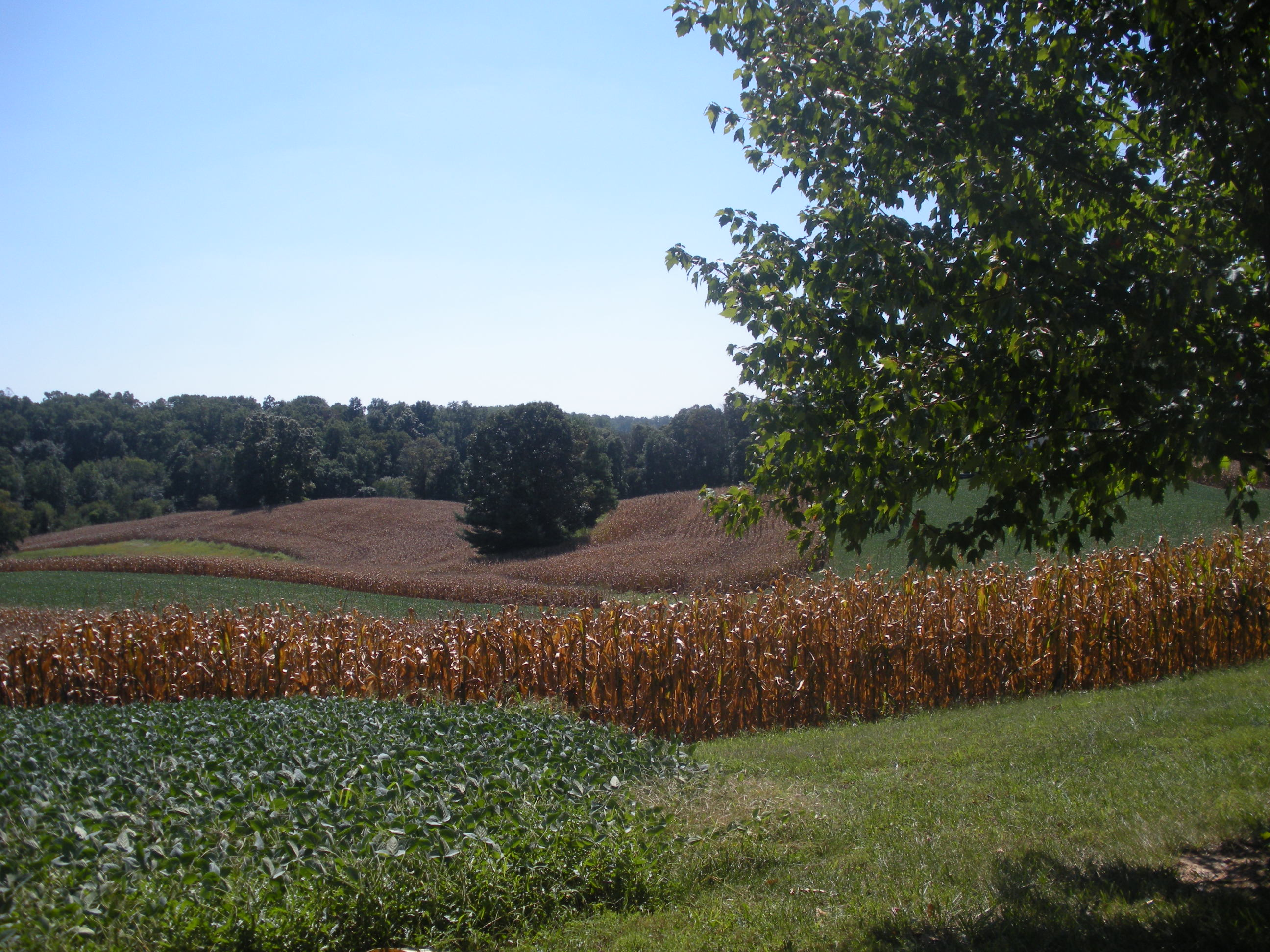

A Limited Resource Farmer or Rancher is one of a larger group of “targeted farmers" that also includes beginning farmers and ranchers and socially disadvantaged farmers and ranchers. Limited Resource Farmers are characterized by having limited farm sales and income. The USDA created the Limited Resource Farmer and Rancher program to ensure that these farmers and ranchers can develop economically viable farms, have access to USDA support, and ensure that programs are in alignment with farmer and rancher needs and concerns.

== Legislation ==
The Agricultural Credit Act of 1987 requires that Limited Resource Farmers and Ranchers be provided adequate access to USDA technical assistance programs and activities.

The Food, Conservation, and Energy Act of 2008, also known as the 2008 Farm Bill, further addresses the issues and concerns associated with Socially Disadvantaged, Beginning, and Limited Resource Farmers and Ranchers. In order to address these issues and concerns, the Act perpetuates farmer and rancher equity of access to support programs offered by the USDA. The Act calls for technical and financial assistance, improved programs and services, and flexibility in decision making.

The Agricultural Act of 2014, also known as the 2014 Farm Bill, added the category of Veteran Farmer or Rancher with the definition: The term veteran farmer or rancher (VFR) means a person who served in the United States Army, Navy, Marine Corps, Air Force, and Coast Guard, including the reserve components thereof, and who was discharged or released therefrom under conditions other than dishonorable and who also meets the definition of beginning farmer or rancher (BFR). The VFR must: a) not have operated a farm or ranch; or b) not have operated a farm or ranch for more than 10 consecutive years. For a legal entity or joint operation to be considered a VFR entity, all members must meet the definition of VFR.

== Definition ==
The term Limited Resource Farmer/Rancher was defined in October 2002 after a three-month analysis conducted by the Economic Research Service, the National Agricultural Statistics Service, the Farm Services Agency, Risk Management Agency and the Natural Resources Conservation Service. The USDA maintains this common definition for the 2002, 2008 and 2014 Farm Bills. with the site at http://www.lrftool.sc.egov.usda.gov.

USDA logo

A Limited Resource Farmer/Rancher or Forest Owner has:

- Direct or indirect gross farm sales not exceeding the current indexed value in each of the previous 2 years
- Total household income not exceeding the national poverty level for a family of 4 ($24,300 for FY2017), or less than half of the county median household income in each of the 2 tax years prior to this fiscal year.

An entity or joint operation can be considered a Limited Resource Farmer or Rancher if every involved individual of the farm or ranch qualifies independently as a Limited Resource Farmer or Rancher.

As of fiscal year 2014, gross farm sales must not exceed $173,900 in each of the previous 2 years.

== Conservation ==
The Federal Government has played a large role in assisting farmers and ranchers to incorporate conservation techniques on farms. Goals of conservation programs include reduction in soil erosion, improved air quality and water quality, and enhancement of wildlife habitat. Assistance programs include financing for conservation infrastructure, incorporation of land conservation practices, and technical support for identifying and implementing conservation strategies. Furthermore, provisions are in place for the utilization of favorable payment terms as well as other mechanisms to reduce participation barriers of "targeted farmers". The Food, Conservation, and Energy Act of 2008 projected to increase funding for conservation by over 17 percent. Farmers tend to choose to implement conservation practices that yield financial returns, best meet their needs, and for which they are most likely to receive funding.

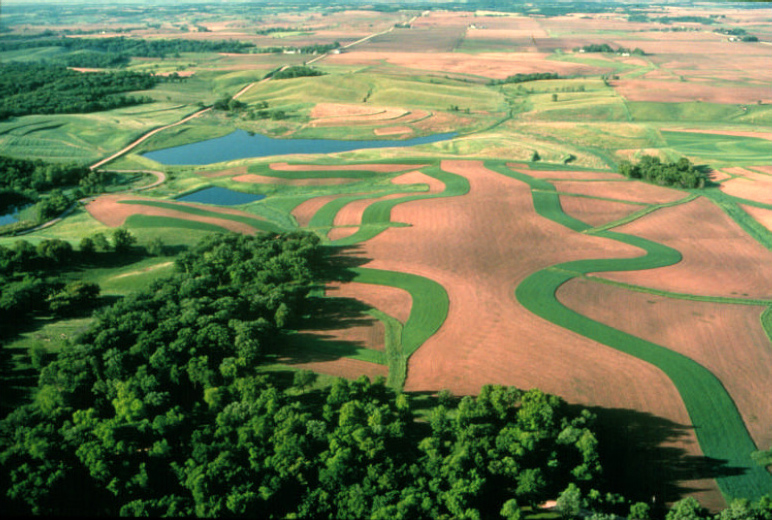
Contour buffer strips NRCS

There are several Federal Conservation Programs in place today. Three of the major programs are CRP, EQIP, and WRP.

- Conservation Reserve Program (CRP): This program implements conservation strategies by encouraging the planting of resource-conserving crop cover on environmentally sensitive land. CRP is the largest Federal conservation program, with outlays totaling $1.86 billion in 2007.
- Environmental Quality Incentives Program (EQIP): This program provides incentives and assistance in incorporating conservation infrastructure and practices on working agricultural land. In 2007, total funding for the program was $1 billion.
- Wetlands Reserve Program (WRP): This program aids in the retirement of marginal agricultural lands to facilitate enhancement of wetlands. In 2007, WRP funding totaled approximately $227 million.

The Natural Resources Conservation Service (NRCS), an agency of the USDA, provides conservation technical assistance and other resources to Limited Resource Farmers and Ranchers who, when compared to other farmers in a given area, have particular disadvantages regarding access to USDA program assistance. The NRCS determines the status of a Limited Resource Farmer or Rancher by considering income and farm sales.

== Self-Determination Tool ==
The USDA developed the Limited Resource Farmer and Rancher Online Self Determination Tool in order to enable and encourage farmers to self-determine eligibility as a Limited Resource Farmer, Rancher, or Forest Owner, and further determine eligibility for USDA programs and benefits. The tool was developed through a joint-effort of several agencies within the department, including the ERS, NASS, and NRCS and is mandated by the Farm Bill. When using the tool, the applicant first selects his or her state and county/area of residence, which then provides information specific to that area regarding the requirements of gross farm sales and income levels. The applicant can easily determine if he or she meets those requirements, and then print results.

The tool can be accessed at: https://lrftool.sc.egov.usda.gov/

== Trends and Implications ==
A report provided by the USDA Economic Research Service demonstrates particular trends of Limited Resource Farmers, as well as other "targeted" farmers. This study, conducted through an analysis of USDA data from EQIP, CRP, 2007 Census of Agriculture, and the National Resources Inventory, makes several conclusions related to Limited Resource Farmers:

- During the years 2005–2007, Limited Resource Farmers made up approximately 33 percent of all farming operations.
- Limited Resource Farmers heavily rely on off-farm income, usually coming from unearned sources such as Social Security, pensions, dividends, interest, and rent.
- Limited Resource Farmers are most likely of all targeted farmers to face liquidity constraints
- Limited Resource Farmers are less likely to adopt conservation strategies related to water quality, perhaps due to financial constraints, benefits of adopting alternative conservation practices, or the smaller nature of their farms.
- In 2006, Beginning and Limited Resource Farmers were more likely to adopt conservation strategies related to plant quality and productivity, as well animal needs.
- Limited Resource Farmers are less likely to participate in EQIP than other farmers, and therefore targeting them for participation in programs could have economic and environmental impacts.
- Limited Resource Farmers operate fewer acres, so it is important to consider whether differences are due to smaller farm size as opposed to farm type.

These conclusions demonstrate evidence that "targeted farmers" tend to operate more environmentally sensitive land, have different conservation priorities, and receive different levels of payment. Furthermore, this report suggests that economic and environmental outcomes could change with increased targeted-farmer enrollment in assistance programs. The report suggests that further research and acknowledgement of potential barriers or constraints that Limited Resource Farmers, as well as other "targeted" farmers, may encounter may help improve enrollment rates. Increased enrollment rates could potentially lead to cost-effective procurements of environmental benefits, making Limited Resource Farmer policies more effective.
