= Omaha Housing Authority =

Government agency responsible for providing public housing in Nebraska, US

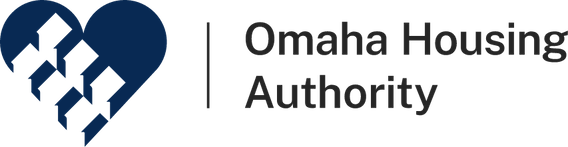

Agency overview
- Formed: May 28, 1935
- Jurisdiction: Omaha, Nebraska
- Headquarters: 1823 Harney Street Omaha, NE 68102; 41.25633°N 95.94058°W
- Employees: 170
- Agency executive: Joanie Poore, Chief Executive Officer
- Parent agency: Government of Omaha
- Website: ohauthority.org

Omaha Housing Authority is the government agency responsible for providing public housing in Omaha, Nebraska. It is the parent organization of Housing in Omaha, Inc., a nonprofit housing developer for low-income housing.

== About ==
OHA contracts with the United States Department of Housing and Urban Development to provide low-income people housing through rent subsidies and through 2700 public housing units and over 3700 Section 8 units.

=== Governance ===
OHA is governed by a five-member Board of Commissioners appointed by the mayor and confirmed by the Omaha City Council. Commissioners serve staggered five-year terms, setting policies governing the operations of OHA and directing current and future programs. OHA contracts with the Department of Housing and Urban Development to provide low-income people housing through rent subsidies and through 2700 public housing units and over 4413 Section 8 units.

=== Properties ===
- Logan Fontenelle Housing Project at North 24th and Seward Streets - Demolished
- Pleasantview Homes at 1920 North 30th Street - Demolished
- Southside Terrace Garden Apartments at 5529 South 30th Street
- Spencer Apartments at 1920 North 30th Street

== Housing in Omaha, Inc. ==
Housing in Omaha, Inc. is a non-profit affiliate corporation of the Omaha Housing Authority. HIO is a separate corporation which owns and operates its own housing units under the Section 8 New Construction program since 1979. Clifford Scott is the current Chief Executive Officer.

=== Properties ===
- Ernie Chambers Court at 4401 North 21st Street
- Bayview Apartments at 1234 South 13th Street
- Farnam Building at 1613 Farnam Street
- North Omaha Homes at 4401 North 21st Street
- Security Building at 305 South 16th Street
- Crown Creek at 4401 North 21st Street
- Benson Tower
- Highland Tower
- Jackson Tower
- Pine Tower
- Kay Jay Apartments
