= 2019 Minnesota House of Representatives district 11B special election =

2019 District 11B special election
- March 19, 2019

Minnesota House of Representatives District 11B
Nominee	Nathan Nelson	Tim Burkhardt
Party	Republican	Democratic (DFL)
Popular vote	3,572	1,647
Percentage	68.43%	31.55%
Representative before election
Jason Rarick
Republican
Elected Representative
Nathan Nelson
Republican

A special election was held in the U.S. state of Minnesota on March 19, 2019, to elect a new member for District 11B in the Minnesota House of Representatives, caused by the resignation of Republican Jason Rarick effective on February 12, 2019, after winning a special election to the Minnesota Senate. A primary election was held on March 5, 2019, to nominate a Republican candidate. Nathan Nelson, the Republican nominee, won the special election.

== Background ==
District 11B includes most of Pine County and the eastern half of Kanabec County in east-central Minnesota. Rarick began representing the district after winning election in 2014, defeating Democratic–Farmer–Labor (DFL) incumbent Tim Faust. In the last election in 2018, Rarick won with 60 percent of the vote.

== Candidates ==
The candidate filing period was from February 15 to February 19, 2019.

=== Republican Party of Minnesota ===
District 11B Republican delegates held a convention to endorse a candidate in Mora on February 19, 2019, where Clover Township board supervisor Nathan Nelson won the endorsement. Afterwards, with the exception of Ayrlahn Johnson, all other candidates withdrew from seeking the Republican nomination.

==== Declared ====
- Ayrlahn Johnson, substitute teacher
- Nathan Nelson, farmer; Clover Township board supervisor

==== Withdrawn ====
- Michael Cummins, real estate broker; candidate for the U.S. House in 2008 and the Minnesota Senate in 2010 and 2016
- Traci LeBrun, newspaper editor; small business owner
- Carl Pederson, mayor of Pine City since 2015
- Joe Wolf

=== Minnesota Democratic–Farmer–Labor Party ===
District 11B DFL delegates held a convention to endorse a candidate in Hinckley on February 18, 2019. Hinckley city council member Tim Burkhardt won the endorsement over Oliver Dykstra, who agreed to abide by the endorsement and withdrew his candidacy.

==== Declared ====
- Tim Burkhardt, member of the Hinckley city council; District 11B DFL nominee in 2018

==== Withdrawn ====
- Oliver Dykstra

== Primary election ==
=== Results ===
Party	Candidate	Votes	%
Republican Party of Minnesota	Nathan Nelson	2,371	88.40
Republican Party of Minnesota	Ayrlahn Johnson	311	11.60
Subtotal		2,682	100.00
Minnesota Democratic–Farmer–Labor Party	Tim Burkhardt	399	100.00
Total		3,081	100.00
Invalid/blank votes		33	1.06
Turnout (out of 21,515 registered voters)		3,114	14.47
Source: Minnesota Secretary of State

== Results ==
Party	Candidate	Votes	%	+/−
Republican Party of Minnesota	Nathan Nelson	3,572	68.43	+8.75
Minnesota Democratic–Farmer–Labor Party	Tim Burkhardt	1,647	31.55	–8.68
Write-ins		1	0.02	–0.07
Total		5,220	100.00	±0.00
Invalid/blank votes		6	0.11	–1.55
Turnout (out of 21,505 registered voters)		5,226	24.30	–44.44
Source: Minnesota Secretary of State

== See also ==
- 2019 Minnesota Senate District 11 special election
- List of special elections to the Minnesota House of Representatives
