= Nathan Nelson (politician) =

American politician

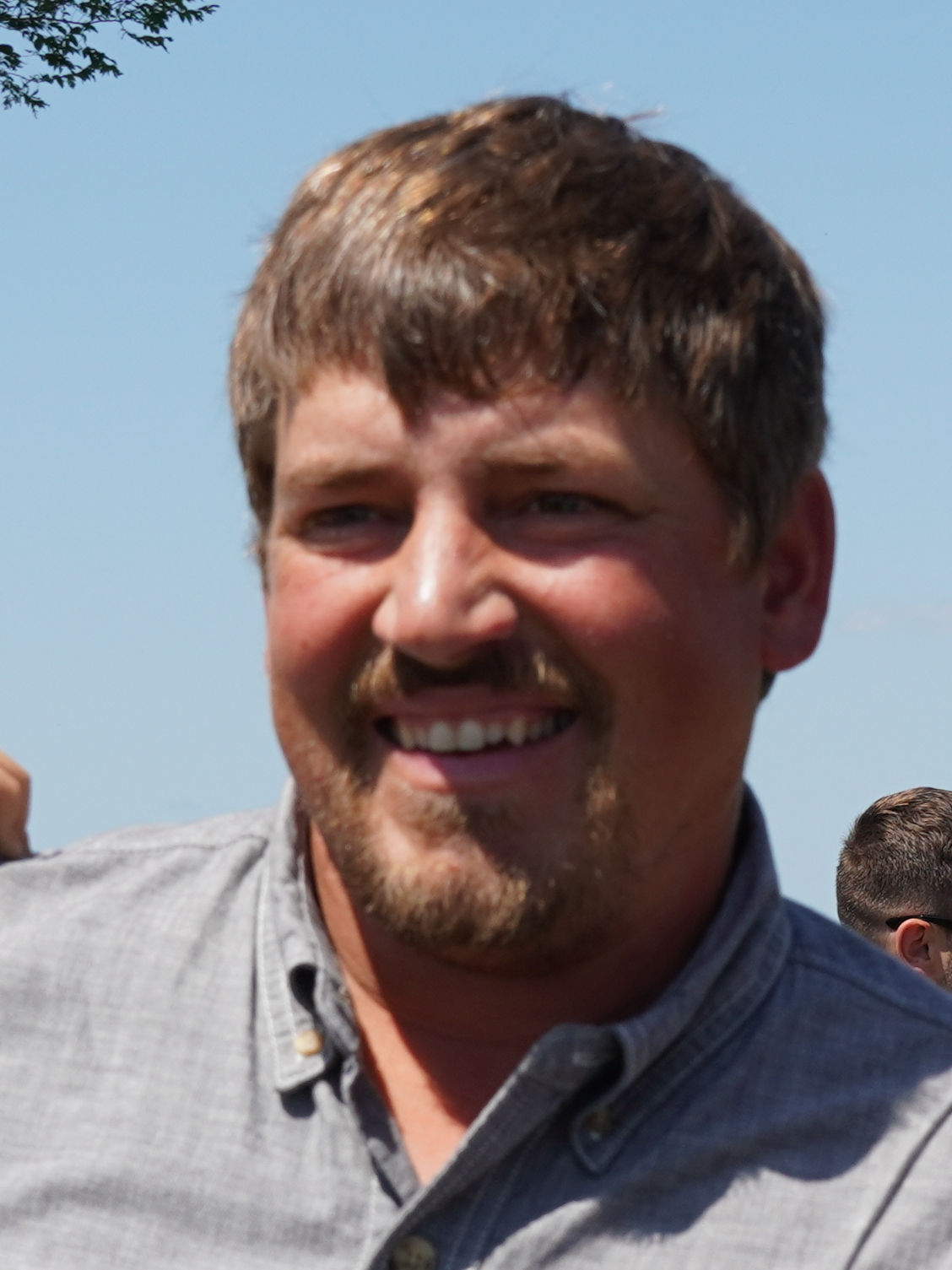

Member of the Minnesota House of Representatives from the 11B district
- Incumbent
- Assumed office March 27, 2019
- Preceded by: Jason Rarick

Personal details
- Born: January 17, 1979 (age 47) Hinckley, Minnesota, U.S.
- Party: Republican
- Spouse: Suzanna
- Children: 5
- Occupation: Farmer
- Website: Government website Campaign website

Nathan Nelson (born January 17, 1979) is an American politician serving in the Minnesota House of Representatives since 2019. A member of the Republican Party of Minnesota, Nelson represents District 11B in east-central Minnesota, which includes the cities of Mora, Rush City and Hinckley, and parts of Chisago, Kanabec and Pine Counties.

== Early life, education, and career ==
Nelson was born in Hinckley, Minnesota, and grew up on a dairy farm. He graduated from Hinckley-Finlayson High School in 1997, and is a third-generation dairy farmer.

Nelson was a member of the Clover Township Board of Supervisors for nine years and is the president of the Pine County Farm Bureau.

== Minnesota House of Representatives ==
Nelson was elected to the Minnesota House of Representatives in a special election on March 19, 2019. He won a full term in November 2020 and was reelected in 2022. He first ran after three-term Republican incumbent Jason Rarick resigned to run for a seat in the Minnesota Senate.

Nelson serves on the Agriculture Finance and Policy, Children and Families Finance and Policy, and the Workforce Development Finance and Policy Committees.

=== Political positions ===
Nelson advocated a wolf hunt, saying they are a problem for farmers and ranchers in rural Minnesota. In 2022, he spoke out on a bill to address the 2021 drought and to fund rural broadband, calling it "too little, too late for many".

== Electoral history ==
2019 Republican Primary for Minnesota State House - District 11B Special Election
Party	Candidate	Votes	%
Republican	Nathan Nelson	2,371	88.40
Republican	Ayrlahn Johnson	311	11.60
Total votes		2,682	100.0

2019 Minnesota State House - District 11B Special Election
Party	Candidate	Votes	%
Republican	Nathan Nelson	3,572	68.43
Democratic (DFL)	Tim Burkhardt	1,647	31.55
Write-in		1	0.02
Total votes		5,220	100.0
Republican hold			

2020 Minnesota State House - District 11B
Party	Candidate	Votes	%
Republican	Nathan Nelson (incumbent)	13,484	65.34
Democratic (DFL)	Jack Frechette	7,145	34.62
Write-in		9	0.04
Total votes		20,638	100.0
Republican hold			

2022 Minnesota State House - District 11B
Party	Candidate	Votes	%
Republican	Nathan Nelson (incumbent)	12,136	68.36
Democratic (DFL)	Eric Olson	5,603	31.56
Write-in		13	0.07
Total votes		17,752	100.0
Republican hold			

== Personal life ==
Nelson lives in Hinckley with his spouse, Suzanna. They have five children.
