= Snow grooming =

Snow trail compaction

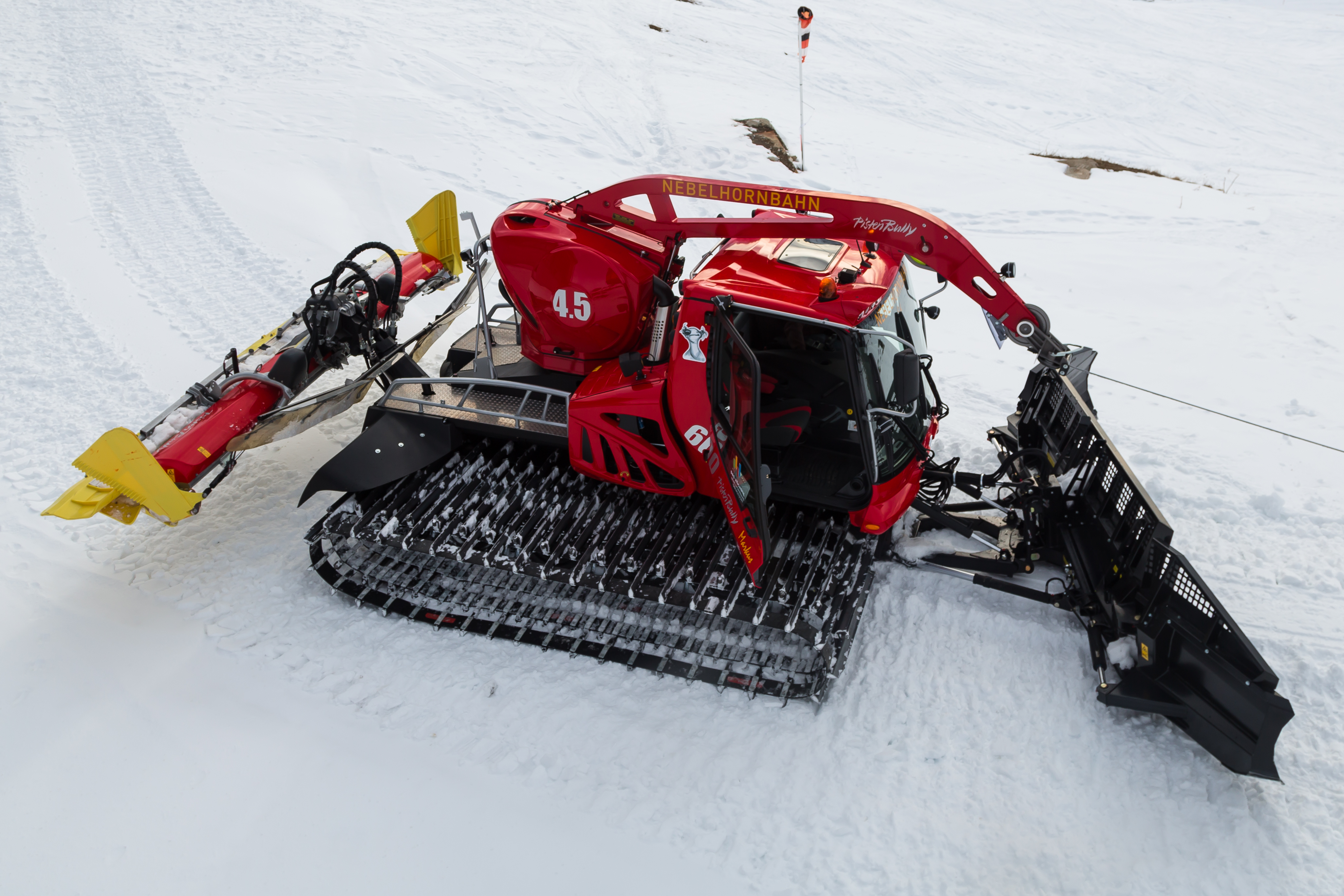
A snow groomer for alpine slopes with plow, a surface finishing attachment for ski slopes, and a cable winch for grooming steep slopes

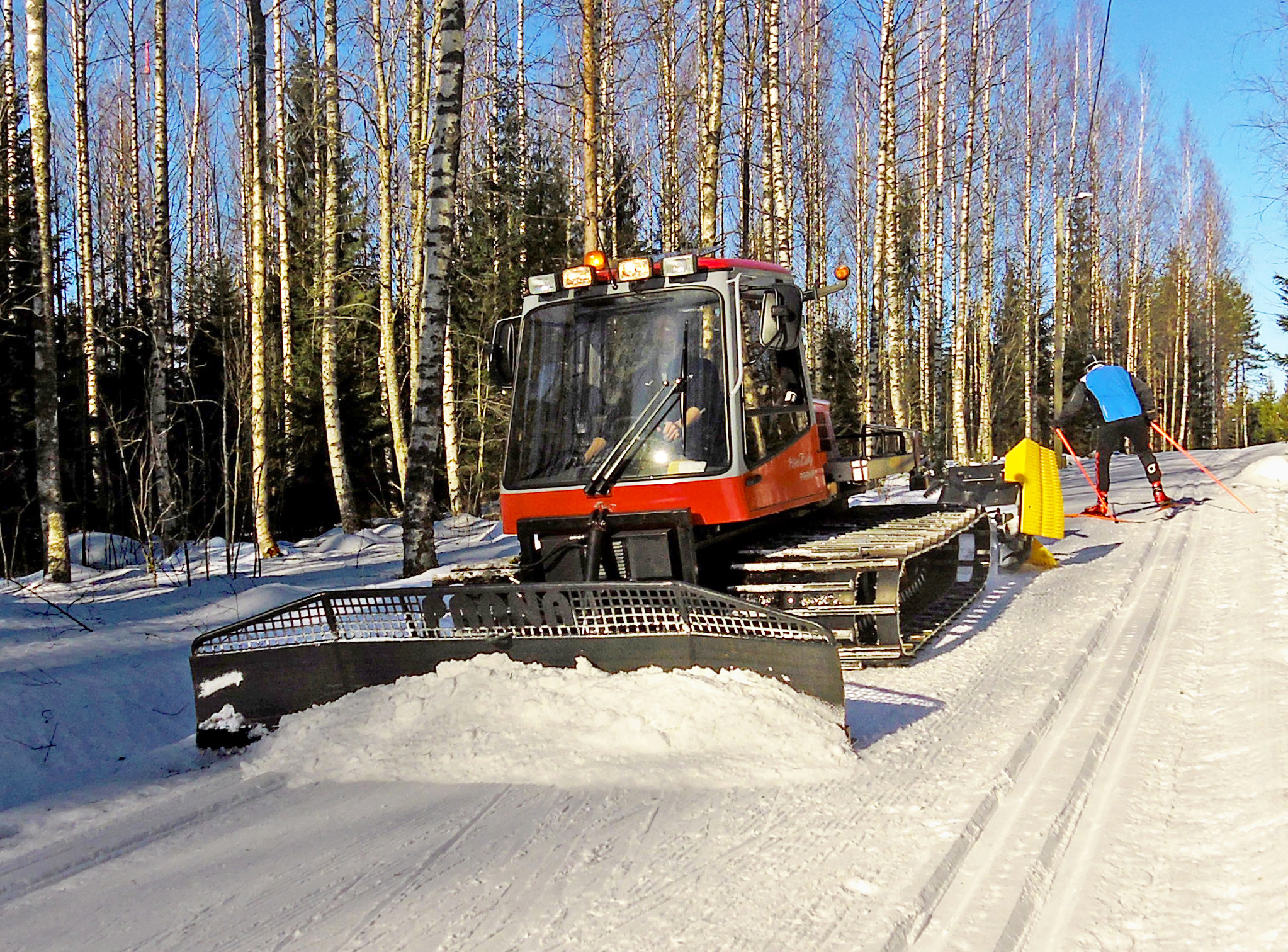
A snow groomer for cross-country trails with snow plow and attachments for the skate and classical lanes.

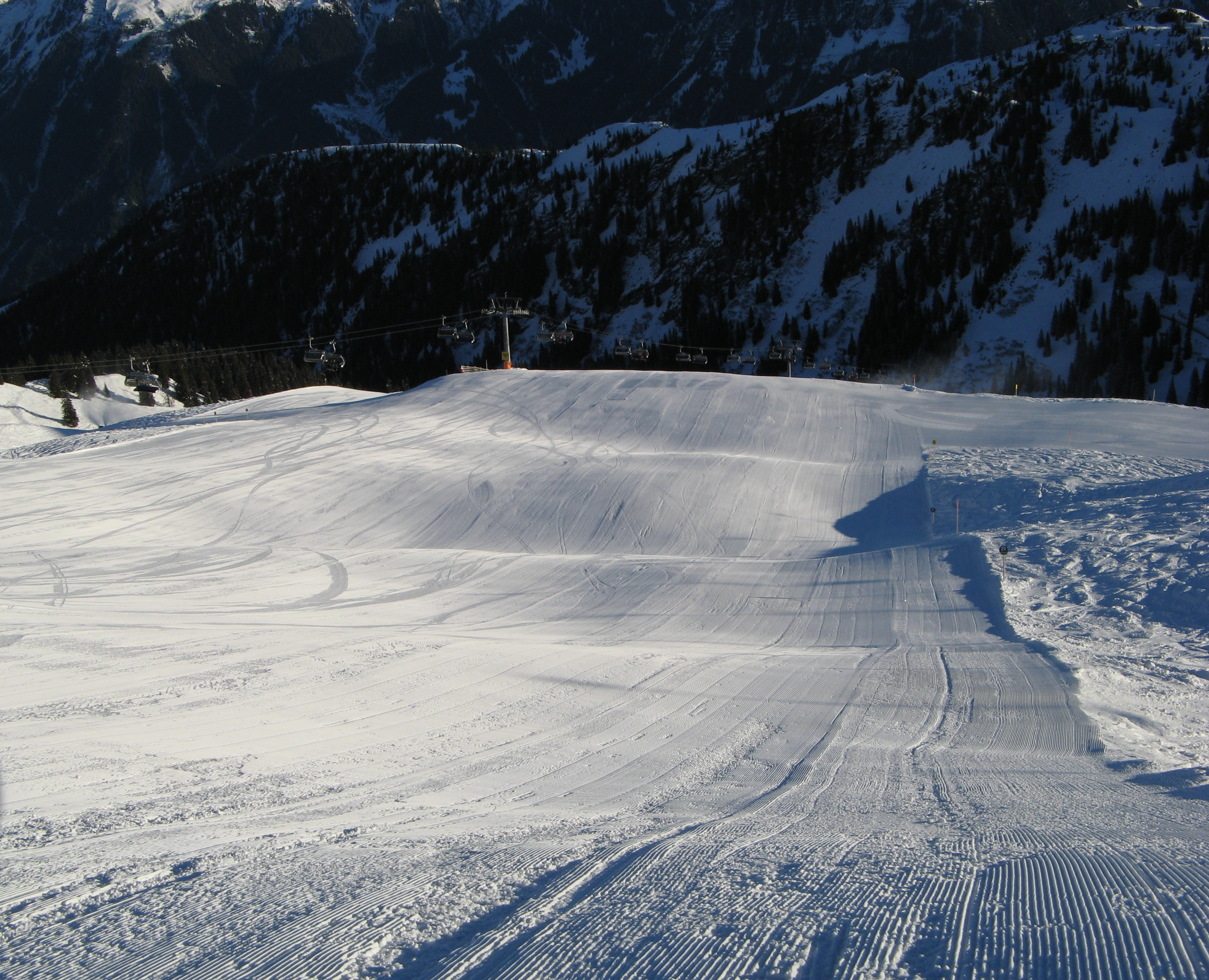
A groomed alpine skiing piste or trail

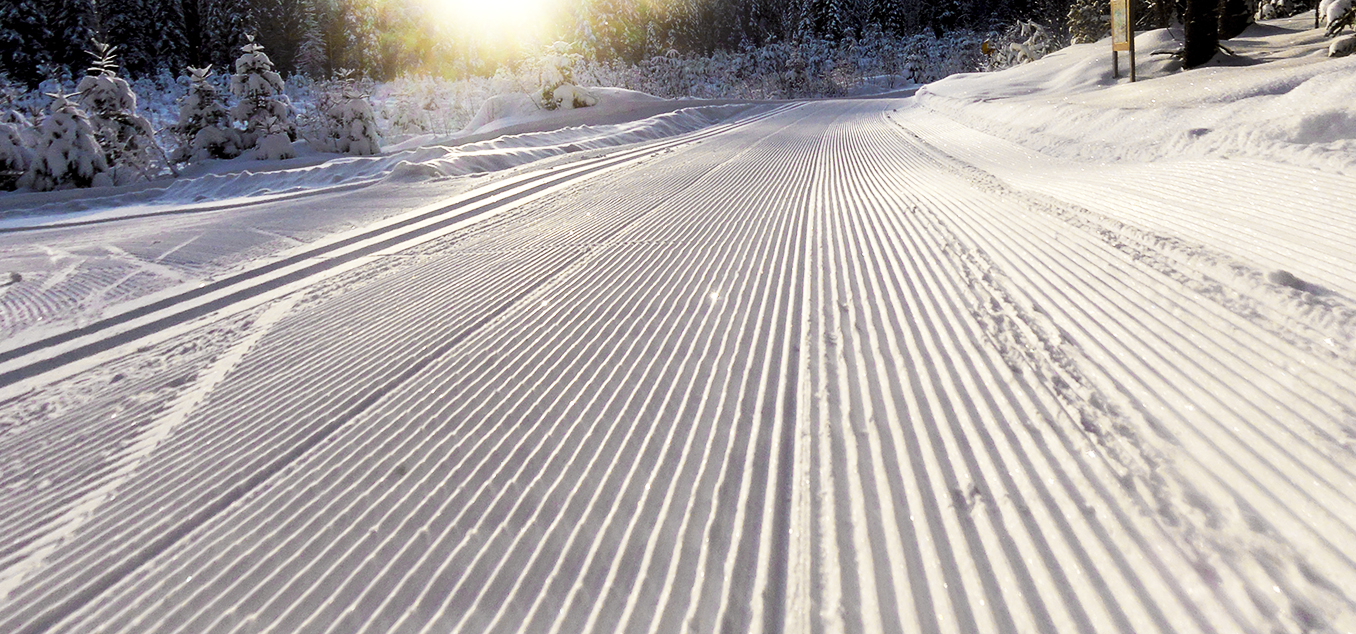
A groomed cross-country trail, showing corduroy for skate-skiing and classic tracks (left)

Snow grooming is the process of manipulating snow for recreational uses with a tractor, snowmobile, piste caterpillar, truck or snowcat towing specialized equipment. The process is used to maintain ski hills, cross-country ski trails and snowmobile trails by grooming (moving, flattening, rototilling, or compacting) the snow on them. A variation of the technique is used to construct snow runways in Antarctica.

A snow groomer is usually employed to pack snow and improve skiing and snowboarding and snowmobile trail conditions. The resulting pattern on the snow is known as corduroy, and is widely regarded as a good surface on which to ski or ride. Snow groomers can also move accumulated snow made by snow machines as part of a process, called "snow farming".

== Snow groomer ==
A snow groomer (informally called a "piste basher" in the United Kingdom) is a tracked vehicle equipped in front with a shovel (or dozer blade) and behind with a cutter (or roller). It is usually driven by diesel engines. When the machine drives over a snowfield, it pushes snow ahead of it and, at the same time, smooths out any surface unevenness.

Snow groomers built for ski slopes employ front mounted, hydraulically operated blades, powered rotary tillers and specialized shaping equipment for not only maintaining ski slopes, but also for building half pipes, terrain parks and snow tube parks. Cross-country skiing trails are also groomed in similar fashion, often with a wide "corduroy" area that allows skate-skiing plus classic ski tracks, imprinted with specialized ski guides. Manufacturers include Kässbohrer Geländefahrzeug (Germany), Prinoth (Italy), Tucker Sno-Cat (US), the Ohara Corporation (Japan), Zaugg (Switzerland), Favero Snow Tech (Italy) and Aztec/CM Dupon (France).

Snow groomers can handle very steep gradients due to their low centre of gravity and large contact area, but they can also be assisted by winches. Using cable lengths of up to 1,200 metres and a tractive force of up to 4.8 tonnes, winches can support the machines on steep slopes.

Snow groomers warn skiers and snowboarders with visual or acoustic signals. Groomers are mostly sent out during the night time after the close of the ski area so as not to interfere with daily and night skiing.

Due to their mobility and low ground pressure (typically 0.040 to 0.060 kg/cm^{2} (about 4 to 6 kN/m^{2}) snow groomers are sometimes used elsewhere, e.g. for agricultural purposes, moving bulk goods, working on peat bogs or at biogas sites.

== Snow grooming equipment ==
Snow grooming equipment towed by a smaller vehicle like a Side-by-Side UTV or snowmobile can be used for maintaining narrow paths, laying Nordic cross-country ski trails, or fatbike trails. These compact snow groomers make corduroy trails where a large snow groomer cannot access.

== Snow farming ==
Snow farming is the use of obstacles, equipment and knowledge about management of snow in order to strategically manipulate snow coverage. Often this is done for the purpose of skiing or even preventing snow drift in certain areas like roads. The most popular obstacle is the snow fence, which is used to create drifts and collect more snow in a given area than would otherwise naturally occur. The snow can be moved to other areas and groomed with the use of a snow groomer. Sometimes the snow fence is readily movable in order to maximize the collection of blown snow, despite wind direction changes. In Mora, Minnesota, the annual Vasaloppet USA cross-country ski race would be in jeopardy without the use of snow farming to compensate for the lack of natural snow in recent years.

== Snow runway construction ==
Snow grooming is used in construction and maintenance of airstrips to support research stations in Antarctica. U.S. Army Cold Regions Research and Engineering Laboratory (CRREL) researchers described the engineering parameters necessary to make improvements to natural snow for use in landing fields. One level of improvement is used to support aircraft with skis. In 2016, CRREL researchers perfected field preparation practices that allow for use of heavy military transport and other wheeled aircraft on snow runways in Antarctica. Proof-of-concept tests employed a C-17. Wheeled aircraft capability exists at the US McMurdo Station and ski landings are routine at the Australian Davis Station.
