= Mora, Minnesota =

Mora
- City
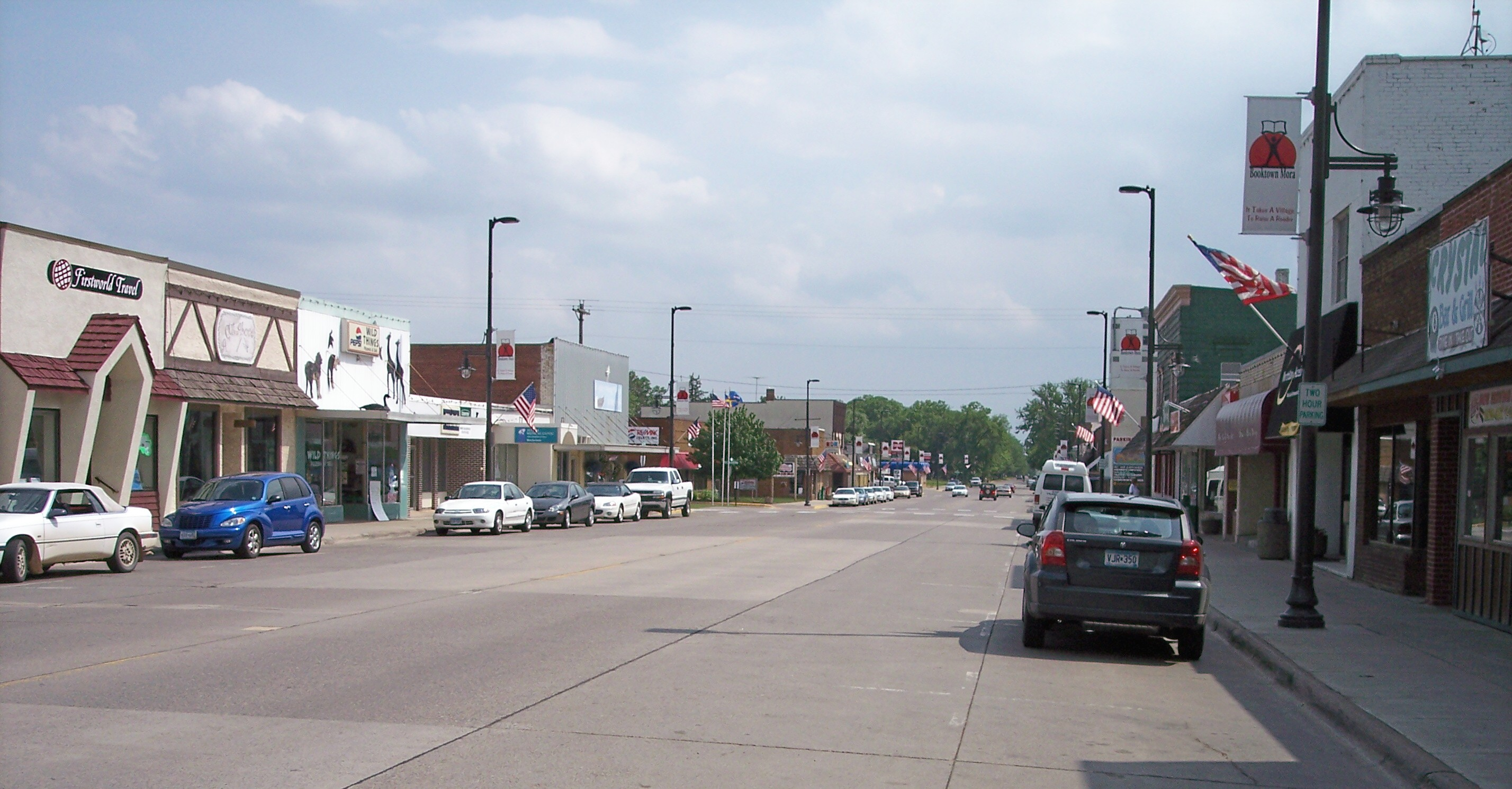
- Union Street in downtown Mora in May 2007
- Motto: "A City For All Seasons"
- Location of Mora within Kanabec County and state of Minnesota
- Coordinates: 45°52′26″N 93°17′32″W
- Country: United States
- State: Minnesota
- County: Kanabec
- Named for: Mora, Sweden

Government
  - Type: Mayor-council Government
  - Mayor: Jake Mathison
  - Mayor Pro Tem: Dave Youngquist

Area
  - Total: 5.42 sq mi (14.04 km^{2})
  - Land: 5.17 sq mi (13.38 km^{2})
  - Water: 0.25 sq mi (0.66 km^{2})
- Elevation: 1,011 ft (308 m)

Population (2020)
  - Total: 3,665
  - Density: 709.7/sq mi (274.01/km^{2})
  - Demonym: Moran
- Time zone: UTC-6 (Central (CST))
  - Summer (DST): UTC-5 (CDT)
- ZIP code: 55051
- Area code: 320
- FIPS code: 27-44044
- GNIS feature ID: 2395396
- Website: ci.mora.mn.us

Mora is a city and the county seat of Kanabec County, Minnesota. It is at the junction of Minnesota highways 23 and 65 and is along the Snake River. The population was 3,665 at the 2020 census.

== History ==
Mora was platted in 1882 by Myron Kent. The city was named after Mora, Sweden, when Israel Israelson suggested his hometown's name in Dalarna County, Sweden. The post office opened on February 27, 1883. Kent was Mora's first postmaster.

== Geography ==
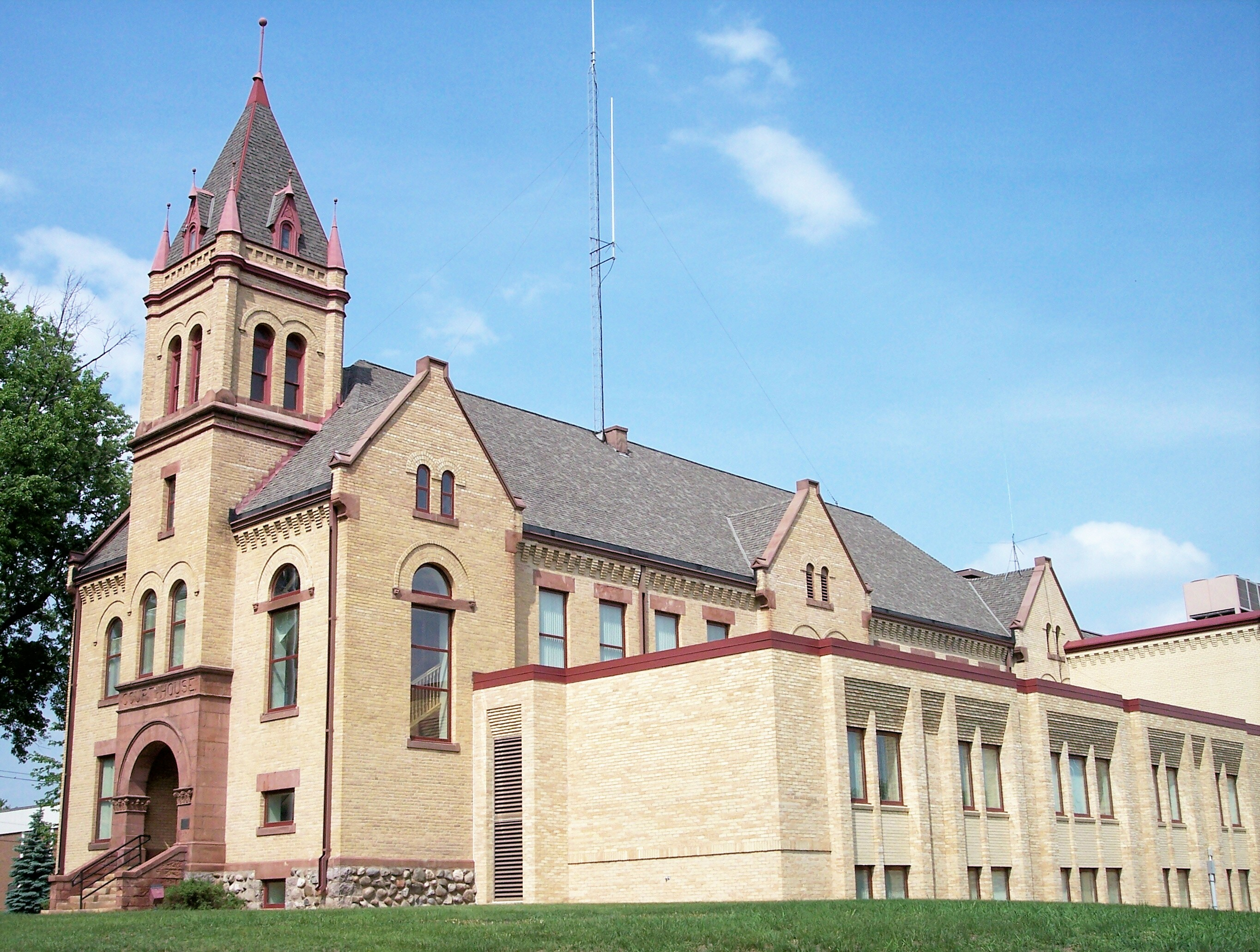
The Kanabec County Courthouse in 2007

According to the United States Census Bureau, the city has an area of 5.27 square miles (13.65 km^{2}), of which 5.00 square miles (12.95 km^{2}) is land and 0.27 square miles (0.70 km^{2}) is water.

Mora is 72 miles north of Minneapolis-St. Paul at the intersection of Minnesota highways 23 and 65. It is 52 miles northeast of St. Cloud and 91 miles southwest of Duluth.

Mora is along the Snake River.

== Demographics ==
Historical population
Census	Pop.	Note	%±
1900	785		—
1910	892		13.6%
1920	1,006		12.8%
1930	1,014		0.8%
1940	1,494		47.3%
1950	2,018		35.1%
1960	2,329		15.4%
1970	2,582		10.9%
1980	2,890		11.9%
1990	2,905		0.5%
2000	3,139		8.1%
2010	3,571		13.8%
2020	3,665		2.6%
U.S. Decennial Census

=== 2020 census ===
As of the 2020 census, Mora had a population of 3,665. The median age was 42.1 years. 20.9% of residents were under the age of 18 and 24.7% were 65 years of age or older. For every 100 females, there were 86.3 males, and for every 100 females age 18 and over there were 82.0 males age 18 and over.

100.0% of residents lived in rural areas.

There were 1,555 households, of which 25.5% had children under the age of 18 living in them. Of all households, 33.6% were married-couple households, 19.9% had a male householder with no spouse or partner present, and 35.9% had a female householder with no spouse or partner present. About 39.9% of all households were made up of individuals, and 20.8% had someone living alone who was 65 years of age or older.

There were 1,676 housing units, of which 7.2% were vacant. The homeowner vacancy rate was 3.7% and the rental vacancy rate was 3.2%.

Racial composition as of the 2020 census
Race	Number	Percent
White	3,395	92.6%
Black or African American	29	0.8%
American Indian and Alaska Native	50	1.4%
Asian	16	0.4%
Native Hawaiian and Other Pacific Islander	0	0.0%
Some other race	10	0.3%
Two or more races	165	4.5%
Hispanic or Latino (of any race)	66	1.8%

=== 2010 Census ===
As of the census of 2010, there were 3,571 people, 1,513 households, and 857 families living in the city. The population density was 714.2 inhabitants per square mile (275.8/km^{2}). There were 1,684 housing units at an average density of 336.8 per square mile (130.0/km^{2}). The racial makeup of the city was 98.4% White, 0.2% African American, 0.3% Native American 0.3% from other races, and 0.9% from two or more races. Hispanic or Latino of any race were 2.2% of the population.

There were 1,513 households, of which 28.1% had children under the age of 18 living with them, 37.6% were married couples living together, 13.4% had a female householder with no husband present, 5.6% had a male householder with no wife present, and 43.4% were non-families. 37.8% of all households were made up of individuals, and 20.3% had someone living alone who was 65 years of age or older. The average household size was 2.21 and the average family size was 2.87.

The median age in the city was 39.6 years. 23.4% of residents were under the age of 18; 8.4% were between the ages of 18 and 24; 23% were from 25 to 44; 23.3% were from 45 to 64; and 21.8% were 65 years of age or older. The gender makeup of the city was 47.2% male and 52.8% female.

=== 2000 Census ===
As of the census of 2000, there were 3,139 people, 1,381 households, and 814 families living in the city. The population density in the year 2000 was 781.2 per square mile (301.4/km^{2}). There were 1,471 housing units at an average density of 359.9 per square mile (139.0/km^{2}). The racial makeup of the city was 96.71% White, 0.28% African American, 1.28% Native American, 0.19% Asian, 0.03% Pacific Islander, 0.25% from other races, and 1.25% from two or more races. 1.57% of the population were Hispanic or Latino of any race.

There were 1,381 households, out of which 29.2% had children under the age of 18 living with them, 43.2% were married couples living together, 11.8% had a female householder with no husband present, and 41.0% were non-families. 36.9% of all households were made up of individuals, and 21.2% had someone living alone who was 65 years of age or older. The average household size was 2.23 and the average family size was 2.89.

In the city, the population was spread out, with 24.3% under the age of 18, 8.2% from 18 to 24, 24.3% from 25 to 44, 19.9% from 45 to 64, and 23.3% who were 65 years of age or older. The median age was 40 years. For every 100 females, there were 84.6 males. For every 100 females age 18 and over, there were 80.7 males.

The median income for a household in the city was $30,566, and the median income for a family was $40,577. Males had a median income of $32,222 versus $21,797 for females. The per capita income for the city was $17,949. 9.0% of the population and 6.0% of families were below the poverty line. Out of the total population, 7.7% of those under the age of 18 and 10.1% of those 65 and older were living below the poverty line.

== Infrastructure ==
=== Historical ===
On October 27, 1882 the first train to arrive in Mora was a construction train pulled by a wood burner locomotive, eventually the town would be linked to the Hinckley branch of the Minneapolis- St. Cloud line.

=== Transportation ===
Mora is served by the Mora Municipal Airport and Timber Trails Transit, a bus service in Kanabec and Mille Lacs counties.

==== Major highways ====
The following routes run through Mora:

- Minnesota State Highway 23
- Minnesota State Highway 65

The following county roads also serve as important routes in Mora:

- Kanabec County Road 1
- Kanabec County Road 6
- Kanabec County Road 27

== Arts and Culture ==
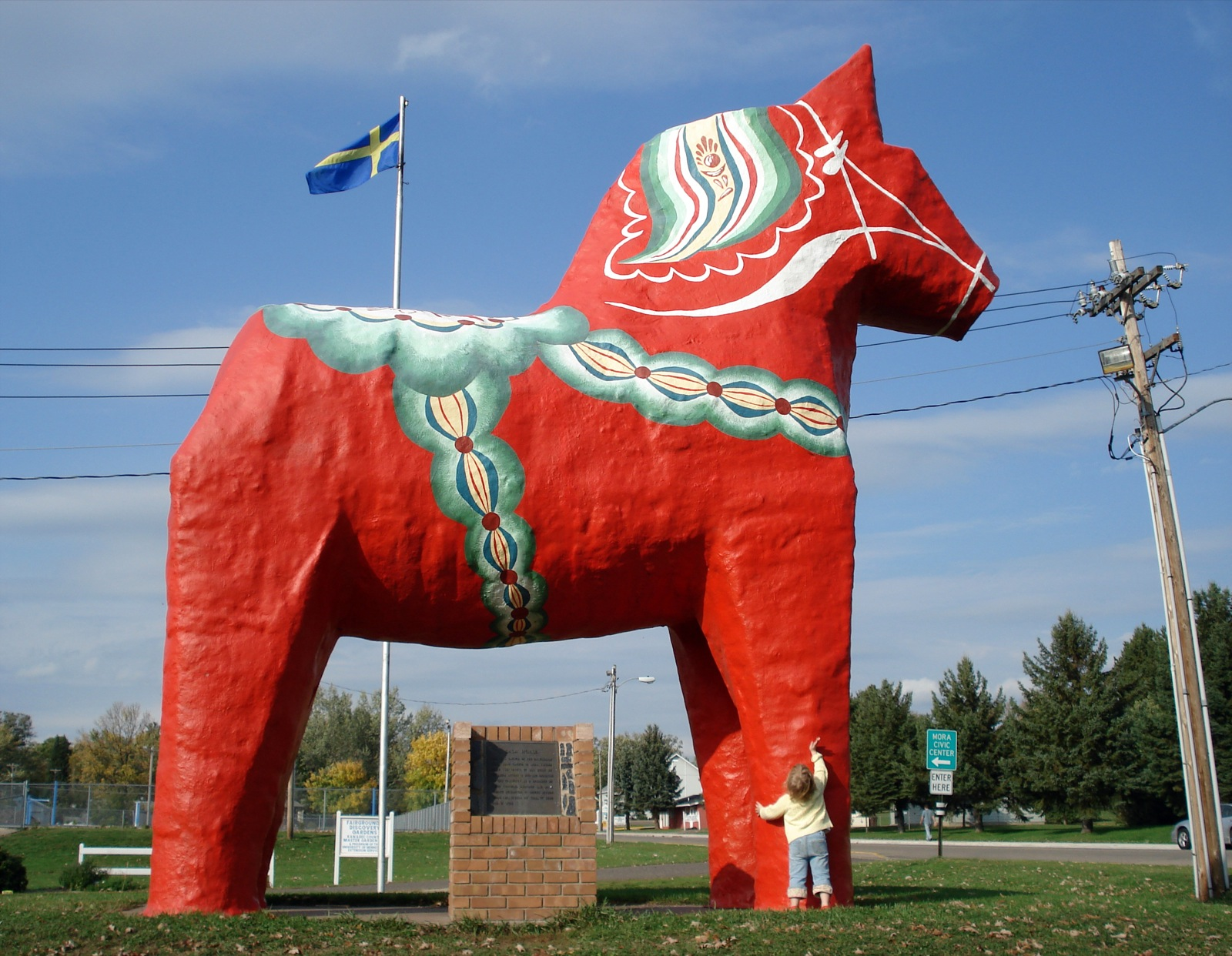
Mora's Dalecarlian horse emulates the large Swedish horse

Mora is the home of a gigantic Dala horse and a Mora clock commemorating the town's Swedish roots. Mora's sister city and namesake is Mora, Sweden, known as the endpoint of the Vasaloppet. They became sister cities in 1972 when the Dala horse was dedicated.

Each February, Mora hosts the Vasaloppet USA, Minnesota's largest cross-country skiing event. Mora also hosts the Snake River Canoe Race, the Mora Half-Marathon, and the Mora Bicycle Tour.

== Economy ==
=== Top employers ===
According to the city's 2022 Comprehensive Annual Financial Report (CAFR), its top employers are:

#	Employer	# of Employees
1	Welia Health	589
2	Mora Public Schools	354
3	Commercial Plastics	254
4	Kanabec County	217
5	St. Clare Living Community	125
6	Coborns, Inc.	121
7	Lakes & Pines Community Action Council	109
8	Recovering Hope Treatment Center	82
9	OlymPak	76
10	RJ Mechanical	76

== Climate ==
Climate data for Mora, Minnesota, 1991–2020 normals, extremes 1904–present
Month	Jan	Feb	Mar	Apr	May	Jun	Jul	Aug	Sep	Oct	Nov	Dec	Year
Record high °F (°C)	54 (12)	59 (15)	80 (27)	94 (34)	107 (42)	101 (38)	108 (42)	104 (40)	105 (41)	91 (33)	75 (24)	59 (15)	108 (42)
Mean maximum °F (°C)	40.7 (4.8)	46.3 (7.9)	60.6 (15.9)	75.5 (24.2)	85.4 (29.7)	90.0 (32.2)	91.0 (32.8)	89.5 (31.9)	85.5 (29.7)	78.0 (25.6)	59.9 (15.5)	43.9 (6.6)	93.2 (34.0)
Mean daily maximum °F (°C)	20.7 (−6.3)	26.2 (−3.2)	38.6 (3.7)	53.1 (11.7)	66.7 (19.3)	75.8 (24.3)	80.3 (26.8)	78.4 (25.8)	70.4 (21.3)	56.1 (13.4)	39.4 (4.1)	26.1 (−3.3)	52.7 (11.5)
Daily mean °F (°C)	10.6 (−11.9)	15.3 (−9.3)	28.2 (−2.1)	42.1 (5.6)	55.0 (12.8)	64.7 (18.2)	69.2 (20.7)	67.0 (19.4)	58.7 (14.8)	45.4 (7.4)	30.9 (−0.6)	17.5 (−8.1)	42.0 (5.6)
Mean daily minimum °F (°C)	0.5 (−17.5)	4.3 (−15.4)	17.7 (−7.9)	31.1 (−0.5)	43.3 (6.3)	53.5 (11.9)	58.0 (14.4)	55.6 (13.1)	47.0 (8.3)	34.7 (1.5)	22.4 (−5.3)	8.9 (−12.8)	31.4 (−0.3)
Mean minimum °F (°C)	−23.7 (−30.9)	−18.2 (−27.9)	−6.3 (−21.3)	17.2 (−8.2)	29.8 (−1.2)	39.8 (4.3)	46.8 (8.2)	45.1 (7.3)	31.0 (−0.6)	20.7 (−6.3)	3.4 (−15.9)	−14.9 (−26.1)	−26.2 (−32.3)
Record low °F (°C)	−48 (−44)	−46 (−43)	−35 (−37)	−4 (−20)	15 (−9)	23 (−5)	33 (1)	27 (−3)	13 (−11)	4 (−16)	−26 (−32)	−52 (−47)	−52 (−47)
Average precipitation inches (mm)	0.74 (19)	0.85 (22)	1.59 (40)	2.51 (64)	3.77 (96)	4.35 (110)	4.70 (119)	4.17 (106)	3.27 (83)	2.92 (74)	1.65 (42)	1.16 (29)	31.68 (804)
Average snowfall inches (cm)	10.3 (26)	10.7 (27)	8.3 (21)	4.3 (11)	0.0 (0.0)	0.0 (0.0)	0.0 (0.0)	0.0 (0.0)	0.0 (0.0)	0.4 (1.0)	5.4 (14)	12.6 (32)	52.0 (132)
Average precipitation days (≥ 0.01 in)	7.3	6.1	6.8	9.2	11.0	12.1	10.8	10.3	9.6	9.8	7.1	8.4	108.5
Average snowy days (≥ 0.1 in)	6.0	4.7	3.6	1.4	0.1	0.0	0.0	0.0	0.0	0.4	3.2	6.7	26.1
Source 1: NOAA
Source 2: National Weather Service

== Notable people ==
- Roger Crawford, Minnesota state representative
- Bill Diessner, Minnesota state senator
- Alice Frost, actress
- Gladys Nordenstrom, contemporary classical composer
- Henry Rines, Minnesota state treasurer and speaker of the Minnesota House of Representatives
- Judy Soderstrom, Minnesota state representative
- Dan Stevens, Minnesota state senator
