= Christina Garsten =

Swedish social anthropologist

- Born: 28 January 1962 (age 64); Mora, Sweden
- Occupation: Social anthropologist

Academic background
- Education: Stockholm University
- Thesis: Apple World: Core and Periphery in a Transnational Organizational Culture (1994)

Christina Garsten (born 28 January 1962 in Mora, Sweden) is a Swedish social anthropologist, focusing on organizational anthropology. She is a permanent fellow at the Swedish Collegium for Advanced Study, and is President of the European network of institutes for advanced study, NetIAS. Since 2025, Garsten is Editorial Fellow, Paris Institute for Advanced Study, France, Affiliated Faculty at Tokyo College, University of Tokyo and an elected Member of Academia Europaea.

== Biography ==
In 1994, Garsten graduated with the degree of doctor of philosophy in social anthropology from Stockholm University with the dissertation Apple World: Core and Periphery in a Transnational Organizational Culture. Garsten became professor at Stockholm University in 2008. Since 2011, she has been chairperson at the Stockholm Centre for Organizational Research (SCORE) and since 2018, principal and permanent fellow at the Swedish Collegium for Advanced Study in Uppsala. Between 2013 and 2015, Garsten was professor of globalization and organization at Copenhagen Business School in Copenhagen, Denmark.

She has been visiting professor at Georgetown University, ESCP Paris and Centre de Sociologie des Organisations (Sciences Po) as well as visiting researcher at Stanford University, London School of Economics and Political Science, École des Hautes Études en Sciences Sociales, University of Cambridge, European University Institute, Copenhagen Business School (CBS) and University of Leeds.

In 2022 Garsten became President of the European network of institutes for advanced study, NetIAS.

Garsten is a member of the editorial committee of the journals Organization, European Management Journal and the Scandinavian Journal of Management and of the editorial board of American Anthropologist. She was one of the founding members of the Journal of Business Anthropology.

== Selected books ==
- Discreet Power: How the World Economic Forum Shapes Global Markets, med Adrienne Sörbom (2018)
- Power, Policy and Profit: Corporate Engagement in Politics and Governance, ed. with Adrienne Sörbom (2017)
- Makt utan mandat, with Bo Rothstein and Stefan Svallfors (2015)
- Makeshift Work in a Changing Labour Market: The Swedish Model in the Post–Financial Crisis Era, ed. with Jessica Lindvert and Renita Thedvall (2015)
- Anthropology Now and Next: Diversity, Connections, Confrontations, Reflexivity, ed. with Thomas Hylland Eriksen and Shalini Randeria (2014)
- Organisational Anthropology, ed. with Anette Nyqvist (2013)
- Ethical Dilemmas in Management, ed. with Tor Hernes (2009)
- Workplace Vagabonds (2008)
- Organizing Transnational Accountability, ed. with Magnus Boström (2008)
- Transparency in a New Global Order, ed. with Monica Lindh de Montoya (2008)
