= Mora Church =

Coordinates: 61.0072°N 14.5414°E

- Mora kyrka
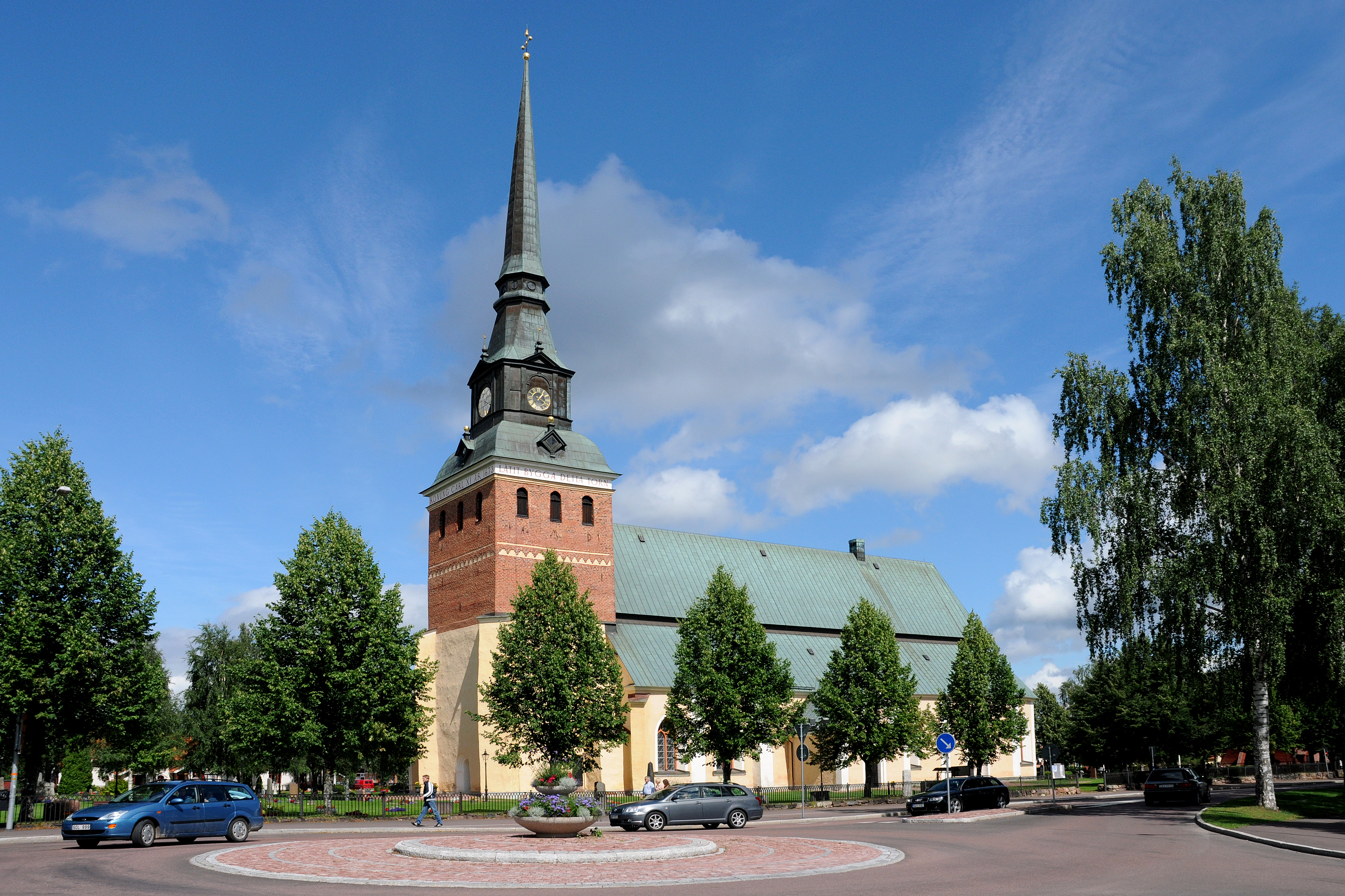
- Mora Church in October 2010
- Mora Church
- Location: Mora
- Country: Sweden
- Denomination: Church of Sweden

Administration
- Diocese: Västerås
- Parish: Mora

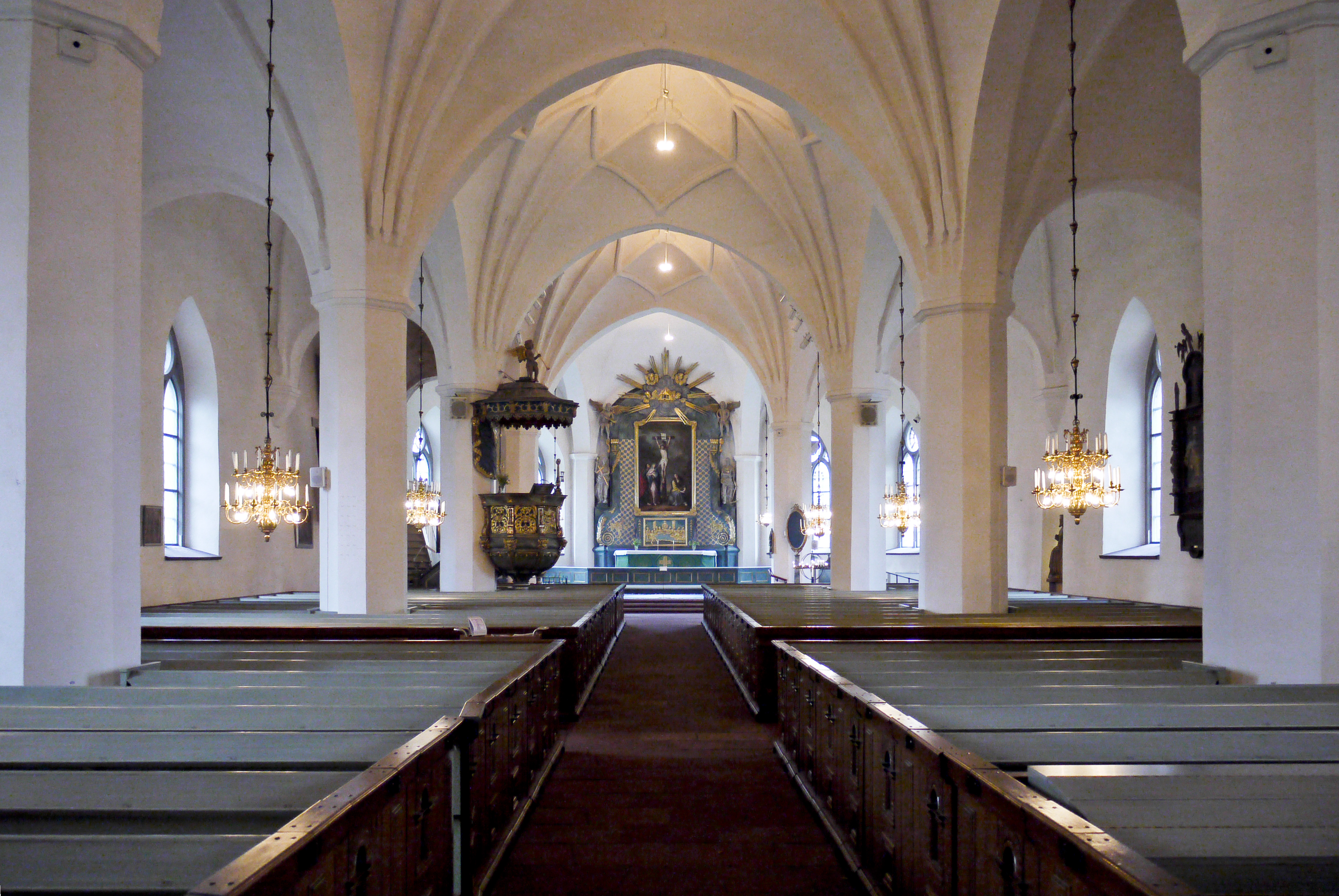
Inside Mora Church

Mora Church (Swedish: Mora kyrka) is a church building in Mora in Sweden. It belongs to Mora Parish of the Church of Sweden. It famous for being seen near the Vasaloppet finish line. The size and opulence of the church building, as compared to other churches in the region, is a result of the fact that in medieval times the whole of northern Dalarna was part of the Mora Parish and the church served as the seat of Mora Parish. The church has been dedicated to the archangel Saint Michael since before the Protestant reformation and the establishment of the Church of Sweden in the 16th century. The effigy of Michael and the dragon, as seen in the statue south-west to the churches main gates, was adopted as the coat of arms of Mora in 1946 and continues to be in use to this day. The reason why the church is dedicated to Saint Michael is a mystery, the Mora Parish itself proposes a possible miss identification with the native Scandinavian Saint Olof but nothing conclusive has been put forward as to why this would be the case.
