= Francis (band) =

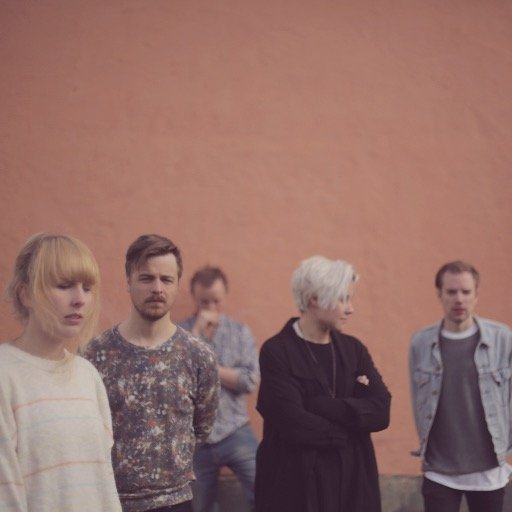

Background information
- Origin: Mora, Sweden
- Genres: folk; alternative rock
- Years active: 2006–present
- Label: Strangers Candy 2006–present
- Members: Petra Mases; Petter Nygårdh; Jerker Krumlinde; Paulina Mellkvist; Oskar Bond
- Website: francisishere.com

Francis is a Swedish folk quintet formed in Mora, Sweden in 2006 and currently based in Falun. The band consists of vocalist Petra Mases, drummer Petter Nygårdh, guitarist Jerker Krumlinde, bassist Paulina Mellkvist and keyboardist Oskar Bond. The band was originally conceived as a punk interpretation of American folk music. Francis has gained a following in the DIY community of Sweden as well as in the other Scandinavian countries and the Netherlands, where they performed at the Fabriq Festival in 2012.

== Beginnings ==
Francis has its origins in the DIY scene in Mora. During the break after their first album in 2011, released only in Sweden, the band members experienced several changes in their personal lives as well as changes in the lineup. Due to these changes, the band refrained from putting out a full album until 2016.

== 2015-Present: Marathon ==
In October 2015, Francis released their first worldwide single, Follow Me Home, to be featured on their album Marathon. The band collaborated with producer Nicolas Vernhes to create a "crisp, lucid guitar-pop" contrasting with melancholy lyrics. The song focuses on lyrics at first and then shifts focus to the instrumentals. This single met with mostly positive reviews in underground blogs, with one reviewer proclaiming them "a name to remember" and Follow Me Home a "5-minute wonder."

== Musical style and influences ==
The original founders of Francis aimed to put a punk spin on modern folk music, citing American musicians Tom Waits and Patti Smith. On the album Marathon, the band's sound evolved into a softer pop sound, and they began to focus on politics, including issues of xenophobia in Europe, as well as issues of gender equality.

== Band members ==
Vocalist Petra Mases and drummer Petter Nygårdh were part of Francis's initial makeup. The band's forthcoming Marathon will be their first recording to feature the current lineup. Mases previously worked as a composer for a short film.

== Discography ==
Albums

- Lekomberg, We Were Kin (2011)
- Marathon (2016)

EPs

- This Must Be Blood (2012)

Singles

- Follow Me Home (2015)
- "Swing" (2017)
- "Wild Heart (2018)
