= Myron Kent =

American pioneer

- Born: William Wilder Pancoast; August 27, 1844; Medina County, Ohio
- Died: June 6th, 1912 (aged 67); Bismarck, North Dakota
- Burial place: Fairview Cemetery, Bismarck, North Dakota
- Occupations: Land Developer and Businessman
- Known for: Founder of Mora, Minnesota
- Criminal charges: Murder 2nd Degree
- Criminal penalty: Death (later commuted to life in prison)
- Criminal status: Convicted
- Children: 1 Earl Kent
- Parents: Michael Pancoast (father); Mary Cook (mother)

In May 1882 Myron Kent was the first person to plat Mora, Minnesota in the United States. He was also the first postmaster, built the first building and business. Kent served on the first school board of Mora School, established in 1883. Later in life he was tried and convicted of murdering his wife Julia Laird by the state of North Dakota and was sentenced to death. After the death penalty in North Dakota was abolished his sentence was commuted to life.

== Biography ==
=== Early life ===
Kent was born as William Wilder Pancoast and lived in Ohio for his early years.

=== Marriage and children ===
Myron Kent married Julia Laird, daughter of a wealthy businessman in Pine County on New Year's Eve. 1882. They had one child together, named Earl Kent.

=== Death ===
On June 6, 1912, Myron Kent suffered a heart attack while in prison serving a life sentence and passed away.
