= Marion O'Neill =

American politician (born 1969)

Marion O'Neill Rarick
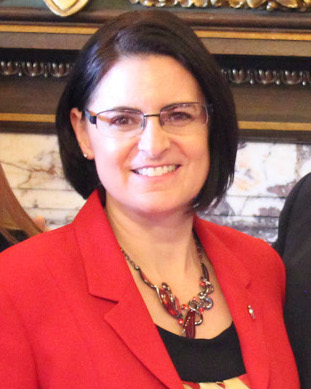
- O'Neill in 2017

Member of the Minnesota House of Representatives from the 29B district
- Incumbent
- Assumed office January 8, 2013
- Preceded by: redrawn district

Personal details
- Born: July 1, 1969 (age 57)
- Party: Republican
- Spouse: Jason Rarick (m. 2023)
- Children: 2
- Relatives: Brian Daniels (brother)
- Education: Bemidji State University (BS); Regent University (MA)

Marion O'Neill Rarick (née Daniels, born July 1, 1969) is an American politician serving in the Minnesota House of Representatives since 2013. A member of the Republican Party of Minnesota, Rarick represents District 29B in central Minnesota, which includes the cities of Buffalo and Monticello and parts of Wright County.

== Education and career ==
Rarick attended Bemidji State University, graduating with a B.S. in applied psychology, and Regent University, graduating with a M.A. in counseling. She worked in the Minnesota Senate as a legislative assistant to Senator John Howe from 2010 to 2012.

== Minnesota House of Representatives ==
Rarick was elected to the Minnesota House of Representatives in 2012, following redistricting and the retirement of Bruce Anderson, who resigned to run for the Minnesota Senate.

In 2017-18 Rarick served as an assistant majority leader for the House Republican caucus. She serves as the minority lead on the Higher Education Finance and Policy Committee and sits on the Climate and Energy Finance and Policy, Rules and Legislative Administration, and Ways and Means Committees.

== Personal life ==
Rarick married her fellow Republican state legislator, Senator Jason Rarick, in 2023, and changed her name from Marion O'Neill to Marion O'Neill Rarick. Rarick's brother Brian Daniels also serves in the Minnesota House of Representatives.

== Electoral history ==
2012 Minnesota State House - District 29B
Party	Candidate	Votes	%
Republican	Marion O'Neill	9,654	50.15
Democratic (DFL)	Barrett A. Chrissis	8,136	42.26
Independence	Eugene Newcombe	1,429	7.42
Write-in		31	0.16
Total votes		19,250	100.0
Republican hold			

2014 Minnesota State House - District 29B
Party	Candidate	Votes	%
Republican	Marion O'Neill (incumbent)	10,196	96.77
Write-in		340	3.23
Total votes		10,536	100.0
Republican hold			

2016 Minnesota State House - District 29B
Party	Candidate	Votes	%
Republican	Marion O'Neill (incumbent)	12,808	65.53
Democratic (DFL)	Steve Kilburn	6,714	34.35
Write-in		23	0.12
Total votes		19,545	100.0
Republican hold			

2018 Minnesota State House - District 29B
Party	Candidate	Votes	%
Republican	Marion O'Neill (incumbent)	10,531	62.02
Democratic (DFL)	Sharon McGinty	6,434	37.89
Write-in		16	0.09
Total votes		16,981	100.0
Republican hold			

2020 Minnesota State House - District 29B
Party	Candidate	Votes	%
Republican	Marion O'Neill (incumbent)	14,290	62.95
Democratic (DFL)	Joe Rosh	8,373	36.88
Write-in		38	0.17
Total votes		22,701	100.0
Republican hold			

2022 Minnesota State House - District 29B
Party	Candidate	Votes	%
Republican	Marion O'Neill (incumbent)	13,665	95.82
Write-in		596	4.18
Total votes		14,261	100.0
Republican hold			

== Personal life ==
Rarick has two children and six grandchildren. She resides in Maple Lake, Minnesota. Her brother, Brian Daniels, also serves in the Minnesota House of Representatives.
