= Roger Crawford (politician) =

American politician

Minnesota State Representative Roger Crawford
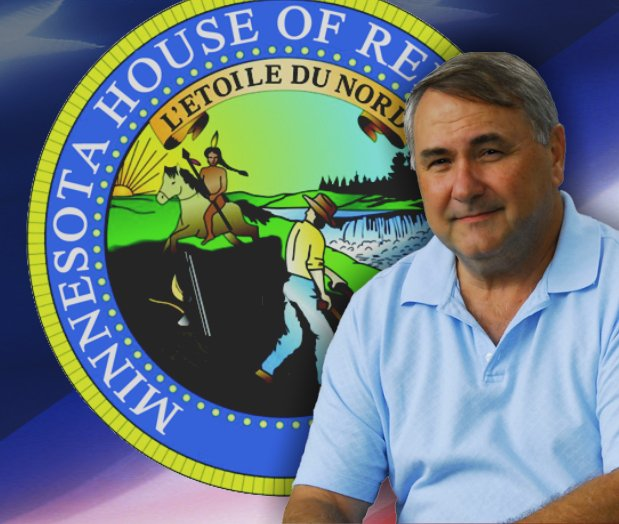

Member of the Minnesota House of Representatives from the 8B district
- In office January 4, 2011 – January 7, 2013
- Preceded by: Tim Faust
- Succeeded by: district redrawn

Personal details
- Born: June 8, 1952 (age 74) Saint Paul, Minnesota, U.S.
- Party: Republican Party of Minnesota
- Spouse: Barb
- Children: 4
- Education: St. Cloud State University
- Profession: small business owner, real estate appraiser, former educator, legislator, veteran

Roger W. Crawford (born June 8, 1952) is an American businessman and politician.

== Biography ==
Crawford was a member of the Minnesota House of Representatives who represented District 8B, which includes portions of Isanti, Kanabec and Pine counties in the east-central part of the state. A Republican, he is a real estate appraiser and small business owner. He has served as mayor of the city of Mora, MN and as a Kanabec County Commissioner. He is also a former educator and is a veteran of the United States Navy.

=== Personal life ===
Born June 8, 1952 to an elementary school teacher and a tool and die machinist. He was the youngest of 5 children. His family moved to Circle Pines, Minnesota before he started school and he spent the remainder of his childhood residing there. He attended Centennial Senior High School, where competed in football, basketball, and baseball. Married in 1972 to his wife Barbara, they have 4 grown children.

=== Education ===
After graduating from high school Roger attended St. Cloud State University in St. Cloud, Minnesota. He resumed his pursuit of a Bachelor of Arts degree in mass communications following his honorable discharge from the Navy in 1977. In the late 1980s he augmented his education by earning a Bachelor of Science degree in Elementary Education.

=== Community activities ===
Before serving as mayor of Mora from 2002 to 2006, Crawford was a member of the Mora City Council, the Mora Public Utility Commission, the East Central Regional Library Board, and the Mora Housing and Redevelopment Authority. He is a member of the American Legion Honor Guard, the NRA, the Mora Area Chamber of Commerce and the Knights of Columbus. Before his election to the Minnesota State House of Representatives, Crawford was elected and served as a Kanabec County Commissioner

=== Military service ===
Crawford served in the U.S. Navy as a journalist on the U.S.S. Oriskany from 1973 to 1977. The Oriskany was an aircraft carrier that deployed with approximately 3,500 men. As a journalist, he was responsible for putting out a daily newspaper, running the radio and television stations, anchoring the nightly news, conducting tours while in port and working on the ship's yearbook.

== Political career ==
- 1997-2002 Mora City Council
  - As a new council member in 1997, Crawford voted against closing the Mora swimming pool until a plan was in place to build a new pool. Subsequently, a plan was approved to a build a swimming pool with private and public contributions of $1 million. $200,000 was borrowed for slides and has since been paid off.
- 2002-2006 Mayor of Mora
  - Created a Mora Economic Development Authority (EDA).
  - Attempted to publish minutes from city council meetings and televise city council meetings.
  - Initiated a quarterly newsletter to citizens of Mora
- 2008-2010 Kanabec County Commissioner
  - Voted to not increase taxes in Kanabec County
  - Voted to decrease commissioner's salary by 3%
- 2010-2012 Minnesota House of Representatives, District 8B

=== Minnesota House of Representatives ===
==== Election ====
Crawford was first elected to the House in 2010 from district 8B. He defeated the incumbent, Tim Faust, by a margin of 8673 (55.92%) to 6786 (43.76%). Crawford ran on a platform of improving the Minnesota business climate, controlling spending and keeping taxes lower.

==== Committees ====
- Commerce and Regulatory Reform
- Education Reform
- Taxes committees
- Taxes Subcommittee for the Property and Local Tax Division.

==== Bills authored and co-authored ====
Bills Authored:

Bills Co-Authored:

Crawford was one of seven legislators featured in an August 2011 story in the Minneapolis Star Tribune for taking pay during Minnesota's government shutdown that summer. The paper and other media outlets had reported in June that Crawford was one of seventeen Republican House members who would not take their salary in the event of a state shutdown. Crawford said in August that his words had been misinterpreted.

"I believed it wasn't right to receive a paycheck if others were not able to work through no fault of their own," he wrote. "I haven't now changed my mind and chosen to take the pay. I have always said I was deferring pay during the shutdown but thought I should receive the pay after it ended."
