= Swedish Collegium for Advanced Study =

Swedish research institute

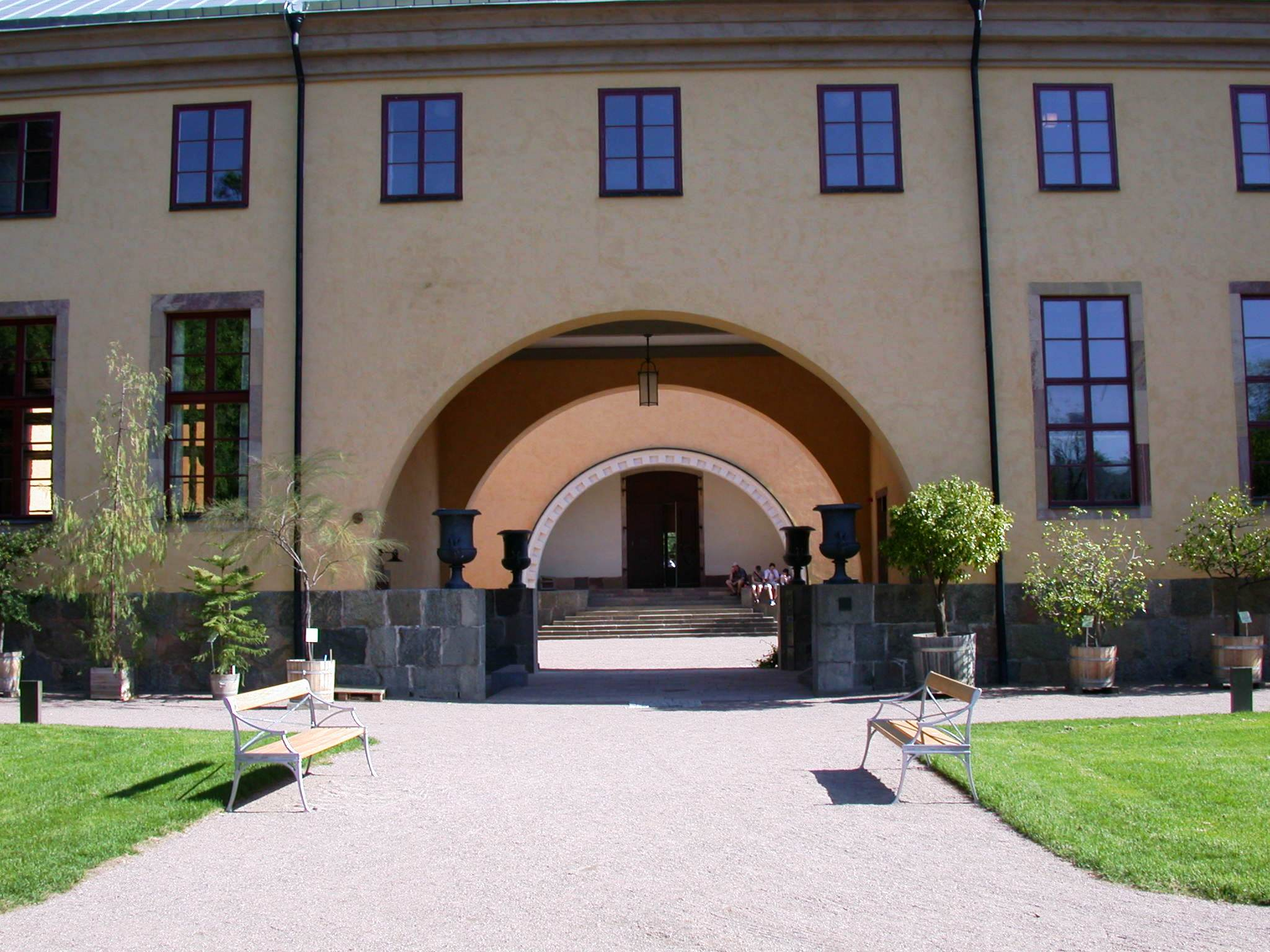
SCAS in Uppsala

The Swedish Collegium for Advanced Study (SCAS) is an institute for advanced study in Uppsala, Sweden. It is one of the ten member institutions of the Some Institutes for Advanced Study consortium, which brings together some of the world's most distinguished institutes for advanced study. SCAS is also a member of the European network of institutes for advanced study NetIAS. In 2022, SCAS was one of the founders of NordIAS, a network of Nordic institutes for advanced study.

The Swedish Collegium for Advanced Study is host to the prestigious Pro Futura Scientia Program, funded by Riksbankens Jubileumsfond.

The Collegium was founded in 1985, chartered by the Swedish government and offers one-semester and one-year fellowships to visiting scholars, as well as opportunities for short-term stays, ranging from postdoctoral to professorial positions. Since January 2007, it is located in the Linneanum and the Prefekt Villan in the Uppsala University Botanical Garden. It was earlier located in a villa in the Kåbo district of Uppsala. Since its inception in 1985, the Collegium has hosted more than 650 fellows.

Christina Garsten, Professor of Social Anthropology, is the collegium's principal, since 2018.
