= Mora Municipal Airport =

Airport in Minnesota

- IATA: none; ICAO: KJMR; FAA LID: JMR

Summary
- Airport type: Public
- Owner: City of Mora
- Serves: Mora, Minnesota
- Elevation AMSL: 1,038.2 ft / 314.8 m
- Coordinates: 45°53′30.8340″N 093°16′22.6170″W

Map
- Location of airport in Minnesota/United States KJMR (the United States)

Runways
Direction	Length		Surface
Direction	ft	m	Surface
17/35	4,794	1,461	Asphalt
11/29	3,152	961	Turf

Mora Municipal Airport (ICAO: KJMR, FAA LID: JMR) is a city-owned public-use airport located one mile north-east of the city of Mora in Kanabec County, Minnesota.

== Facilities and aircraft ==
Mora Airport covers an area of 308 acres and contains one runway designated 17/35 with a 4,794 x 75 ft (1,461 x 23 m) asphalt surface. For the 12-month period ending August 31, 2017, the airport had 11,000 aircraft operations, an average of 41 per day: 100% general aviation. At that time there were 28 aircraft based at this airport: 26 single-engine. 0 that were multi-engine, 1 jet aircraft, and 1 helicopter.

== See also ==
- List of airports in Minnesota
- List of airports in the United States
