= Gladys Nordenstrom =

American classical composer

Gladys Mercedes Nordenstrom
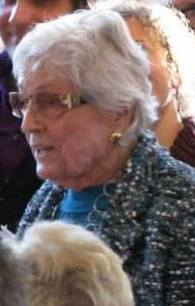
- Gladys Nordenstrom at the soundON Music Festival, San Diego (2014)
- Born: May 23, 1924; Mora, Minnesota
- Died: July 5, 2016 (aged 92); Palm Springs, California
- Occupation: composer
- Known for: Decoration of Honour for Services to the Republic of Austria
- Spouse: Ernst Krenek

Gladys Mercedes Nordenstrom (May 23, 1924 – July 5, 2016) was an American composer.

== Life ==
Gladys Nordenstrom was born in Mora, Minnesota. She studied music at the Institute of Fine Arts at Hamline University in Saint Paul, Minnesota, where she received bachelor's and master's degrees. She studied under Austrian composer Ernst Krenek there and married him in 1950. After completing her studies, Nordenstrom worked as an elementary school teacher until she moved with Krenek to California.

In the following years, she accompanied Krenek to visiting professorships in various locations and sometimes collaborated on musical works.

After Krenek died in 1991, Nordenstrom was instrumental in founding the Ernst Krenek Institute in 1998 and the private foundation Krems die Ernst Krenek in 2004 in Vienna, Austria. She expended much effort to find ways to promote performances and recordings of Krenek's music.

In 2006, Nordenstrom received the Decoration of Honour for Services to the Republic of Austria.

Nordenstrom died on July 5, 2016, in Palm Springs, California, aged 92. At the time of her death, she was at work on a project to record the complete Krenek piano concertos.

== Works ==
Selected works include:

- Theme and Variations for piano (1944)
- No Leaf Is Left for soprano and piano (1945, text by Elizabeth Coatsworth)
- First Sonata for piano (ca. 1946)
- Rondo for flute and piano (1948)
- This Life for mezzo-soprano and piano (1949, text by Rainer Maria Rilke)
- Antitheses for choir and orchestra (1966)
- El Greco Fantasy for string orchestra (1966, rev. 1969)
- Elegy in Memoriam Robert F. Kennedy for orchestra (1968)
- Sextet for flute/piccolo, oboe, clarinet in B-flat, bass clarinet, bassoon, horn (1969)
- Work for Orchestra No.3 (1974/75)
- Zeit XXIV for high voice and piano (1976, text by Renata Pandula)
- Trio for violin, clarinet, and piano (1978)
- Parabola of Light for women's choir and piano (1979)
- Signals from Nowhere for organ and tape (1981)
