= Patti Fritz =

American politician

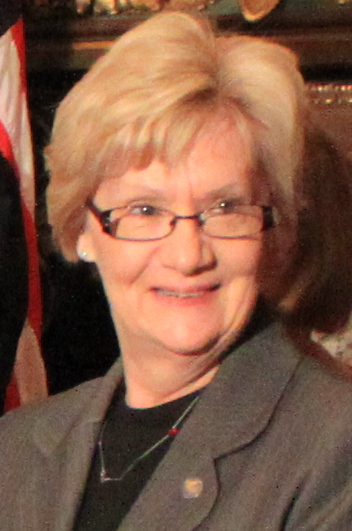

Member of the Minnesota House of Representatives from the 24B district 26B (2005–2015)
- In office January 4, 2005 – January 5, 2015
- Preceded by: Lynda Boudreau
- Succeeded by: Brian Daniels

Personal details
- Born: October 20, 1944 (age 81) Northfield, Minnesota
- Party: Minnesota Democratic–Farmer–Labor Party
- Spouse: James
- Children: 5
- Education: Faribault School of Practical Nursing
- Occupation: Licensed practical nurse

Patti Fritz (born October 20, 1944) is an American politician and former member of the Minnesota House of Representatives. A member of the Minnesota Democratic–Farmer–Labor Party (DFL), she represented District 24B, which included all or portions of Dodge, Rice, and Steele counties in the southeastern part of the state. She is a licensed practical nurse.

== Early life, education, and career ==
Fritz attended Bethlehem Academy in Faribault, then went on to the Faribault School of Practical Nursing, earning her L.P.N. designation. She has been a nurse at Saint Lucas Care Center in Faribault for over 30 years. She is a board member of Ruth's House of Hope in Faribault and of Service Employees International Union Local 113.

== Minnesota House of Representatives ==
Fritz was first elected in 2004, and was re-elected in 2006, 2008, 2010, and 2012.

Fritz was one of two Democrats in the Minnesota House to vote against a same-sex marriage bill on May 9, 2013. The bill passed 75-59.

Fritz was defeated by Brian Daniels in the 2014 election.
