= Brian Daniels (politician) =

American politician

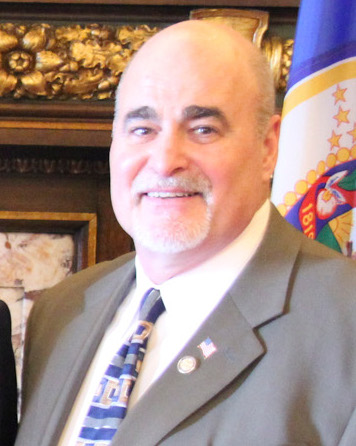

Member of the Minnesota House of Representatives from the 19A district
- In office January 6, 2015 – January 14, 2025
- Preceded by: Patti Fritz
- Succeeded by: Keith Allen

Personal details
- Born: October 2, 1958 (age 67)
- Party: Republican
- Spouse: Elizabeth
- Children: 4
- Relatives: Marion O'Neill (sister); Jason Rarick (brother-in-law)
- Education: Northwest Technical College
- Occupation: Warranty administrator; Legislator
- Website: Government website Campaign website

Brian Daniels (born October 2, 1958) is an American politician who served in the Minnesota House of Representatives from 2015 to 2025. A member of the Republican Party of Minnesota, Daniels represented District 19A south of the Twin Cities metropolitan area, including the city of Faribault and portions of Goodhue, Rice, and Waseca Counties.

== Early life, education and career ==
Daniels studied at Northwest Technical College, receiving a degree in small business management.

== Minnesota House of Representatives ==
Daniels was elected to the Minnesota House of Representatives in 2014 and was reelected every two years until 2022. He defeated five-term DFL incumbent Patti Fritz.

During the 2016 Republican presidential primary, Daniels joined two dozen state lawmakers in endorsing Senator Marco Rubio. In 2022, Daniels endorsed former state representative Brad Finstad's campaign for Minnesota's 1st congressional district.

Daniels served as the minority lead on the Children and Families Finance and Policy Committee, and also sat on the Labor and Industry Finance and Policy Committee.

Daniels sat on the Regent Candidate Advisory Council, which oversees the nomination process to the University of Minnesota Board of Regents. He was critical of lobbying efforts by PACs on behalf of regent candidates. He signed on to a letter calling on the university to stop participating in research on "aborted human fetal organs".

Daniels authored bipartisan legislation to increase access to transportation and car payment help for low-income Minnesotans. He opposed efforts to raise the gas tax and increase license tab fees to pay for transportation funding.

In September 2023, Daniels announced he would not seek reelection in 2024, after serving five terms in the Minnesota House.

== Electoral history ==
2014 Minnesota State House - District 24B
Party	Candidate	Votes	%
Republican	Brian Daniels	6,163	50.85
Democratic (DFL)	Patti Fritz (incumbent)	5,942	49.02
Write-in		16	0.13
Total votes		12,121	100.0
Republican gain from Democratic (DFL)			

2016 Minnesota State House - District 24B
Party	Candidate	Votes	%
Republican	Brian Daniels (incumbent)	10,475	58.39
Democratic (DFL)	Patti Fritz	7,441	41.47
Write-in		25	0.14
Total votes		17,941	100.0
Republican hold			

2018 Minnesota State House - District 24B
Party	Candidate	Votes	%
Republican	Brian Daniels (incumbent)	8,972	59.56
Democratic (DFL)	Yvette Marthaler	6,076	40.34
Write-in		15	0.10
Total votes		15,063	100.0
Republican hold			

2020 Minnesota State House - District 24B
Party	Candidate	Votes	%
Republican	Brian Daniels (incumbent)	12,687	66.29
Democratic (DFL)	Ashley Martinez-Perez	6,417	33.53
Write-in		34	0.18
Total votes		19,138	100.0
Republican hold			

2022 Minnesota State House - District 19A
Party	Candidate	Votes	%
Republican	Brian Daniels (incumbent)	10,614	64.91
Democratic (DFL)	Carolyn Treadway	5,724	35.00
Write-in		15	0.09
Total votes		16,353	100.0
Republican hold			

== Personal life ==
Daniels and his wife, Elizabeth, have four children and reside in Faribault, Minnesota. Daniels is partially paralyzed due to complications after treatment of a brain tumor.

His sister, Marion Rarick, also served in the Minnesota House of Representatives. Daniels and Rarick were the first brother-sister pair to serve together in the state legislature, and the first sibling pair since the early 1980s.
