= Mora clock =

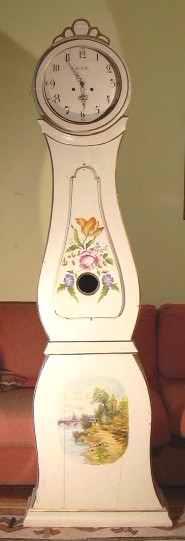
A Mora clock dating from 1834, with later painting on the case

Gustavian Mora clocks are a type of longcase clock which were made in, and derived their name from, the town of Mora in Dalarna province, Sweden. Production began in the late 18th century and continued through most of the 19th century, finally succumbing to the increased competition from newer styles and cheaper mass production methods.

== History ==
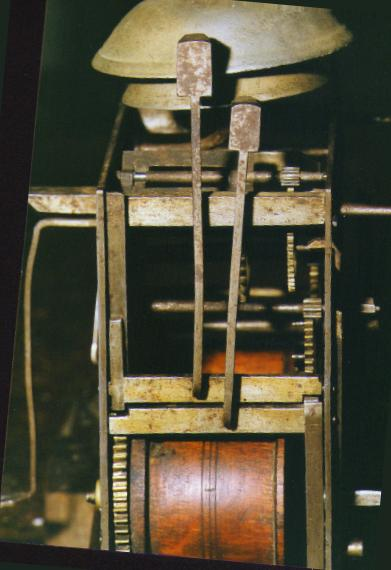
A side view of an early 19th-century Mora clock mechanism

Mora clock faces are often marked with the inscription "A A S Mora"—the initials of Krång Anders Andersson (1727-1799) of Östnor, traditionally known as the first clockmaker in the district of Mora. The discovery of his initials on a clock movement dated 1792 has been taken as evidence that the cottage clock industry was already flourishing by this time.

This cooperative manufacture of clocks in Mora arose as a source of supplemental income for the farm families of this agriculturally poor region. Each family would "specialise" by making one or more of the parts required. A finished clock would often be sold without a case—the buyer then arranging for one to be made, often locally. This helps to explain the great variety of cases that exist.

Regional differences exist within Sweden as to the styles of Mora Clocks made. The style of Mora Clocks made in the North of Sweden though featuring the same basic shape differed quite markedly from those Mora Clocks made in the South of Sweden.

Gunnar Pipping has estimated that more than 50,000 Mora clock mechanisms were made throughout the 19th century. At the peak period of their production, as many as 1,000 clocks were being made each year. Within 80 years, however, competition from inexpensive German and American clocks helped put an end to this cottage industry. Regional difference existed in the style of Mora clocks made during this period.

== Mechanism ==
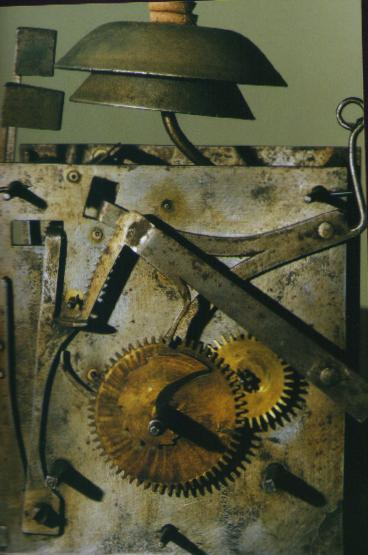
The front view of a Mora clock mechanism, minus the face

The clocks have eight-day movements and strike the hours on two bells mounted above the clock mechanism or alternatively on a spiral wire gong. The weights were made of cast iron.
