= Vasaloppet USA =

- Status: Active
- Genre: Sporting event
- Date: February
- Frequency: Annual
- Locations: Mora, Minnesota
- Country: United States
- Inaugurated: 1973
- Major events: Cross-country skiing; Skijoring; Fatbiking
- Website: vasaloppet.us

Vasaloppet USA is a cross-country skiing event held around Mora in Minnesota, USA. The first race was held in 1973, and the race is held the first Saturday each February. Prior to 2015, the race was held the second Sunday each February. The main event is 58 km (36 mi) long, and the competition is named after Vasaloppet in Sweden.

The American Vasaloppet features a 13 km (8.1 mi), 35 km (22 mi) and 58 km (36 mi) freestyle races, a 42 km (26 mi) classical race, and many other events in and around Mora, Minnesota. Even a children's Miniloppet is held, with various lengths for the races so all children, no matter what age, can compete in a shorter race.

The first place male and female racers in the 58 km freestyle race win a trip to compete in the Swedish Vasaloppet, or a thousand dollars prize money (about the equivalent of the trip and entry fee for the Swedish Vasaloppet).
