= Mora, Sweden =

Mora
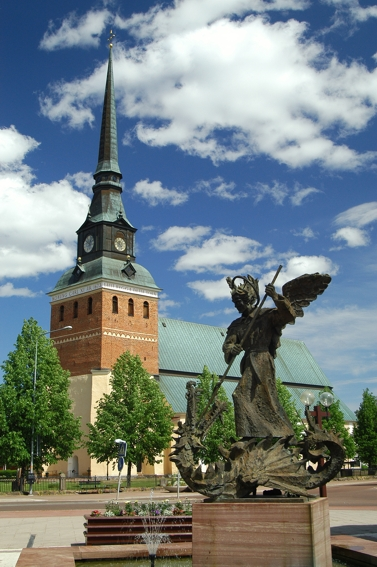
- Mora Church

- Location within Dalarna Location within Sweden
- Coordinates: 61°01′N 14°32′E
- Country: Sweden
- Province: Dalarna
- County: Dalarna County
- Municipality: Mora Municipality

Area
  - Total: 12.36 km^{2} (4.77 sq mi)
- Elevation: 155 m (509 ft)

Population (31 December 2010)
  - Total: 10,896
  - Density: 882/km^{2} (2,280/sq mi)
- Time zone: UTC+1 (CET)
  - Summer (DST): UTC+2 (CEST)
- Postal code: 792 80
- Area code: (+46) 25
- Website: www.mora.se

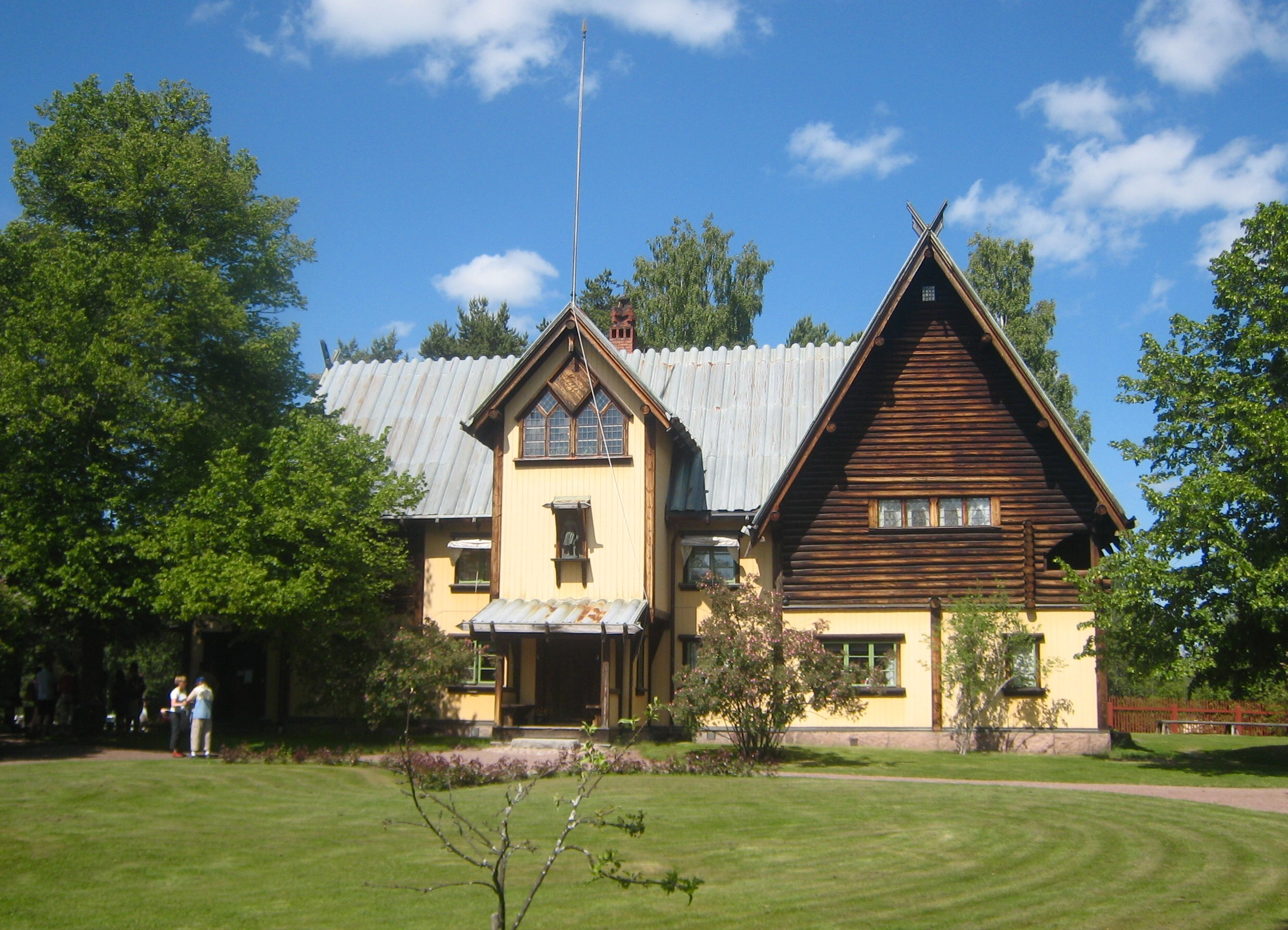
The Zorn Museum

Mora is a locality and the seat of Mora Municipality in Dalarna County, Sweden, with 10,896 inhabitants in 2010.

== History ==
There are signs of human activity in the surroundings of Mora dating from 4000 BC. The earliest found buildings in Mora are from the 7th century. Some of the buildings can today be found in Mora's open-air museum Zorns gammelgård ("Zorn's old homestead").

Mora parish was established in the 13th century.

In late 1520, Gustav Vasa stopped in Mora, in order to organize a rebellion against the Danish troops which occupied Sweden. The citizens of Mora first declined to help Vasa, but later changed their minds and sought Vasa when he was about to cross the Norwegian border. Two men from Mora (Lars Jakobsson and Engelbrekt Jonsson) caught up with Vasa in Sälen and told him their people were willing to fight for him. The rebellion managed to overthrow the Danish government in Sweden and Vasa was installed as king of Sweden.

In the 17th century, it was the location of the famous Mora witch trial.

During the 18th century the area around Mora was struck by famine, and many citizens abandoned their homes. Most went to Stockholm and southern Sweden where they learnt new craftsman skills. Returning to Mora they used their new knowledge to build up new industries. During the end of the 18th century and the 19th, cottage industries of clocks, sewing machines, knives and water taps were important to the economy. Water taps and knives are still thriving industries.

== Geography ==
Mora is located between the northern shore of lake Siljan and the southern shore of lake Orsasjön where the Österdal River enters Siljan. Mora lies on the west side of Europe's largest meteor impact crater (Siljansringen).

The northern part of the municipality marks the beginning of the Scandinavian mountain range.

== Climate ==
Mora has a cool and maritime version of the humid continental climate, where it is at the periphery of the northern zone. Non-subarctic climates in inland areas at north of the 61st parallel are very rare and can be attributed to the warming influence of the North Atlantic air masses. Being located at some distance from the four largest lakes, the Atlantic and the Baltic seas, Mora has a more continental climate than the major cities of Sweden, with relatively warm summers but with high variability between cold and milder winters. As of 2021, the mildest January was 1.9 °C (35.4 °F) in 2020 and the coldest −18.1 °C (−0.6 °F) during the record-breaking deep freeze of 1987.

Climate data for Mora (2002–2020 averages); extremes since 1941; snow depth from Orsa
Month	Jan	Feb	Mar	Apr	May	Jun	Jul	Aug	Sep	Oct	Nov	Dec	Year
Record high °C (°F)	10.5 (50.9)	11.5 (52.7)	17.3 (63.1)	26.4 (79.5)	28.0 (82.4)	32.4 (90.3)	31.7 (89.1)	33.0 (91.4)	25.4 (77.7)	21.6 (70.9)	15.1 (59.2)	10.9 (51.6)	33.0 (91.4)
Mean maximum °C (°F)	5.6 (42.1)	6.4 (43.5)	12.4 (54.3)	18.0 (64.4)	24.3 (75.7)	27.0 (80.6)	28.1 (82.6)	26.3 (79.3)	21.4 (70.5)	15.5 (59.9)	10.3 (50.5)	6.2 (43.2)	29.4 (84.9)
Mean daily maximum °C (°F)	−2.0 (28.4)	−0.7 (30.7)	4.0 (39.2)	10.4 (50.7)	15.8 (60.4)	20.1 (68.2)	22.2 (72.0)	20.3 (68.5)	15.6 (60.1)	8.4 (47.1)	3.1 (37.6)	−0.3 (31.5)	9.7 (49.5)
Daily mean °C (°F)	−5.5 (22.1)	−4.5 (23.9)	−0.8 (30.6)	4.7 (40.5)	9.9 (49.8)	14.2 (57.6)	16.5 (61.7)	15.0 (59.0)	10.9 (51.6)	4.8 (40.6)	0.3 (32.5)	−3.6 (25.5)	5.2 (41.3)
Mean daily minimum °C (°F)	−9.0 (15.8)	−8.2 (17.2)	−5.5 (22.1)	−1.0 (30.2)	3.9 (39.0)	8.3 (46.9)	10.7 (51.3)	9.7 (49.5)	6.2 (43.2)	1.1 (34.0)	−2.5 (27.5)	−6.8 (19.8)	0.6 (33.0)
Mean minimum °C (°F)	−22.9 (−9.2)	−21.9 (−7.4)	−17.3 (0.9)	−8.0 (17.6)	−3.3 (26.1)	1.8 (35.2)	4.6 (40.3)	2.1 (35.8)	−1.4 (29.5)	−7.7 (18.1)	−12.7 (9.1)	−19.4 (−2.9)	−25.8 (−14.4)
Record low °C (°F)	−39.7 (−39.5)	−40.5 (−40.9)	−30.6 (−23.1)	−22.0 (−7.6)	−8.6 (16.5)	−3.4 (25.9)	2.5 (36.5)	−2.2 (28.0)	−8.8 (16.2)	−16.6 (2.1)	−27.4 (−17.3)	−35.0 (−31.0)	−40.5 (−40.9)
Average precipitation mm (inches)	36.0 (1.42)	25.6 (1.01)	26.2 (1.03)	26.2 (1.03)	57.7 (2.27)	78.5 (3.09)	84.3 (3.32)	80.0 (3.15)	45.0 (1.77)	57.5 (2.26)	44.2 (1.74)	34.9 (1.37)	596.1 (23.46)
Average extreme snow depth cm (inches)	34 (13)	41 (16)	41 (16)	21 (8.3)	1 (0.4)	0 (0)	0 (0)	0 (0)	0 (0)	4 (1.6)	10 (3.9)	21 (8.3)	48 (19)
Source 1: SMHI Open Data
Source 2: SMHI climate data 2002–2020

== Culture ==
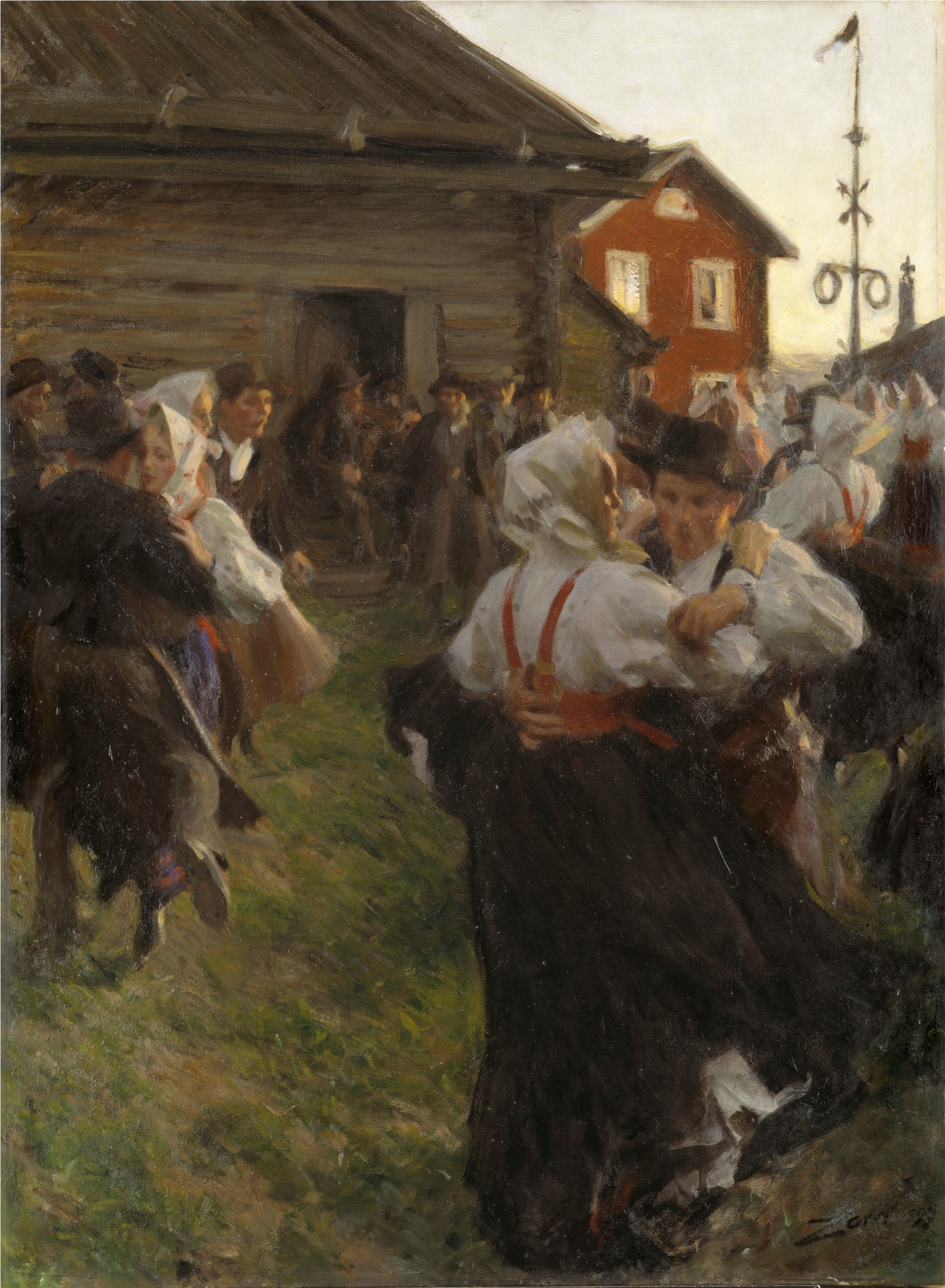
Midsummer Dance by Anders Zorn, 1897

=== Midsummer ===
As the rest of the municipalities around Lake Siljan, also in Mora, the summer solstice celebration of Midsummer plays an important role in the cultural life. People dress up in traditional folk costumes, raise maypoles, play traditional music and dance around the maypole.

=== Anders Zorn ===
The house where Swedish painter Anders Zorn lived, together with his wife Emma, is located next to the Mora Church and is open to the public. A museum containing many of his works of art has been built next door. Right outside of Mora, in the Utmeland village, is the house Zorn was born in.

=== Statues ===
A statue of King Gustav Vasa, made by Zorn, is placed on a small hill at the finishing line of Vasaloppet in Mora. Another statue depicting Zorn is located in the park behind the district court house of Mora. A third statue of a cross country skier is placed in front of the municipal house next to the town's characteristic red wooden bell tower (Swedish: Klocka).

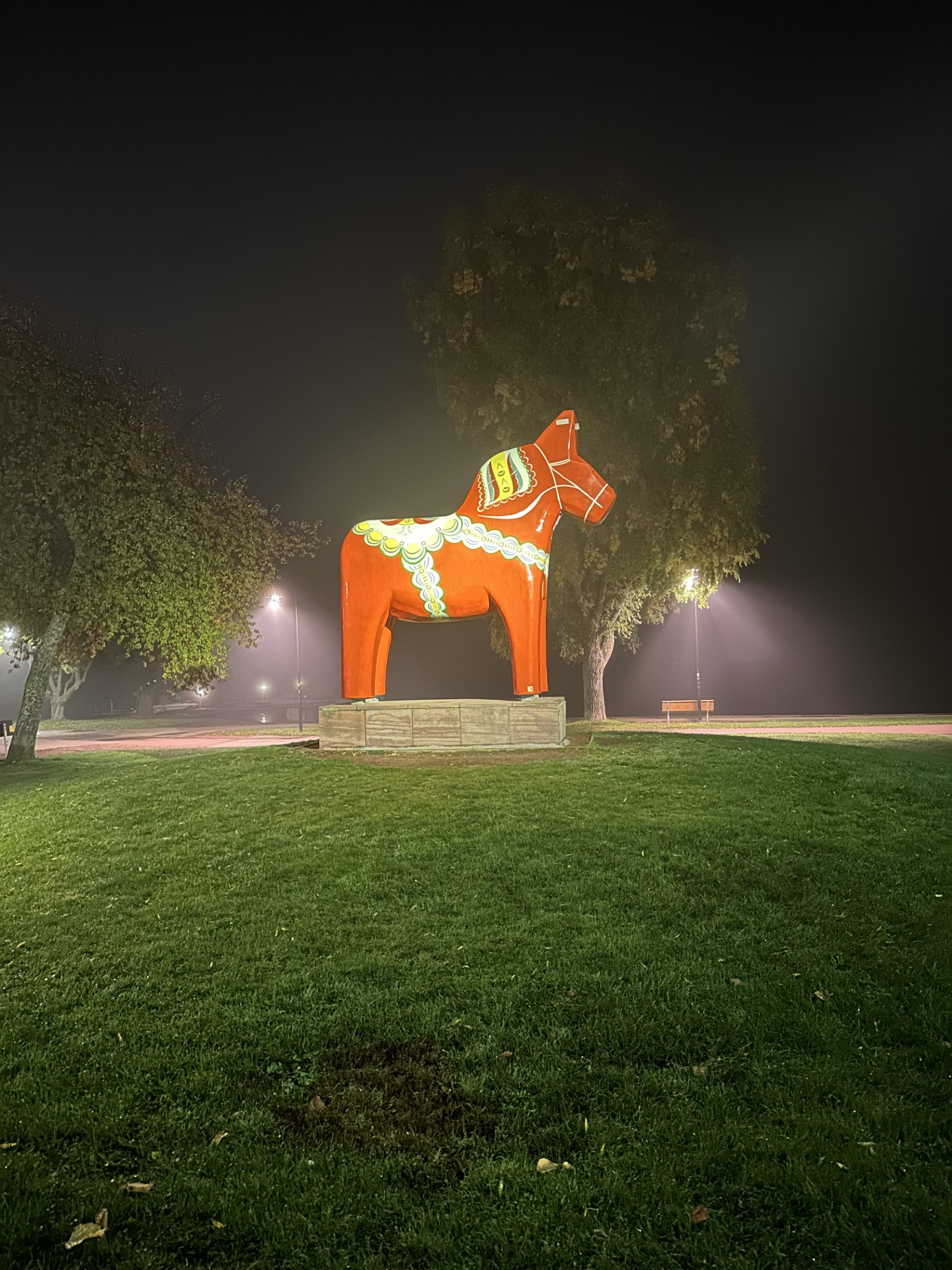
Dala horse statue in Mora, Sweden

=== Local Music ===
Mora is home to many members of Swedish folk band Francis. Mora is also where singer-songwriter Winona Oak grew up.

== Mora clock ==
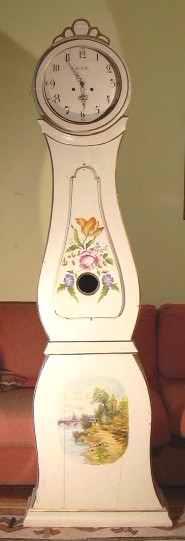
A Mora clock dating from 1834, with later painting on the case

Gustavian Mora clock are a type of longcase clock which were made in the town of Mora. Production began in the late 18th century and continued through most of the 19th finally succumbing to the increased competition from newer styles and cheaper mass production methods. Mora Fontaineece's namesake comes from the beautifully manufactured Mora clocks.

== Sports ==
=== Ice hockey ===
Mora IK plays in HockeyAllsvenskan, the second-highest Swedish ice hockey league.

=== Skiing ===
Mora is also known as the finish of the annual Vasaloppet, a 90 kilometre cross-country skiing event held in the honour of Gustav Vasa. The competition is visited by more than 48,000 annual participants in all the skiing events throughout the Vasaloppet week in the beginning of March.

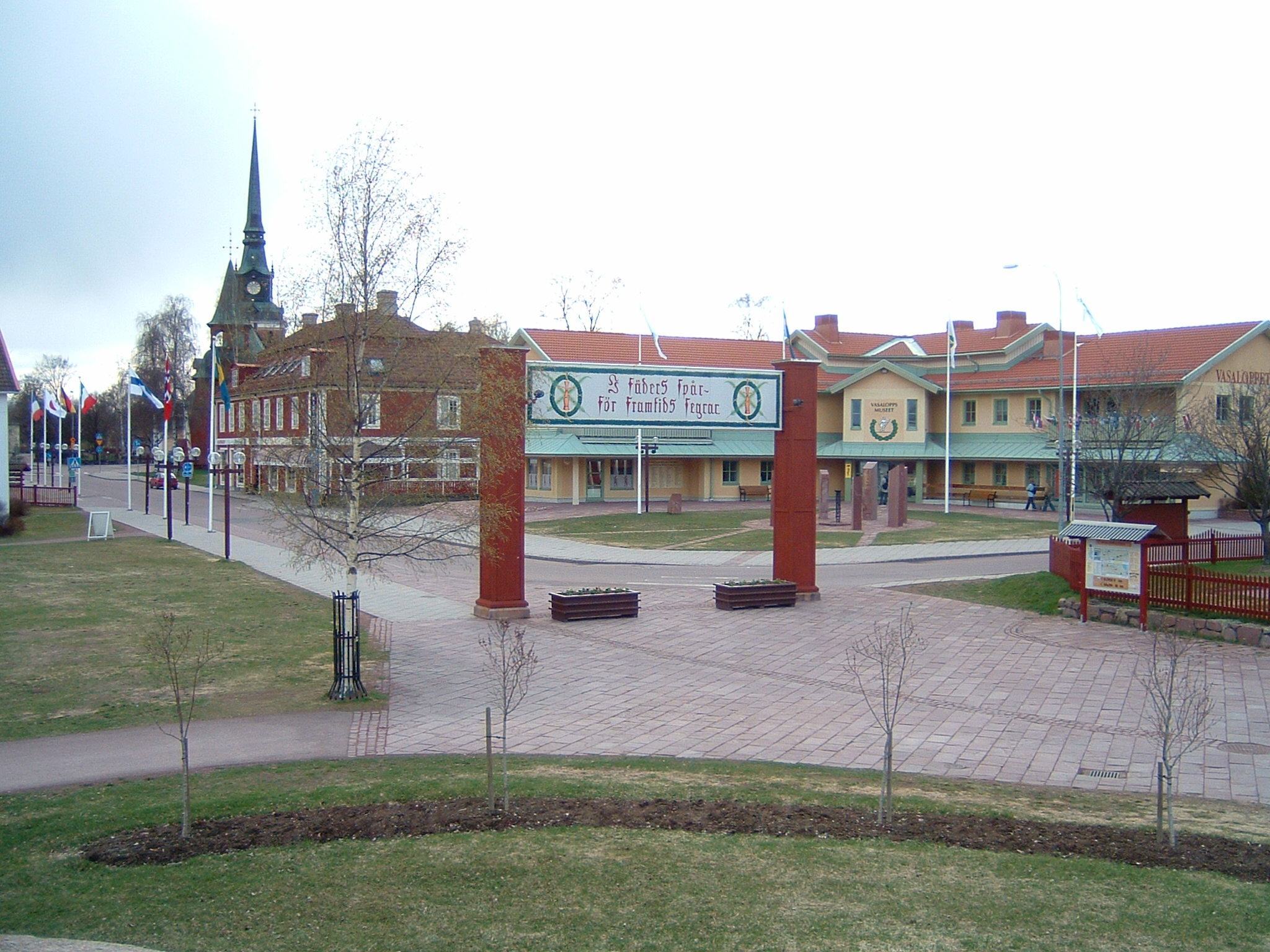
Vasaloppet finish line and museum in Mora

=== Golf ===
Mora has an 18-hole golf course located at sandängarna in Mora and an 18 hole, Jeremy Turner designed tournament length course on Sollerön. http://www.solgolf.se/

=== Cycling ===
The "Cykelvasan" is a summer version of the Vasaloppet with its start and finish in Mora. During June we also have the famous "Siljanrunt" road races, attracting top European cyclists over three stages 70, 120 and 160 km with all races commencing and finishing on Sollerön.

=== Football ===
IFK Mora FK are based in Mora.

=== Tournaments ===
Mora played host to 2007 World Junior Ice Hockey Championships, held in FM Mattsson Arena. Another sporting event is 1984 World's Strongest Man.

== Economy ==
The town of Mora is well known for its craft products. A famous Swedish souvenir, dalahäst, a wooden horse, is produced in the village Nusnäs just outside Mora.

The Mora knives are made in Mora.

Steel production company Ovako has a production site in Mora.

Mora is the terminus of the Mora-Uppsala Railway, also known as Dala Line.

== Notable people ==
- Joacim Cans (born 1970), lead singer of Power Metal band HammerFall
- Christina Garsten (born 1962), social anthropologist
- Jon Olsson (born 1982), professional freeskier and alpine ski racer
- Sven Ivar Seldinger (1921-1998) Sweden Radiologist from Mora who investigates the "Seldinger technique" for angio catheterizations.

== Notes ==
Mora as a municipality never received the title of a city (stad) before the local government reform of 1971, but as the population exceeds 10,000 the locality is today counted as a city by Statistics Sweden.

In the comic series Stand Still, Stay Silent by Minna Sundberg, Mora is featured as the capital of post-apocalyptic Sweden.
