= Tim Faust =

American politician

Member of the Minnesota House of Representatives from the 11B district 8B (2007–2011)
- In office January 8, 2013 – January 5, 2015
- Preceded by: Roger Crawford (District 8B); Bill Hilty (District 8A)
- Succeeded by: Jason Rarick
- In office January 3, 2007 – January 3, 2011
- Preceded by: Judy Soderstrom
- Succeeded by: Roger Crawford

Personal details
- Born: October 1, 1959 (age 67) Minneapolis, Minnesota
- Party: Minnesota Democratic–Farmer–Labor Party
- Children: 3
- Education: North Dakota State University
- Occupation: Pastor

Tim D. Faust (born October 1, 1959) is a Minnesota politician and former member of the Minnesota House of Representatives. A member of the Minnesota Democratic–Farmer–Labor Party (DFL), he represented District 11B, which included portions of Kanabec and Pine counties.

== Early life, education, and career ==
Faust attended the North Dakota State University, graduating with a Bachelor of Science in agricultural economics. He is the pastor of the Zion Lutheran Churches in Hinckley (Cloverdale) and Markville and a singer who has taken part in several area community-theater musicals.

== Minnesota House of Representatives ==
=== Elections ===
Faust was first elected in 2006, and reelected in 2008. He was unseated by Republican Roger Crawford in the 2010 election, but ran for the House again in 2012 and was elected. He was then unseated by Republican Jason Rarick in 2014.

2014 Minnesota State Representative- House 11B
Party	Candidate	Votes	%	±%
Democratic (DFL)	Tim Faust (Incumbent)	6488	46.15	
Republican	Jason Rarick	7545	53.67	

=== Committee assignments ===
During his first four years in the House, Faust was a member of the House Agriculture, Rural Economies and Veterans Affairs Committee, the K-12 Education Policy and Oversight Committee, and the Ways and Means Committee (of which he was vice chair). He also served on the Agriculture, Rural Economies and Veterans Affairs Subcommittee for the Veterans Affairs Division, and the Finance Subcommittee for Agriculture, Rural Economies and Veterans Affairs Finance Division.
