= Jason Rarick =

American politician

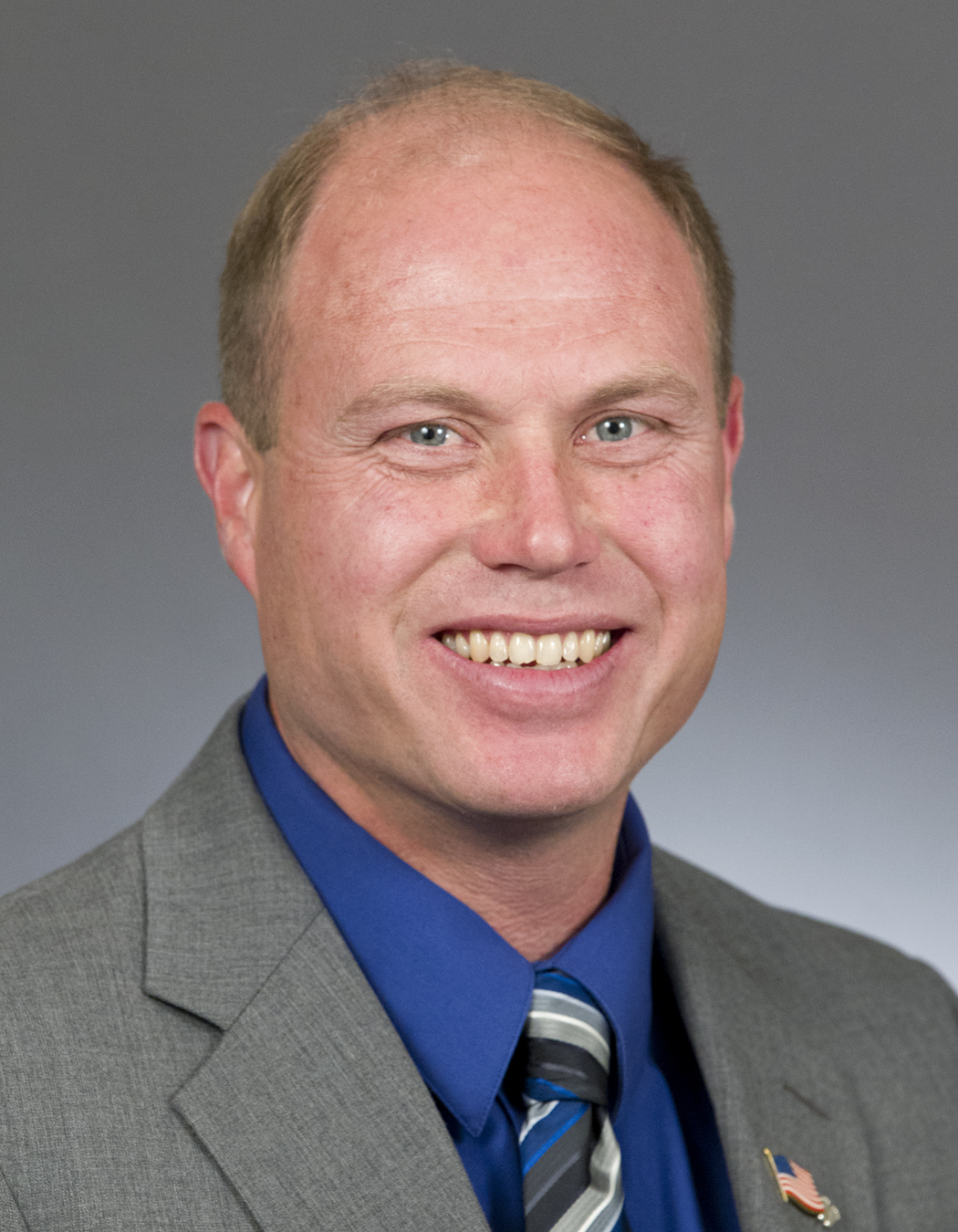

Member of the Minnesota Senate from the 11th district
- Incumbent
- Assumed office February 13, 2019
- Preceded by: Tony Lourey

Member of the Minnesota House of Representatives from the 11B district
- In office January 6, 2015 – February 12, 2019
- Preceded by: Tim Faust
- Succeeded by: Nathan Nelson

Personal details
- Born: October 21, 1969 (age 56) Pine City, Minnesota, U.S.
- Party: Republican
- Spouse: Marion O'Neill (m. 2023)
- Children: 1
- Relatives: Brian Daniels (brother-in-law)
- Education: Dunwoody College of Technology
- Occupation: electrical contractor

Jason Rarick (/ˈrærɪk/ RARR-ik; born October 21, 1969) is an American politician and a Republican member of the Minnesota Senate. He represents District 11 in east-central Minnesota. He was a member of the Minnesota House of Representatives from 2015 to 2019, representing District 11B.

== Early life, education, and career ==
Rarick was born and raised in Pine City, Minnesota. He graduated from Pine City High School in 1988. In 1990, he graduated from Dunwoody College of Technology with an Associate of Applied Science (A.A.S.) degree after completing the electrical program. In 1992, Rarick was accepted into the St. Paul electrical union, International Brotherhood of Electrical Workers Local 110. In his union he served on 3 different committees, including the apprenticeship committee for over four years. He completed his apprenticeship in 1996 and became a Master Electrician in 1997. He also taught classes for the apprenticeship program for 2 and half years. In 2004, Rarick became a self-employed electrical contractor at Rarick Electric.

== Minnesota House of Representatives ==
=== Elections ===
Rarick was elected to the Minnesota House of Representatives in 2014, defeating incumbent Tim Faust (DFL) by 7.52 percentage points (1,057 votes). He was sworn in on January 6, 2015.

2014 Minnesota State Representative- House 11B
Party	Candidate	Votes	%	±%
Republican	Jason Rarick	7,545	53.67	
Democratic (DFL)	Tim Faust (Incumbent)	6,488	46.15	

=== Committee assignments ===
In the 89th legislative session, Rarick was a part of the Agriculture Policy, Capital Investment, and Environment and Natural Resources Policy and Finance Committees.

== Minnesota Senate ==
Rarick was elected to the Minnesota Senate in a special election on February 5, 2019. He chaired the Labor and Industry Policy Committee from 2021 to 2022.

== Personal life ==
Rarick has a son, Quinn, born on October 31, 1995. Rarick has coached for local youth athletic programs, including soccer, football, basketball, and baseball, over the last 10 years. He is a lifelong member of St. Joseph's Catholic Church in Beroun, Minnesota. He grew up being an altar server and a lector, and is still a lector and a trustee. He has also been a member of the Knights of Columbus for 25 years. Rarick enjoys deer hunting, turkey hunting, camping, canoeing, watching sports, and snowmobiling.

Rarick married fellow Republican state legislator Marion O'Neill in 2023.

Minnesota House of Representatives
Preceded by Tim Faust	Member of the House of Representatives for District 11B; 2015–2019	Vacant
Minnesota Senate
Preceded by Tony Lourey	Senator for District 11; 2019–present	Incumbent
