= Clover Township, Pine County, Minnesota =

Clover Township, Minnesota
- Township
- Location within the state of Minnesota Clover Township, Minnesota (the United States)
- Coordinates: 46°0′56″N 92°37′12″W
- Country: United States
- State: Minnesota
- County: Pine

Area
  - Total: 36.1 sq mi (93.6 km^{2})
  - Land: 35.9 sq mi (93.1 km^{2})
  - Water: 0.19 sq mi (0.5 km^{2})
- Elevation: 971 ft (296 m)

Population (2000)
  - Total: 316
  - Density: 8.8/sq mi (3.4/km^{2})
- Time zone: UTC-6 (Central (CST))
  - Summer (DST): UTC-5 (CDT)
- FIPS code: 27-12268
- GNIS feature ID: 0663837

Clover Township is a township in Pine County, Minnesota, United States. The population was 316 at the 2000 census.

Clover Township was named for the red clover and white clover within its borders.

== Geography ==
According to the United States Census Bureau, the township has a total area of 36.1 square miles (93 km^{2}), of which 35.9 square miles (93 km^{2}) is land and 0.2 square miles (0.52 km^{2}) (0.55%) is water.

== Demographics ==
As of the census of 2000, there were 316 people, 123 households, and 95 families residing in the township. The population density was 8.8 inhabitants per square mile (3.4/km^{2}). There were 1,281 housing units at an average density of 35.6 per square mile (13.7/km^{2}). The racial makeup of the township was 91.77% White, 0.32% African American, 1.90% Native American, 3.80% from other races, and 2.22% from two or more races. Hispanic or Latino of any race were 4.75% of the population.

There were 123 households, out of which 27.6% had children under the age of 18 living with them, 69.9% were married couples living together, 4.1% had a female householder with no husband present, and 22.0% were non-families. 17.1% of all households were made up of individuals, and 5.7% had someone living alone who was 65 years of age or older. The average household size was 2.57 and the average family size was 2.92.

In the township the population was spread out, with 23.7% under the age of 18, 4.7% from 18 to 24, 20.6% from 25 to 44, 34.5% from 45 to 64, and 16.5% who were 65 years of age or older. The median age was 46 years. For every 100 females, there were 101.3 males. For every 100 females age 18 and over, there were 100.8 males.

The median income for a household in the township was $56,250, and the median income for a family was $58,125. Males had a median income of $24,000 versus $21,500 for females. The per capita income for the township was $22,043. About 4.0% of families and 9.1% of the population were below the poverty line, including 19.8% of those under the age of 18 and 2.9% of those 65 and older.
