= Geist (disambiguation) =

Geist ("spirit") is a German word used in philosophy, particularly by Hegel.

Geist may also refer to:

== Arts, entertainment and media ==
- Geist (DC Comics), a superhero appearing in Detective Comics
- Geist (Marvel Comics), a supervillain opponent of Wolverine
- Geist (magazine), a Canadian literary magazine
- Geist (video game), a Nintendo GameCube video game exclusively published by Nintendo
- Geist: The Sin-Eaters, a role-playing game published by White Wolf, Inc., involving undead creatures such as ghosts and heists
- Geist (album), a 2018 album by The Browning
- Geist, a 2021 album by Shannon Lay

== Other uses ==
- Geist (liquor), a distilled beverage similar to fruit brandy
- Geist (surname)
- Geist, Indianapolis, an area in northeastern Indianapolis, Indiana, United States, named after Geist Reservoir, which it surrounds
- Geist, the German name for Apața Commune, Braşov County, Romania
- Geist (restaurant) restaurant in an NRHP blacksmith building in Nashville Tennessee
- Mount Geist, a mountain in Alaska

== See also ==
- Geister (disambiguation)
