= 2012 United States presidential election in Minnesota =

- November 6, 2012
- Turnout: 76.42% (▼1.69 pp)

Nominee	Barack Obama	Mitt Romney
Party	Democratic (DFL)	Republican
Home state	Illinois	Massachusetts
Running mate	Joe Biden	Paul Ryan
Electoral vote	10	0
Popular vote	1,546,167	1,320,225
Percentage	52.65%	44.96%

Obama
40–50%
50–60%
60–70%
70–80%
80–90%
90–100%
Romney
40–50%
50–60%
60–70%
70–80%
80–90%
90–100%
Tie/No Data
President before election
Barack Obama
Democratic (DFL)
Elected President
Barack Obama
Democratic (DFL)

The 2012 United States presidential election in Minnesota took place on November 6, 2012, as part of the 2012 United States presidential election in which all 50 states plus the District of Columbia participated. State voters chose ten electors to represent them in the Electoral College via a popular vote pitting incumbent DFL President Barack Obama and his running mate, Vice President Joe Biden, against Republican challenger and former Massachusetts Governor Mitt Romney and his running mate, Congressman Paul Ryan.

Minnesota backed Obama for re-election, giving him 52.65% of the vote, while Republican challenger Mitt Romney took 44.96%, a victory margin of 7.69%. With ten Democratic wins in a row, Minnesota has the longest current streak of voting for the Democratic candidate in presidential elections of any state, having not voted Republican since Richard Nixon in 1972. This is the longest streak for the Democrats in history amongst non-Southern states.

However, Romney was able to significantly improve on McCain's performance in Minnesota, as he did nationally. Fourteen counties that voted for Obama in 2008 flipped and voted for the Republican Party in 2012, while many Democratic counties had a margin of victory much narrower than in 2008. Big Stone County voted Republican for the first time since 1980, and Pine County since 1972. Obama thus became the first Democrat to win the White House without carrying Big Stone County since Grover Cleveland in 1892. Obama also became the first ever Democrat to win the White House without carrying Red Lake County, as well as the first to do so without carrying Lincoln, Marshall, Pennington, or Polk Counties since Woodrow Wilson in 1912, the first to do so without carrying Grant or Pine Counties since Woodrow Wilson in 1916.

As of the 2024 presidential election, this is the last time the Democratic candidate won the following counties: Beltrami, Chippewa, Fillmore, Freeborn, Houston, Itasca, Kittson, Koochiching, Lac qui Parle, Mahnomen, Mower, Norman, Rice, Swift, and Traverse, or won a majority of congressional districts in the state.

== Caucuses ==
=== Democratic caucuses ===
2012 Minnesota Democratic presidential caucus
- February 7, 2012
Candidate	Barack Obama
Home state	Illinois
Delegate count	91
Popular vote	16,733
Percentage	96.3%
- County results Barack Obama No votes

2012 Minnesota Democratic caucus
Candidate	Votes	Percentage	Delegates
Barack Obama (incumbent)	16,733	96.30%	91
Uncommitted	643	3.70%	0

=== Republican caucuses ===
2012 Minnesota Republican presidential caucus
- February 7, 2012
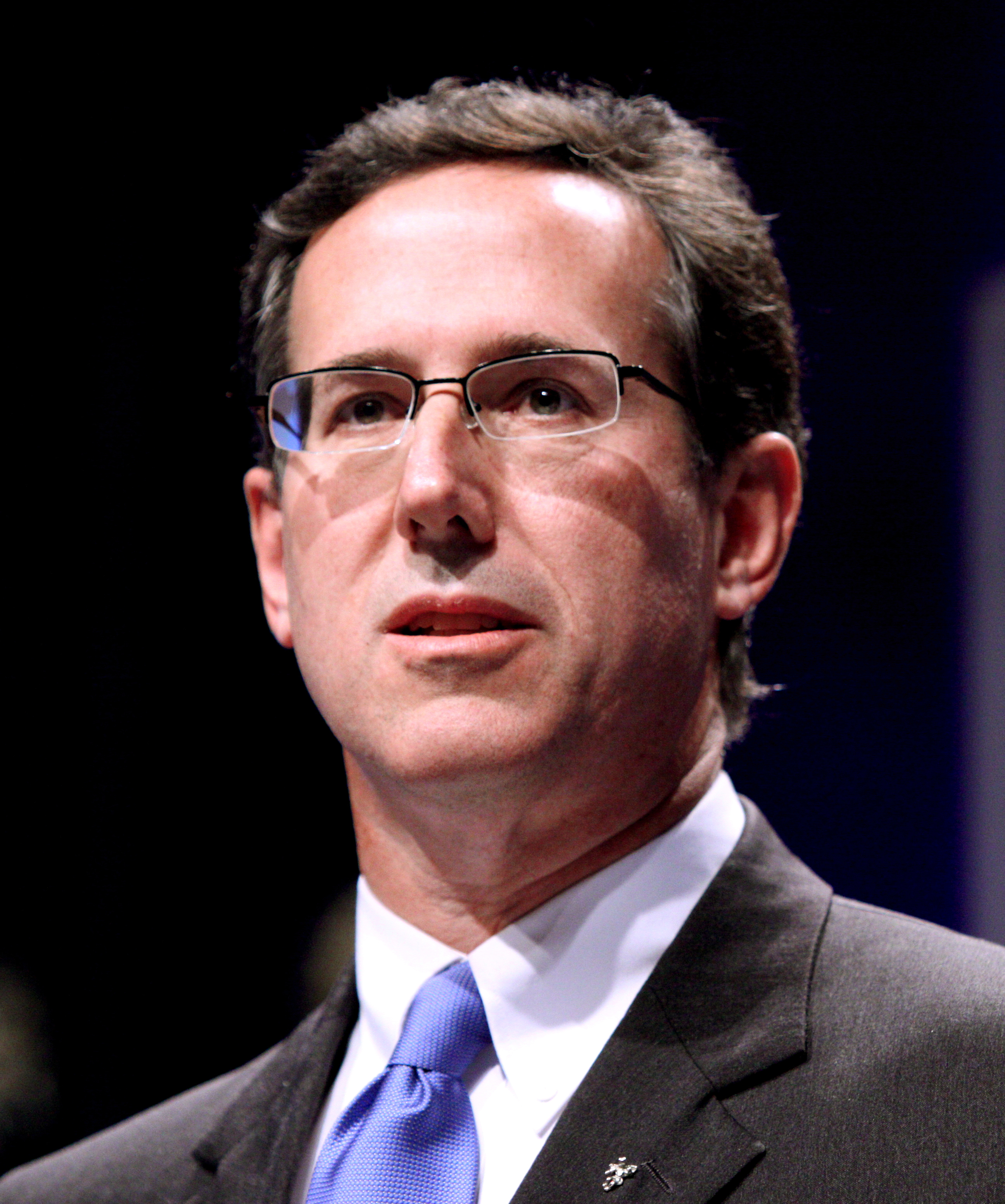

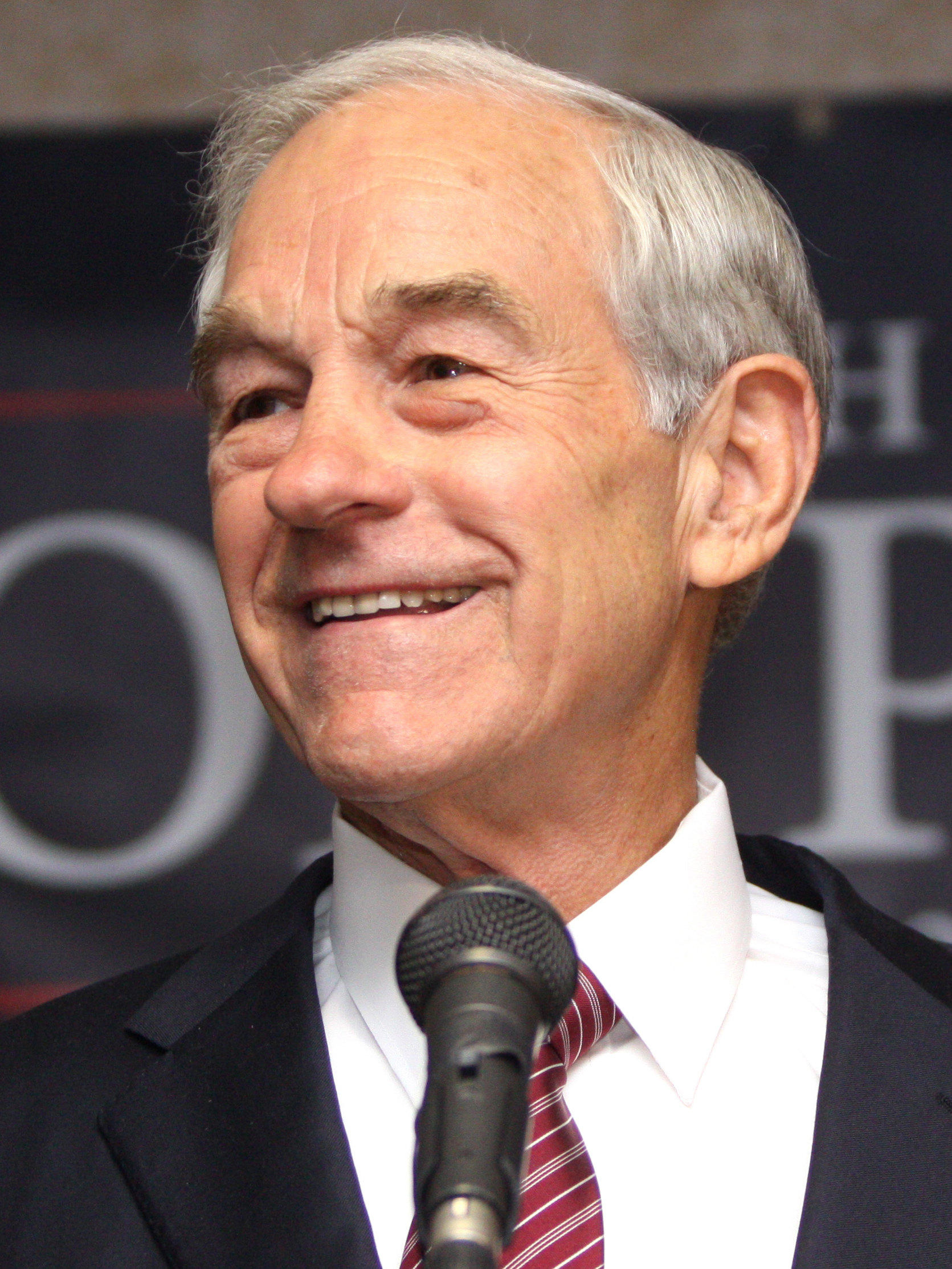

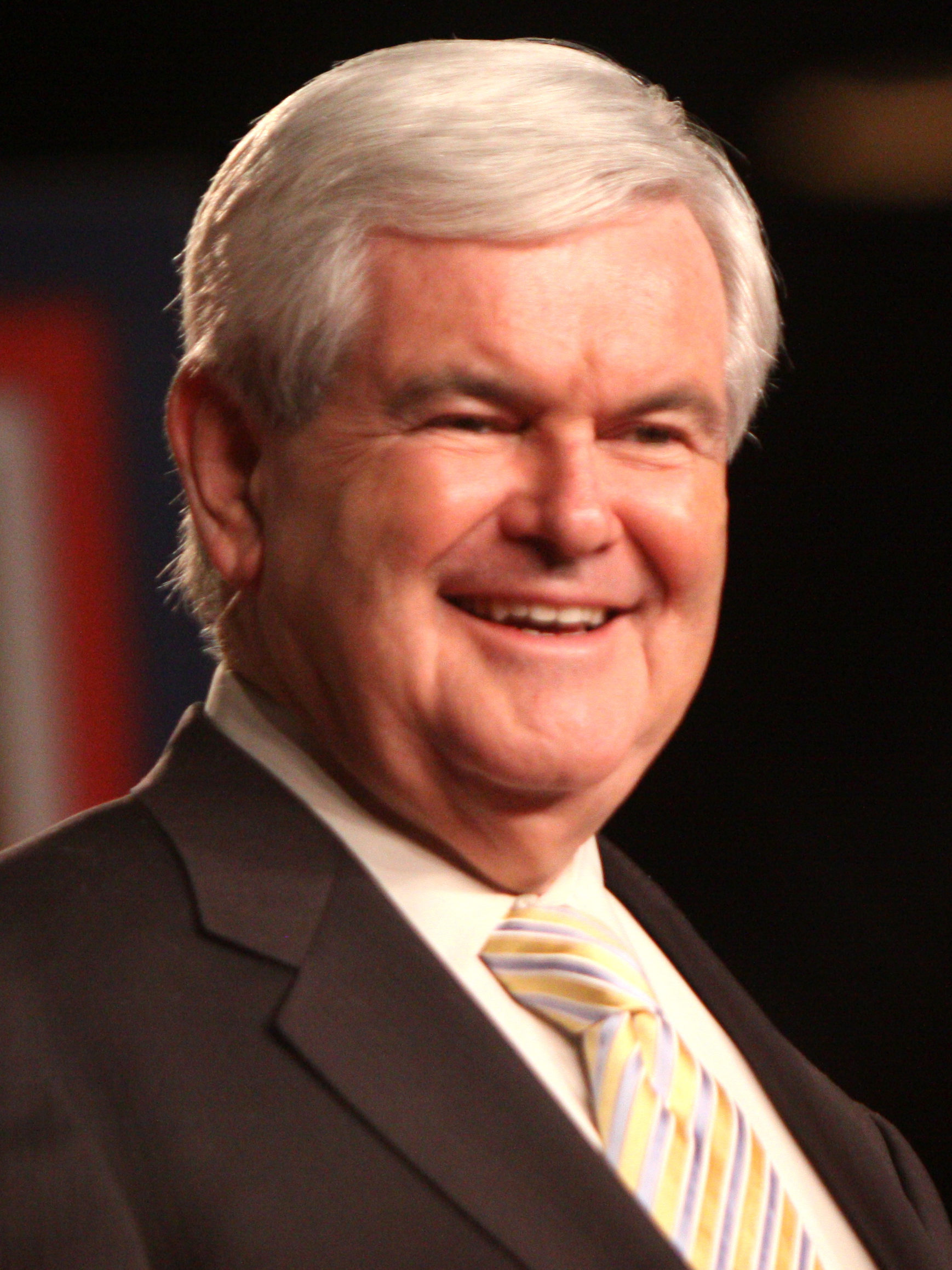
Candidate	Rick Santorum	Ron Paul
Home state	Pennsylvania	Texas
Popular vote	21,988	13,282
Percentage	44.95%	27.15%
Candidate	Mitt Romney	Newt Gingrich
Home state	Massachusetts	Georgia
Popular vote	8,240	5,263
Percentage	16.85%	10.76%
- County results Santorum: 30–40% 40–50% 50–60% 60–70% 70–80% 80–90% Paul: 30–40% 50–60% Tie: 30–40%

The Republican caucuses were held on February 7, 2012. The events coincided with the Colorado Republican caucuses as well as the Missouri Republican primary. Minnesota has a total of 40 delegates, 37 of which are tied to the caucuses while 3 are unpledged RNC delegates. The non-binding straw poll was won by Rick Santorum, but Ron Paul won 32 of the 40 delegates to the Republican National Convention.

Election Reporting
Candidate	Votes		Delegates	
Candidate	Total	Percentage	Total	Percentage
Rick Santorum	21,988	44.95%	2	5%
Ron Paul	13,282	27.15%	32	80%
Mitt Romney	8,240	16.85%	1	2.5%
Newt Gingrich	5,263	10.76%	0	0%
Write-in	143	0.29%	0	0%
Unpledged delegates:			5	12.5%
Total:	48,916	100.0%	40	100.0%

==== Conventions ====
There is no formal system of allocating delegates to candidates in any step of the election process. At each meeting the participants decides what the best course of action is. The state convention can vote to bind the 13 at-large delegates to a candidate. The 24 delegates elected at the CD conventions and the 3 automatic (RNC) delegates are not legally bound to vote for a candidate.

- 17 February - 31 March: BPOU conventions elect delegates to the state convention and the congressional district conventions.
- 14–21 April: Eight congressional conventions elect 3 National Convention delegates each.
- 18–19 May: State convention elect 13 National Convention delegates.

Convention Results
Candidate	1st	2nd	3rd	4th	5th	6th	7th	8th	State	Party leaders	Total
Ron Paul	2	3	3	3	3	3	1	2	12	0	32
Rick Santorum	0	0	0	0	0	0	2	0	0	0	2
Mitt Romney	0	0	0	0	0	0	0	0	1	0	1
Unknown	1							1		3	5
Total	24								13	3	40

== General election ==
=== Predictions ===
Source	Ranking	As of
Huffington Post	Safe D	November 6, 2012
CNN	Safe D	November 6, 2012
New York Times	Safe D	November 6, 2012
Washington Post	Safe D	November 6, 2012
RealClearPolitics	Lean D	November 6, 2012
Sabato's Crystal Ball	Likely D	November 5, 2012
FiveThirtyEight	Solid D	November 6, 2012

=== Results ===
2012 United States presidential election in Minnesota
Party	Candidate	Running mate	Votes	Percentage	Electoral votes
Democratic (DFL)	Barack Obama (incumbent)	Joe Biden (incumbent)	1,546,167	52.65%	10
Republican	Mitt Romney	Paul Ryan	1,320,225	44.96%	0
Libertarian	Gary Johnson	Jim Gray	35,098	1.20%	0
Green	Jill Stein	Cheri Honkala	13,023	0.44%	0
Constitution	Virgil Goode	Jim Clymer	3,722	0.13%	0
Grassroots	Jim Carlson	George McMahon	3,149	0.11%	0
Justice	Rocky Anderson	Luis J. Rodriguez	1,996	0.07%	0
Constitutional Government	Dean Morstad	Josh Franke-Hyland	1,092	0.04%	0
Socialist Workers	James Harris	Maura DeLuca	1,051	0.04%	0
Socialism and Liberation	Peta Lindsay	Yari Osorio	397	0.01%	0
Write-Ins			10,641	0.36%	0
Totals			2,936,561	100.00%	10
Voter turnout (eligible voters)					75.74%

==== By county ====
County	Barack Obama DFL		Mitt Romney Republican		Various candidates Other parties		Margin		Total votes cast
County	#	%	#	%	#	%	#	%	Total votes cast
Aitkin	4,412	48.26%	4,533	49.58%	197	2.16%	-121	-1.32%	9,142
Anoka	88,614	47.52%	93,430	50.11%	4,421	2.37%	-4,816	-2.59%	186,465
Becker	6,829	41.69%	9,204	56.18%	349	2.13%	-2,375	-14.49%	16,382
Beltrami	11,818	53.59%	9,637	43.70%	596	2.71%	2,181	9.89%	22,051
Benton	8,173	41.66%	10,849	55.30%	597	3.04%	-2,676	-13.64%	19,619
Big Stone	1,345	48.23%	1,385	49.66%	59	2.11%	-40	-1.43%	2,789
Blue Earth	18,164	53.00%	14,916	43.52%	1,194	3.48%	3,248	9.48%	34,274
Brown	5,630	40.42%	7,938	56.99%	361	2.59%	-2,308	-16.57%	13,929
Carlton	11,389	61.78%	6,586	35.72%	461	2.50%	4,803	26.06%	18,436
Carver	20,745	39.22%	31,155	58.90%	999	1.88%	-10,410	-19.68%	52,899
Cass	6,858	42.49%	8,957	55.49%	326	2.02%	-2,099	-13.00%	16,141
Chippewa	3,083	49.72%	2,967	47.85%	151	2.43%	116	1.87%	6,201
Chisago	12,524	42.54%	16,227	55.12%	690	2.34%	-3,703	-12.58%	29,441
Clay	15,208	52.65%	12,920	44.73%	758	2.62%	2,288	7.92%	28,886
Clearwater	1,753	41.77%	2,359	56.21%	85	2.02%	-606	-14.44%	4,197
Cook	1,993	59.99%	1,221	36.75%	108	3.26%	772	23.24%	3,322
Cottonwood	2,433	41.50%	3,316	56.57%	113	1.93%	-883	-15.07%	5,862
Crow Wing	14,760	42.27%	19,415	55.60%	745	2.13%	-4,655	-13.33%	34,920
Dakota	116,255	50.37%	109,516	47.45%	5,050	2.18%	6,739	2.92%	230,821
Dodge	4,487	43.45%	5,522	53.47%	318	3.08%	-1,035	-10.02%	10,327
Douglas	8,653	41.30%	11,884	56.72%	416	1.98%	-3,231	-15.42%	20,953
Faribault	3,407	44.17%	4,104	53.21%	202	2.62%	-697	-9.04%	7,713
Fillmore	5,713	52.45%	4,913	45.11%	266	2.44%	800	7.34%	10,892
Freeborn	9,326	55.82%	6,969	41.72%	411	2.46%	2,357	14.10%	16,706
Goodhue	12,212	47.33%	12,986	50.33%	603	2.34%	-774	-3.00%	25,801
Grant	1,647	47.23%	1,748	50.13%	92	2.64%	-101	-2.90%	3,487
Hennepin	423,982	62.34%	240,073	35.30%	16,010	2.36%	183,909	27.04%	680,065
Houston	5,281	50.56%	4,951	47.40%	214	2.04%	330	3.16%	10,446
Hubbard	4,676	40.59%	6,622	57.48%	222	1.93%	-1,946	-16.89%	11,520
Isanti	8,024	39.69%	11,675	57.75%	518	2.56%	-3,651	-18.06%	20,217
Itasca	12,852	53.73%	10,501	43.90%	566	2.37%	2,351	9.83%	23,919
Jackson	2,268	41.77%	3,044	56.06%	118	2.17%	-776	-14.29%	5,430
Kanabec	3,593	44.09%	4,328	53.10%	229	2.81%	-735	-9.01%	8,150
Kandiyohi	9,805	45.68%	11,240	52.36%	420	1.96%	-1,435	-6.68%	21,465
Kittson	1,241	51.28%	1,095	45.25%	84	3.47%	146	6.03%	2,420
Koochiching	3,451	53.44%	2,841	43.99%	166	2.57%	610	9.45%	6,458
Lac qui Parle	1,974	49.55%	1,938	48.64%	72	1.81%	36	0.91%	3,984
Lake	4,043	59.28%	2,610	38.27%	167	2.45%	1,433	21.01%	6,820
Lake of the Woods	859	38.45%	1,306	58.46%	69	3.09%	-447	-20.01%	2,234
Le Sueur	6,753	45.64%	7,715	52.15%	327	2.21%	-962	-6.51%	14,795
Lincoln	1,429	45.80%	1,595	51.12%	96	3.08%	-166	-5.32%	3,120
Lyon	5,465	44.12%	6,594	53.23%	329	2.65%	-1,129	-9.11%	12,388
Mahnomen	1,276	58.48%	871	39.92%	35	1.60%	405	18.56%	2,182
Marshall	1,998	42.53%	2,569	54.68%	131	2.79%	-571	-12.15%	4,698
Martin	4,054	36.96%	6,657	60.69%	257	2.35%	-2,603	-23.73%	10,968
McLeod	6,968	37.56%	11,069	59.66%	516	2.78%	-4,101	-22.10%	18,553
Meeker	4,969	40.68%	6,913	56.60%	332	2.72%	-1,944	-15.92%	12,214
Mille Lacs	5,829	44.53%	6,951	53.10%	311	2.37%	-1,122	-8.57%	13,091
Morrison	6,153	36.81%	10,159	60.78%	402	2.41%	-4,006	-23.97%	16,714
Mower	11,129	60.03%	6,938	37.42%	472	2.55%	4,191	22.61%	18,539
Murray	2,160	45.31%	2,504	52.53%	103	2.16%	-344	-7.22%	4,767
Nicollet	9,652	52.58%	8,214	44.75%	491	2.67%	1,438	7.83%	18,357
Nobles	3,793	44.52%	4,581	53.77%	146	1.71%	-788	-9.25%	8,520
Norman	1,730	53.94%	1,384	43.16%	93	2.90%	346	10.78%	3,207
Olmsted	39,338	50.23%	36,832	47.03%	2,146	2.74%	2,506	3.20%	78,316
Otter Tail	12,165	38.41%	18,860	59.55%	645	2.04%	-6,695	-21.14%	31,670
Pennington	3,024	46.40%	3,305	50.71%	188	2.89%	-281	-4.31%	6,517
Pine	6,750	48.34%	6,845	49.02%	370	2.64%	-95	-0.68%	13,965
Pipestone	1,725	37.13%	2,826	60.83%	95	2.04%	-1,101	-23.70%	4,646
Polk	6,773	46.10%	7,615	51.83%	305	2.07%	-842	-5.73%	14,693
Pope	2,981	47.73%	3,142	50.30%	123	1.97%	-161	-2.57%	6,246
Ramsey	184,938	66.33%	86,800	31.13%	7,084	2.54%	98,138	35.20%	278,822
Red Lake	928	46.99%	978	49.52%	69	3.49%	-50	-2.53%	1,975
Redwood	3,008	38.61%	4,570	58.66%	212	2.73%	-1,562	-20.05%	7,790
Renville	3,394	44.02%	4,149	53.81%	167	2.17%	-755	-9.79%	7,710
Rice	17,054	52.85%	14,384	44.58%	829	2.57%	2,670	8.27%	32,267
Rock	1,946	40.16%	2,810	57.99%	90	1.85%	-864	-17.83%	4,846
Roseau	2,772	37.70%	4,409	59.97%	171	2.33%	-1,637	-22.27%	7,352
St. Louis	73,378	63.48%	39,131	33.85%	3,085	2.67%	34,247	29.63%	115,594
Scott	29,712	41.47%	40,323	56.28%	1,612	2.25%	-10,611	-14.81%	71,647
Sherburne	17,597	37.84%	27,848	59.88%	1,064	2.28%	-10,251	-22.04%	46,509
Sibley	2,916	37.31%	4,693	60.05%	206	2.64%	-1,777	-22.74%	7,815
Stearns	33,551	42.75%	43,015	54.81%	1,911	2.44%	-9,464	-12.06%	78,477
Steele	8,706	45.52%	9,903	51.78%	515	2.70%	-1,197	-6.26%	19,124
Stevens	2,742	48.51%	2,766	48.94%	144	2.55%	-24	-0.43%	5,652
Swift	2,751	53.74%	2,248	43.91%	120	2.35%	503	9.83%	5,119
Todd	4,819	40.83%	6,719	56.93%	265	2.24%	-1,900	-16.10%	11,803
Traverse	943	51.06%	861	46.62%	43	2.32%	82	4.44%	1,847
Wabasha	5,415	46.03%	6,049	51.42%	299	2.55%	-634	-5.39%	11,763
Wadena	2,492	36.70%	4,143	61.01%	156	2.29%	-1,651	-24.31%	6,791
Waseca	4,370	44.83%	5,116	52.49%	261	2.68%	-746	-7.66%	9,747
Washington	70,203	49.39%	69,137	48.64%	2,793	1.97%	1,066	0.75%	142,133
Watonwan	2,494	48.48%	2,517	48.93%	133	2.59%	-23	-0.45%	5,144
Wilkin	1,258	39.04%	1,884	58.47%	80	2.49%	-626	-19.43%	3,222
Winona	14,980	55.01%	11,480	42.16%	772	2.83%	3,500	12.85%	27,232
Wright	25,741	37.96%	40,466	59.67%	1,609	2.37%	-14,725	-21.71%	67,816
Yellow Medicine	2,465	45.53%	2,806	51.83%	143	2.64%	-341	-6.30%	5,414
Totals	1,546,167	52.65%	1,320,225	44.96%	70,169	2.39%	225,942	7.69%	2,936,561

Counties that flipped from Democratic to Republican

- Aitkin (largest city: Aitkin)
- Big Stone (largest city: Ortonville)
- Grant (largest city: Elbow Lake)
- Lincoln (largest city: Tyler)
- Marshall (largest city: Warren)
- Murray (largest city: Slayton)
- Pennington (largest city: Thief River Falls)
- Pine (largest city: Pine City)
- Polk (largest city: East Grand Forks)
- Pope (largest city: Glenwood)
- Red Lake (largest city: Red Lake Falls)
- Stevens (largest city: Morris)
- Watonwan (largest city: St. James)
- Yellow Medicine (largest city: Granite Falls)

==== By congressional district ====
Obama won six of eight congressional districts, including two held by Republicans. Romney won two, including one held by a Democrat.

District	Obama	Romney	Representative
1st	49%	48%	Tim Walz
2nd	48.9%	48.8%	John Kline
3rd	49.5%	48.7%	Erik Paulsen
4th	62%	35%	Betty McCollum
5th	73%	24%	Keith Ellison
6th	41%	56%	Michele Bachmann
7th	44%	54%	Collin Peterson
8th	51%	46%	Rick Nolan

== See also ==
- United States presidential elections in Minnesota
- 2012 Republican Party presidential debates and forums
- 2012 Republican Party presidential primaries
- Results of the 2012 Republican Party presidential primaries
