= Shakopee, Minnesota =

City in Minnesota, United States

- City
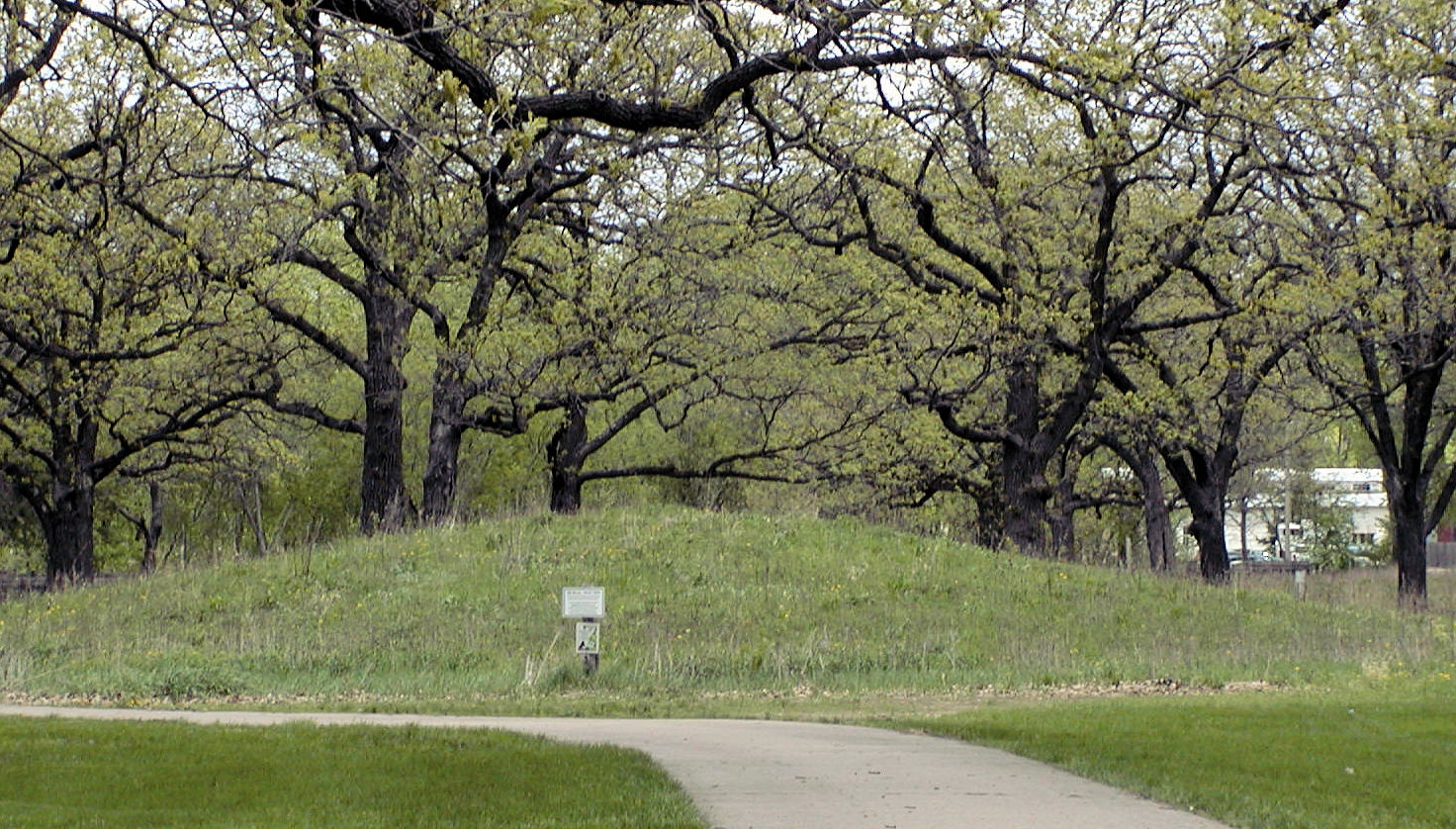
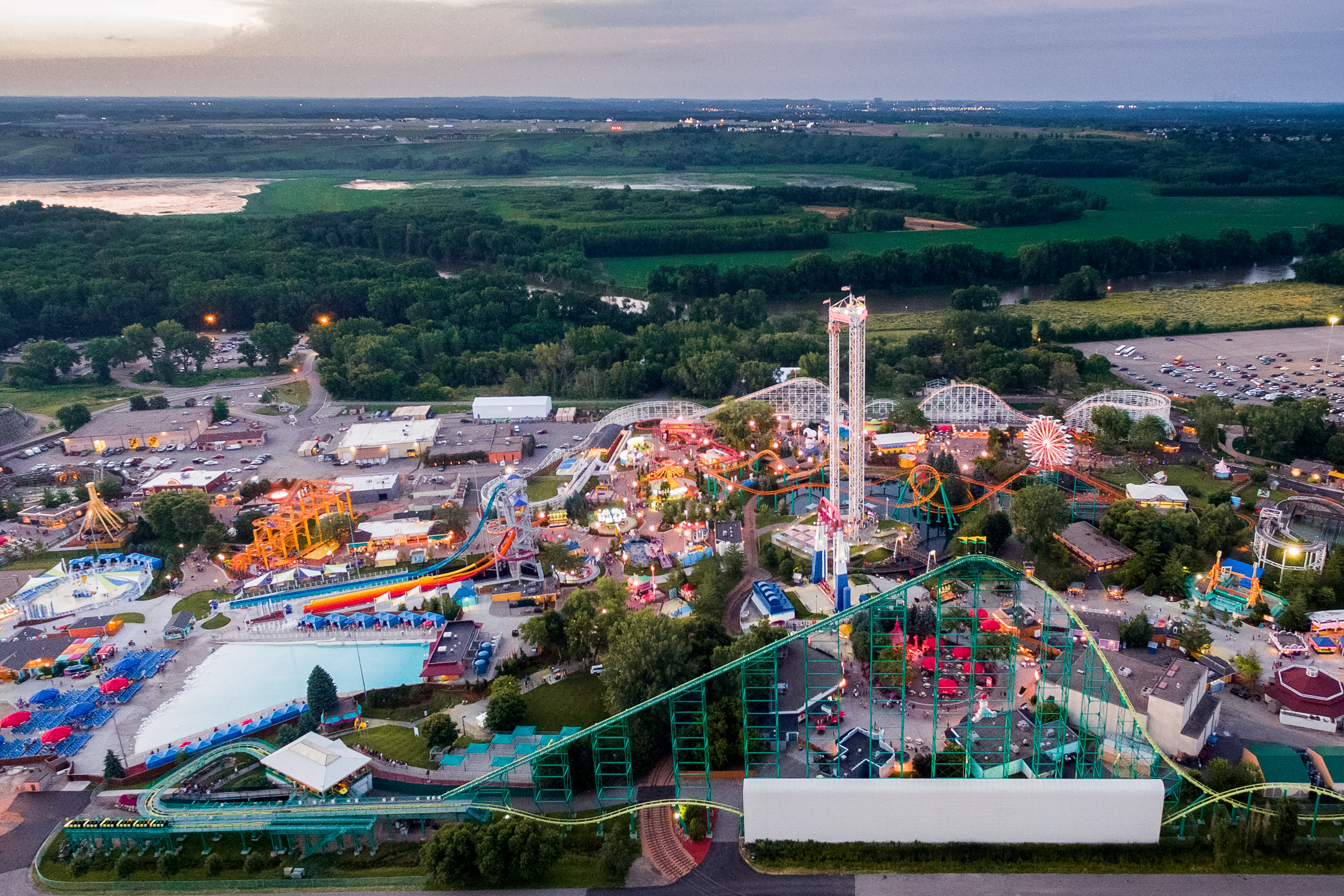
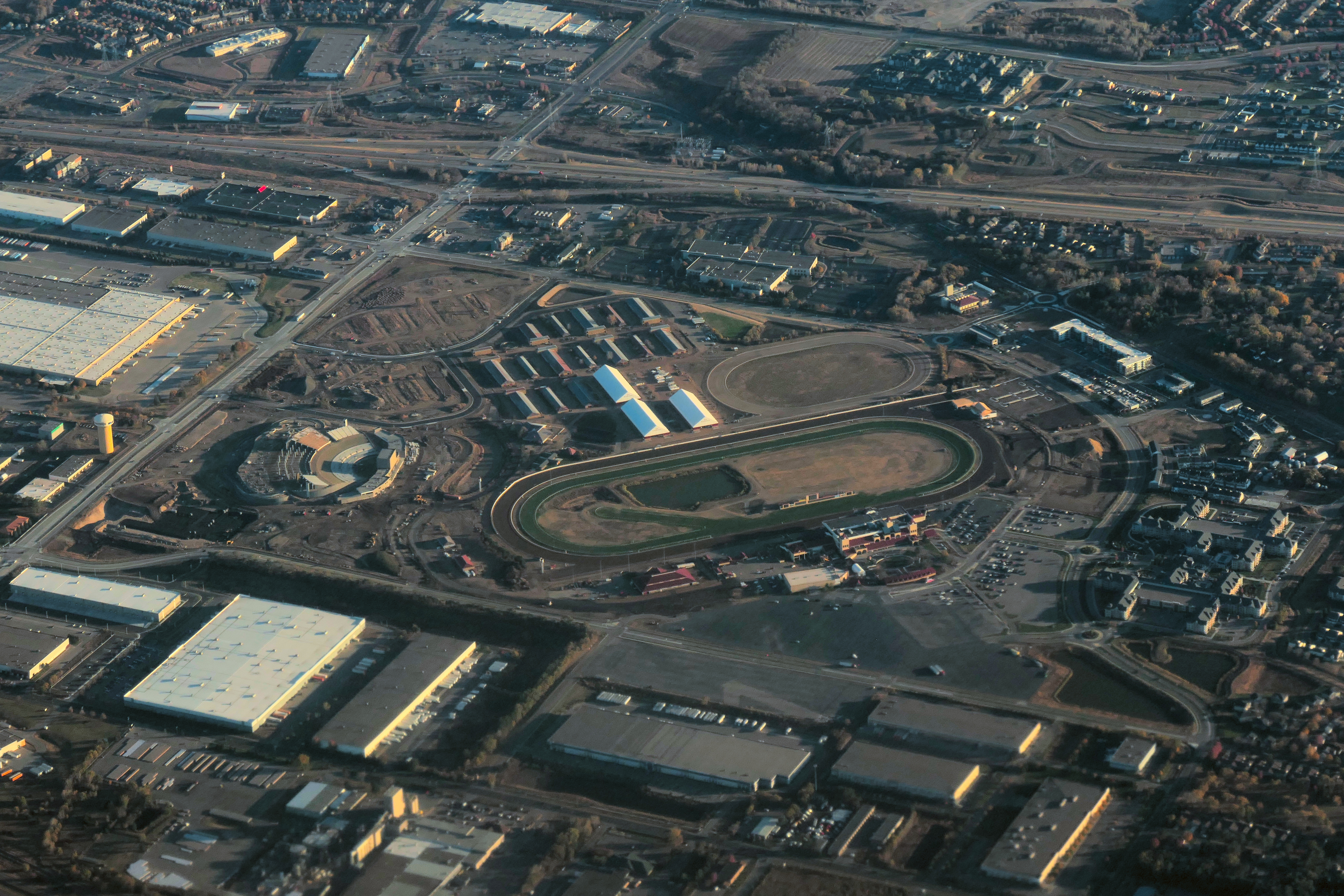
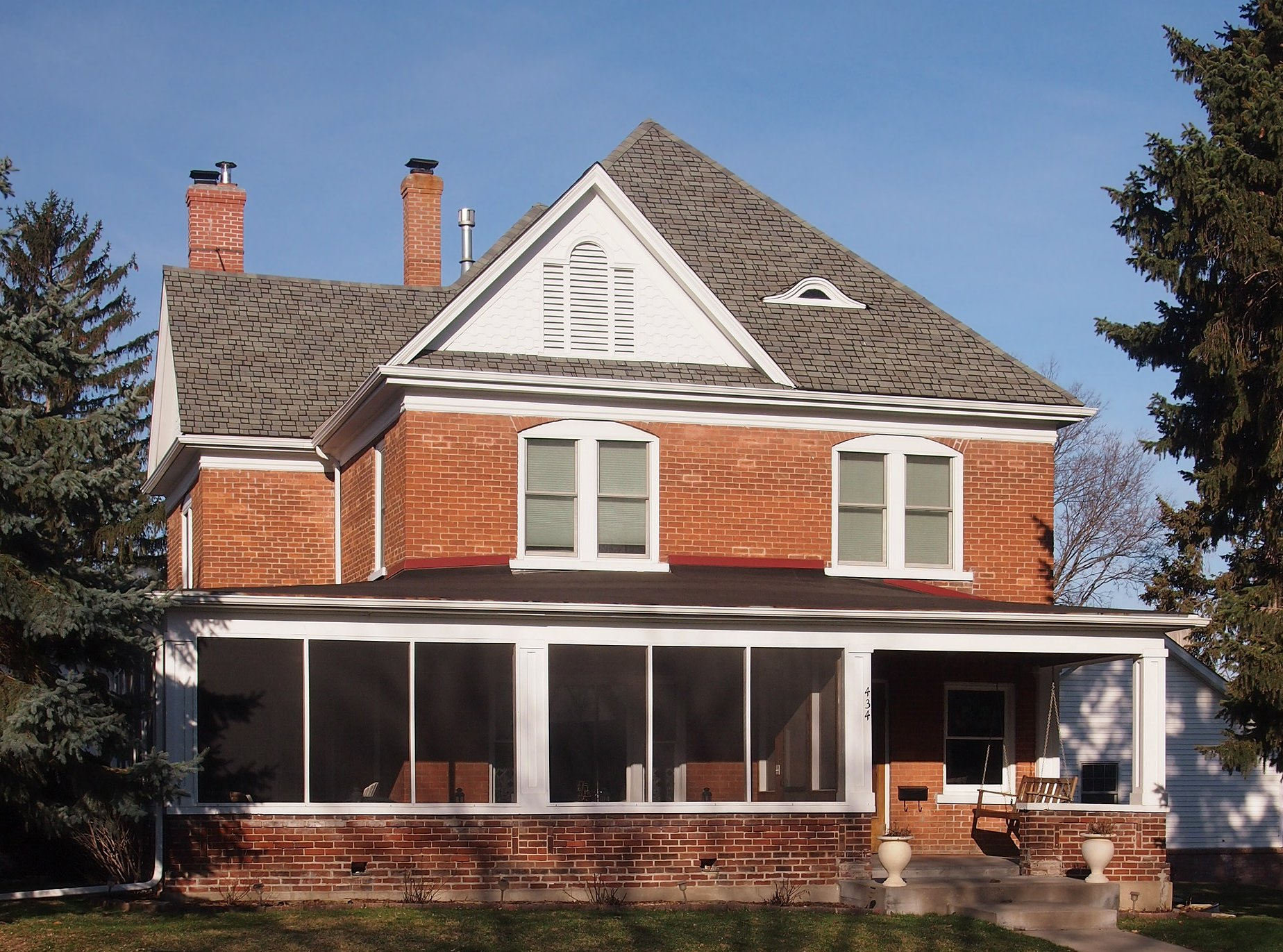
- Downtown Shakopee Shakopee Historic District Valleyfair Canterbury Park Julius A. Coller House

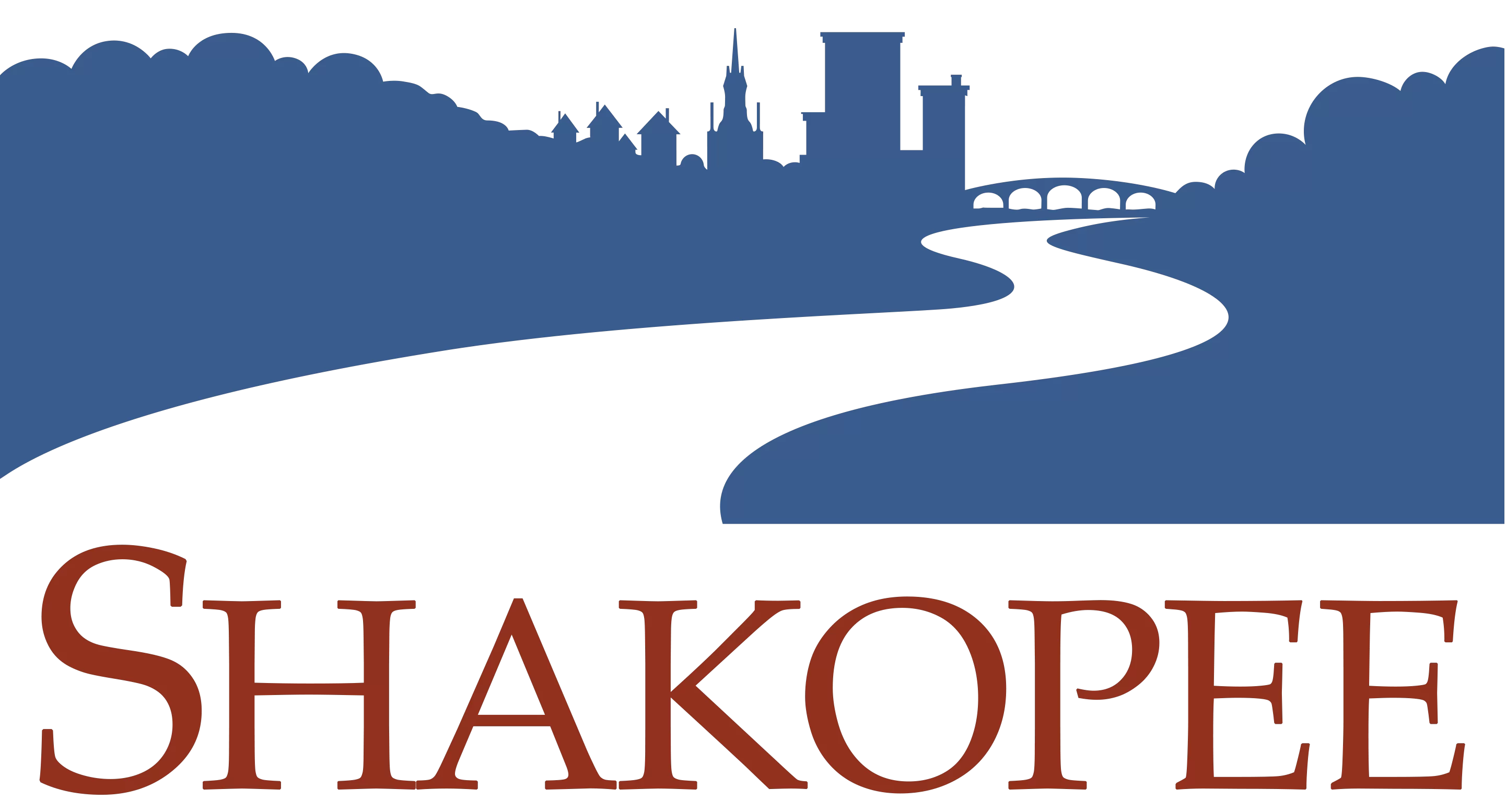
- Seal

- Location of the city of Shakopee within Scott County, Minnesota
- Coordinates: 44°46′47″N 93°31′38″W
- Country: United States
- State: Minnesota
- County: Scott
- Incorporated: 1857

Government
  - Mayor: Matt Lehman

Area
  - City: 30.22 sq mi (78.26 km^{2})
  - Land: 28.87 sq mi (74.77 km^{2})
  - Water: 1.35 sq mi (3.49 km^{2}) 4.47%
- Elevation: 830 ft (250 m)

Population (2020)
  - City: 43,698
  - Estimate (2025): 49,366
  - Rank: US: 871st MN: 21st
  - Density: 1,513.7/sq mi (584.45/km^{2})
  - Urban: 2,914,866 (US: 16th)
  - Metro: 3,693,729 (US: 16th)
- Time zone: UTC-6 (Central)
  - Summer (DST): UTC-5 (CDT)
- ZIP code: 55379
- Area code: 952
- FIPS code: 27-59350
- GNIS feature ID: 2395854
- Website: shakopeemn.gov

Shakopee (/ˈʃɑːkəpi/ SHAH-kə-pee) (Dakota language: Tinta Ottonwe) is a city in and the county seat of Scott County, Minnesota, United States. It is southwest of Minneapolis. Sited on the south bank bend of the Minnesota River, Shakopee and nearby suburbs comprise the southwest portion of Minneapolis-Saint Paul, the nation's 16th-largest metropolitan area, with 3.7 million people. The population was 43,698 at the 2020 census.

The riverbank's Shakopee Historic District contains burial mounds built by prehistoric cultures. In the 18th century, Chief Shakopee II of the Mdewakanton Dakota established his village on the east end of this area, near the water. Trading led to the city's establishment in the 19th century. Shakopee boomed as a commerce exchange site between river and rail at Murphy's Landing.

Shakopee was once an isolated city in the Minnesota River Valley, but by the 1960s its economy was tied to that of the expanding metropolitan area. Significant growth as a bedroom community occurred after U.S. Highway 169 was realigned in 1996 toward the new Bloomington Ferry Bridge.

The city is known for the Valleyfair amusement park and the Canterbury Park racetrack.

== History ==
Native Americans inhabited the area.

Burial mounds along the Minnesota River bluff, within the present-day Veterans Memorial Park, are between 500 and 2,000 years old.

Nicollet referred to the "Village of the Six", a permanent Dakota village south of the river, as acting as a boundary to the Ojibwe, but historians have since situated it east of the present downtown. He noted the village and locality was commonly called the "village of the prairie" (tinta ottonwe). The Shakopee band lived in summer bark lodges and winter tipis. They followed the changes of the seasons in planting cornfields.

With the 1851 Treaty of Traverse des Sioux, the Sioux tribe ceded land, and many relocated to Chief Shakopee II's village. The latter people had moved south to what was later assigned to them as the Shakopee-Mdewakanton Indian Reservation in nearby Prior Lake.

In 1851, Thomas A. Holmes established a trading post west of the Dakota and platted Shakopee Village in 1854, named after Chief Shakopee II. The city quickly grew, incorporating in 1857. It surrendered its charter in 1861 due to conflicts in the Dakota War. As tensions lifted, the city incorporated again in 1870. The western end retained township status and was renamed Jackson Township in 1861, likely after President Andrew Jackson.

== Geography ==
According to the United States Census Bureau, the city has an area of 29.32 square miles (75.94 km^{2}); 28.01 square miles (72.55 km^{2}) is land and 1.31 square miles (3.39 km^{2}) is water.

U.S. Highway 169 and County Highway 101 are two of Shakopee's main routes. Highway 169 and nearby State Highway 13 connect Shakopee to the rest of the Minneapolis–Saint Paul region. County Highway 101 serves as a major east–west connector route of historic downtown Shakopee.

== Demographics ==
Historical population
Census	Pop.	Note	%±
1860	1,138		—
1870	1,349		18.5%
1880	2,011		49.1%
1890	1,757		−12.6%
1900	2,047		16.5%
1910	2,302		12.5%
1920	1,988		−13.6%
1930	2,023		1.8%
1940	2,418		19.5%
1950	3,185		31.7%
1960	5,201		63.3%
1970	6,876		32.2%
1980	9,941		44.6%
1990	11,739		18.1%
2000	20,568		75.2%
2010	37,076		80.3%
2020	43,698		17.9%
2025 (est.)	49,366		13.0%
U.S. Decennial Census; 2020 Census

=== 2020 census ===
As of the 2020 census, Shakopee had a population of 43,698. The median age was 35.2 years. 27.9% of residents were under the age of 18 and 9.6% of residents were 65 years of age or older. For every 100 females there were 96.2 males, and for every 100 females age 18 and over there were 93.4 males age 18 and over.

97.5% of residents lived in urban areas, while 2.5% lived in rural areas.

There were 14,722 households in Shakopee, of which 42.3% had children under the age of 18 living in them. Of all households, 54.8% were married-couple households, 16.3% were households with a male householder and no spouse or partner present, and 21.1% were households with a female householder and no spouse or partner present. About 20.0% of all households were made up of individuals and 6.7% had someone living alone who was 65 years of age or older.

There were 15,378 housing units, of which 4.3% were vacant. The homeowner vacancy rate was 0.6% and the rental vacancy rate was 6.3%.

Racial composition as of the 2020 census
Race	Number	Percent
White	28,354	64.9%
Black or African American	4,117	9.4%
American Indian and Alaska Native	651	1.5%
Asian	5,173	11.8%
Native Hawaiian and Other Pacific Islander	14	0.0%
Some other race	2,173	5.0%
Two or more races	3,216	7.4%
Hispanic or Latino (of any race)	4,010	9.2%

=== 2010 census ===
As of the census of 2010, there were 37,076 people, 12,772 households, and 9,275 families living in the city. The population density was 1,323.7 inhabitants per square mile (511.1/km^{2}). There were 13,339 housing units at an average density of 476.2 per square mile (183.9/km^{2}). The racial makeup of the city was 77.0% White, 4.3% African American, 1.2% Native American, 10.3% Asian, 4.5% from other races, and 2.7% from two or more races. Hispanic or Latino of any race were 7.8% of the population.

There were 12,772 households, of which 45.5% had children under the age of 18 living with them, 57.1% were married couples living together, 10.5% had a female householder with no husband present, 4.9% had a male householder with no wife present, and 27.4% were non-families. 20.4% of all households were made up of individuals, and 5.7% had someone living alone who was 65 years of age or older. The average household size was 2.83 and the average family size was 3.31.

The median age in the city was 32.2 years. 30.2% of residents were under the age of 18; 6.6% were between the ages of 18 and 24; 37.2% were from 25 to 44; 19.2% were from 45 to 64; and 6.8% were 65 years of age or older. The gender makeup of the city was 48.8% male and 51.2% female.

=== 2000 census ===
As of the census of 2000, there were 20,568 people, 7,540 households and 5,360 families living in the city. The population density was 761.7 inhabitants per square mile (294.1/km^{2}). There were 7,805 housing units at an average density of 289.0 per square mile (111.6/km^{2}). The racial makeup of the city was 91.61% White, 1.33% African American, 0.94% Native American, 2.41% Asian, 0.04% Pacific Islander, 2.14% from other races, and 1.54% from two or more races. Hispanic or Latino of any race were 4.40% of the population.

There were 7,540 households, of which 38.9% had children under the age of 18 living with them, 58.2% were married couples living together, 8.6% had a female householder with no husband present, and 28.9% were non-families. 21.0% of all households were made up of individuals, and 5.7% had someone living alone who was 65 years of age or older. The average household size was 2.66 and the average family size was 3.12.

27.5% of the population were under the age of 18, 8.9% from 18 to 24, 38.8% from 25 to 44, 17.5% from 45 to 64, and 7.4% who were 65 years of age or older. The median age was 32 years. For every 100 females, there were 98.1 males. For every 100 females age 18 and over, there were 94.6 males.

The median household income was $59,137 and the median family income was $66,885 (these figures had risen to $72,523 and $83,235 respectively in a 2007 estimate). Males had a median income of $41,662 versus $32,244 for females. The per capita income for the city was $25,128. About 1.8% of families and 3.5% of the population were below the poverty line, including 3.6% of those under age 18 and 4.4% of those age 65 or over.

== Economy ==
=== Top employers ===
According to the city's 2023 Annual Comprehensive Financial Report (ACFR), Shakopee's top employers are:

#	Employer	# of Employees
1	Amazon	2,500
2	Valleyfair	1,721
3	Emerson	1,563
4	School District No. 720	1,315
5	Cyberpower Systems	1,160
6	Imagine Print Solutions	877
7	Scott County	865
8	St. Francis RMC	824
9	Entrust Datacard	800
10	Northstar Auto Auction	715

== Arts and culture ==
- Valleyfair is an amusement park.
- The Landing is an 88-acre (360,000 m^{2}) historic village on the Minnesota River, representing Minnesota life from the 1840 to 1890.
- Canterbury Park is a horse racetrack and card club.
- Minnesota Renaissance Festival is an interactive outdoor event that recreates a fictional 16th-century "England-like" fantasy kingdom.
- Downtown Shakopee has numerous boutiques and restaurants, an old-fashioned bakery, Turtle's 1890 Social Center, riverside concerts, and summertime biweekly classic car shows.
- Scott County Historical Society Museum features the historic 1908 Stans House.
- Mystic Lake Amphitheater is a 19,000-seat concert venue.

== Government ==
United States presidential election results for Shakopee, Minnesota
Year	Republican		Democratic		Third party(ies)	
Year	No.	%	No.	%	No.	%
2000	5,033	50.61%	4,302	43.26%	610	6.13%
2004	8,236	56.23%	6,235	42.57%	175	1.19%
2008	8,232	48.70%	8,364	49.48%	308	1.82%
2012	9,429	50.78%	8,680	46.75%	458	2.47%
2016	8,910	46.59%	8,382	43.83%	1,833	9.58%
2020	9,953	44.42%	11,865	52.95%	591	2.64%
2024	10,632	46.48%	11,671	51.03%	569	2.49%

United States House of Representatives

- Angie Craig (D-MN-2)

State Legislature

- Eric Pratt (R-SD-54) in the Minnesota Senate
- Brad Tabke (D-HD-54A) in the Minnesota House

Scott County Board of Commissioners

- Barb Weckman Brekke - Precincts 5 and 13
- Jody Brennan - Precincts 1-4, 6-8 and 12A & 12 B
- Dave Beer - Precincts 9A, 9B, 10, 11 and 14

Matt Lehman is mayor.

== Education ==
Shakopee Public Schools (ISD 720) include five elementary schools, two middle schools, one senior high school, and two learning centers. The schools are:

- Red Oak Elementary
- Sun Path Elementary
- Sweeney Elementary
- Eagle Creek Elementary
- Jackson Elementary
- Shakopee West Middle School
- Shakopee East Middle School
- Shakopee High School
- Tokata Learning Center
- Pearson Early Learning Center
- SouthWest Metro Intermediate District 288

Shakopee is also the location of the Shakopee Area Catholic Schools.

Living Hope Lutheran School is a Christian pre-K-8 school of the Wisconsin Evangelical Lutheran Synod in Shakopee.

== Notable people ==
- Jamal Abu-Shamala, basketball player for the Minnesota Golden Gophers
- Jack Bergman, congressman and retired Marine lieutenant general
- Anthony Bonsante, professional boxer and competitor on the reality TV show The Contender
- Scott Ferrozzo, mixed martial artist
- Eleanor Gates, playwright
- William Geister, member of the Minnesota House of Representatives
- Amy Menke, professional ice hockey player
- Erik Mortensen, former member of the Minnesota House of Representatives
- Harrison J. Peck, lawyer, newspaper editor, mayor of Shakopee, and member of the Minnesota Senate
- Jason Perkins, professional basketball player
- Andrew Reiner, executive editor of Game Informer and guitarist in The Rapture Twins
- Maurice Stans, 19th U.S. secretary of commerce
- Christopher Straub, fashion designer and contestant on Project Runway
- Brad Tabke, member of the Minnesota House of Representatives

== In popular culture ==
- The Daily Show reported on the then fence-less women's prison in Shakopee, and arguments among citizens about adding a fence.
- Shakopee was the setting for a Saturday Night Live sketch in 2012, and in 2013 about the fictitious Shakopee Hip-Hop station "B108FM".
