= 1996 United States House of Representatives election in Vermont =

1996 United States House of Representatives election in Vermont's at-large district
- November 5, 1996
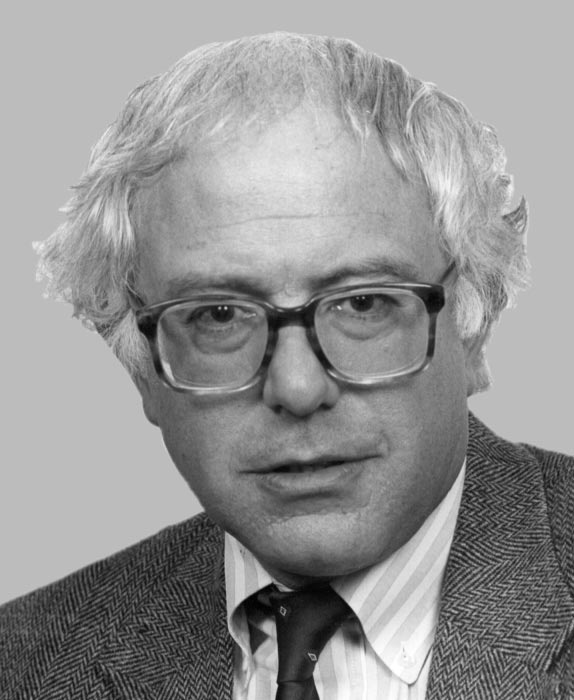

| Nominee | Bernie Sanders | Susan Sweetser | Jack Long |
| Party | Independent | Republican | Democratic |
| Popular vote | 140,678 | 83,021 | 23,830 |
| Percentage | 55.23% | 32.59% | 9.36% |
- Sanders: 30–40% 40–50% 50–60% 60–70% 70–80% Sweetser: 30–40% 40–50% 50–60% 70–80%
U.S. Representative before election
Bernie Sanders
Independent
Elected U.S. Representative
Bernie Sanders
Independent

The 1996 United States House of Representatives election in Vermont was held on Tuesday, November 5, 1996, to elect the U.S. representative from the state's at-large congressional district. The election coincided with the elections of other federal and state offices, including a quadrennial presidential election.

Incumbent Independent Bernie Sanders won re-election to a fourth term, defeating Republican Susan Sweetser and Democrat Jack Long.

== Republican primary ==
Republican primary results
| Party | Candidate | Votes | % |
|---|---|---|---|
| Republican | Susan Sweetser | 18,829 | 95.27 |
| Republican | Write-ins | 935 | 4.73 |
| Total votes | | 19,764 | 100.00 |

== Democratic primary ==
Democratic primary results
| Party | Candidate | Votes | % |
|---|---|---|---|
| Democratic | Jack Long | 9,291 | 67.95 |
| Democratic | Bernie Sanders (Write-in) | 4,037 | 29.52 |
| Democratic | Susan Sweetser (Write-in) | 203 | 1.48 |
| Democratic | Write-ins | 143 | 1.05 |
| Total votes | | 13,674 | 100.00 |

== Liberty Union primary ==
Liberty Union primary results
| Party | Candidate | Votes | % |
|---|---|---|---|
| Liberty Union | Peter Diamondstone | 237 | 88.76 |
| Liberty Union | Write-ins | 30 | 11.24 |
| Total votes | | 267 | 100.00 |

== General election ==
=== Candidates ===
- Peter Diamondstone (Liberty Union), perennial candidate and socialist activist
- Norio Kushi (Natural Law), organic foods consultant
- Jack Long (Democratic), lawyer
- Robert Melamede (Grassroots), associate research professor at the University of Vermont
- Thomas J. Morse (Libertarian), businessman
- Bernie Sanders (Independent), incumbent U.S. Representative
- Susan Sweetser (Republican), state senator

=== Campaign ===
National Republicans were eager to unseat Sanders, and had placed him on a list of 10 incumbent Representatives they would most heavily target in the 1996 cycle. Sanders had only narrowly won re-election to a third term in 1994, amidst a national red wave. The Republican nominee, state senator Susan Sweetser, was viewed as a rising star within the party and campaigned as a "social moderate and fiscal conservative", though she was viewed as a strictly conservative Republican. Sweetser's gender was viewed as a potential advantage by University of Vermont political analyst Garrison Nelson, who felt that it would prevent Sanders from utilizing his traditional aggressive campaign style. There was also a prominent Democratic candidate in the form of Jack Long, former commissioner of the Vermont Environmental Conservation Department, who campaigned as a moderate alternative to the other major candidates. Long's campaign faced staunch opposition from national Democratic strategists, with Rob Engel, political director of the Democratic Congressional Campaign Committee, accusing him of being a spoiler candidate attempting to throw the election to Sweetser.

Sweetser's campaign faced a major scandal after it was revealed that she had hired private investigator Cathy Riggs, the wife of California Congressman Frank Riggs, to perform opposition research on Sanders, with Riggs proceeding to investigate Sanders' first marriage by calling his ex-wife. This tactic was denounced by both Sanders and Long as a violation of privacy and political etiquette. Sweetser quickly apologized and claimed that she was not aware of Riggs' activities, but the event severely damaged her campaign nonetheless, as it was largely viewed as unacceptable "dirty campaigning" by the electorate.

=== Polling ===
| Poll source | Date(s) administered | Sample size | Margin of error | Bernie Sanders | Susan Sweetser | Jack Long | Other | Undecided |
|---|---|---|---|---|---|---|---|---|
| Becker Institute | October 1996 | | | 52% | 33% | 5% | | 10% |

=== Endorsements ===
Jack Long (D)

State officials

- Howard Dean, Governor of Vermont

Newspapers and publications

- The Burlington Free Press
Bernie Sanders (I)

Executive officials

- George Stephanopoulos, Senior Advisor to the President

Federal officials

- Barney Frank, U.S. Representative from MA-04

State officials

- Sally Conrad, former state senator
- Peter Shumlin, state senator

Individuals

- Fred Tuttle, farmer (Co-endorsement with Sweetser)
- Jane Sanders, congressional staffer and wife of Bernie Sanders
- Gloria Steinem, activist

Organizations

- Sierra Club
Susan Sweetser (R)

Executive officials

- Haley Barbour, Chair of the Republican National Committee and former White House Director of Political Affairs

Federal officials

- Dick Armey, U.S. Representative from TX-26 and House Majority Leader
- Susan Molinari, U.S. Representative from NY-13

Individuals

- Steve Forbes, publishing executive and former candidate for President
- Fred Tuttle, farmer (Co-endorsement with Sanders)

=== Results ===
Vermont's at-large congressional district election, 1996
| Party | Candidate | Votes | % |
|---|---|---|---|
| Independent | Bernie Sanders (incumbent) | 140,678 | 55.23 |
| Republican | Susan Sweetser | 83,021 | 32.59 |
| Democratic | Jack Long | 23,830 | 9.36 |
| Libertarian | Thomas J. Morse | 2,693 | 1.06 |
| Liberty Union | Peter Diamondstone | 1,965 | 0.77 |
| Grassroots | Robert Melamede | 1,350 | 0.53 |
| Natural Law | Norio Kushi | 812 | 0.32 |
| Write-ins | N/A | 357 | 0.14 |
| Total votes | | 254,706 | 100.00 |
| Independent hold | | | |
