= Grassroots–Legalize Cannabis Party =

Minnesota political party advocating marijuana legalization

- Abbreviation: G–LC
- Chairman: Oliver Steinberg
- Founder: Oliver Steinberg; Chris Wright
- Founded: 2014
- Dissolved: 2022
- Succeeded by: Minnesota Legal Marijuana Now! Party
- Headquarters: Saint Paul
- Ideology: Marijuana legalization Democratic socialism
- Colors: Green

Website
- www.grassrootsparty.net

The Grassroots–Legalize Cannabis Party (G–LC) was a political third party in the U.S. state of Minnesota created by Oliver Steinberg in 2014 to oppose cannabis prohibition. G–LC was a democratic socialist party with a background branching from the Grassroots Party established in 1986.

Grassroots–Legalize Cannabis Party attained major party status in Minnesota in 2018 when their Attorney General candidate, who dropped out of the race to support the Democratic candidate, but whose name nevertheless remained on ballots, received 5.7 percent of the vote.

In 2022, G–LC resumed minor party status, when none of their candidates got 5% of votes, which was required then for major party ballot access in Minnesota. However their candidate for Minnesota State Auditor received more than 1% of votes, in 2022, maintaining minor party status for G–LC until 2026, though the party became inactive after 2023.

== History ==
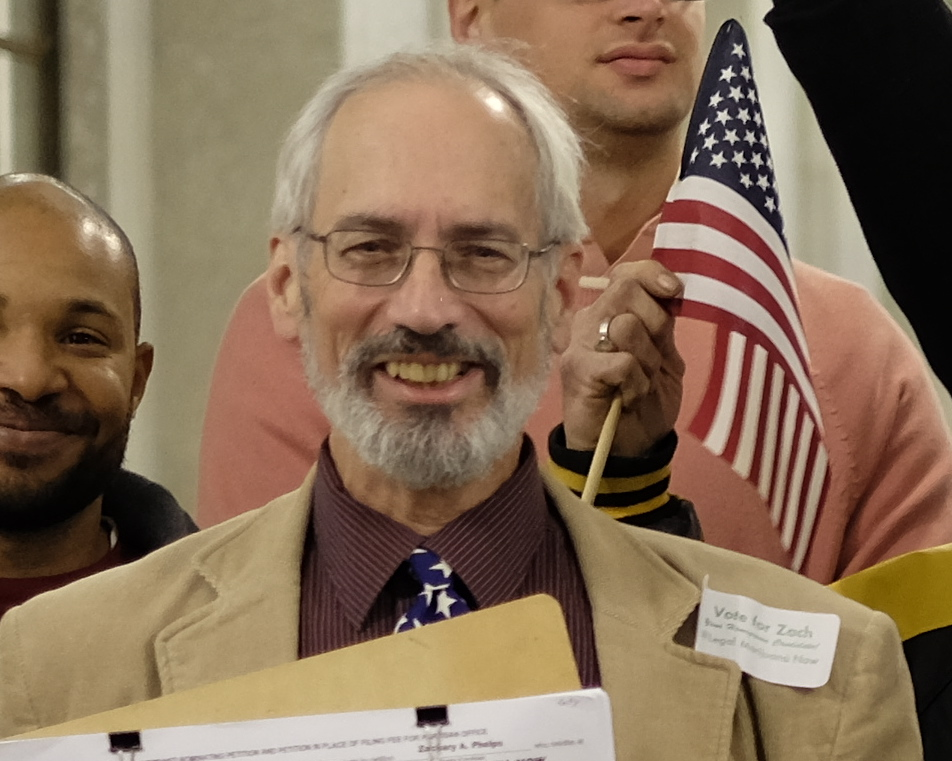
Oliver Steinberg at Minnesota State Capitol, 2015

In 2014, the Grassroots–Legalize Cannabis Party was established by Oliver Steinberg because Steinberg and Chris Wright were unwilling to join the rest of the Grassroots Party when they merged with the Minnesota Legal Marijuana Now! Party. Steinberg, who had been convicted and jailed for attempted murder of a police officer during the peace movement in the 1970s, previously ran as a Republican candidate in 1984 and a Grassroots candidate in 1990.

In the 2014 race for governor, Wright received 31,259 votes. The party also ran a candidate for State Auditor who received 55,132 votes.

The Grassroots–Legalize Cannabis Party nominated their candidates by petition in 2018 to run for Governor of Minnesota, as well as for Minnesota Attorney General, the results of which earned the group major-party status in Minnesota. A few weeks before the election, the Grassroots–Legalize Cannabis candidate for Attorney General, Noah Johnson, dropped out of the race to support Democratic/Farmer-Labor candidate Keith Ellison who was embroiled in scandal, though Johnson's name remained on the ballot.

Steinberg was the Grassroots–Legalize Cannabis candidate for United States Senator in 2020.

Perennial Republican candidate Rae Hart Anderson was nominated by Grassroots–Legalize Cannabis Party voters in the August 11 primary to run for United States Representative in Minnesota's 7th congressional district on November 3, 2020.

=== Gubernatorial candidates ===
The Grassroots–Legalize Cannabis Party nominated their candidates by petition in 2014 to run for Governor of Minnesota. In the race for governor, Chris Wright received 31,259 votes.

In 2018, Wright again was nominated by petition to run for Minnesota Governor, and received 68,664 votes in the November general election. Wright resigned as G–LC chairperson to seek Minnesota Legal Marijuana Now! Party’s nomination for Governor in 2022.

Steve Patterson, a Brownsdale businessman and opponent of Governor Tim Walz's COVID-19 lockdown, who blamed these forced closings for hurting small businesses, including his own Rochester beer taproom startup, was nominated in the August, 2022, G–LC gubernatorial primary. Patterson advanced to the general election on November 8, getting less than one percent of the votes. In addition to legalizing cannabis for personal use, Patterson supported reducing income taxes for working class people.

=== Conflict with Democratic Party ===
Even though Grassroots–Legalize Cannabis candidates have dropped out of running to support Democratic candidates in some tight races and party leaders have withheld the state party's endorsement of some Grassroots–Legalize Cannabis candidates when they thought doing so might hurt the chances of winning for struggling DFLers, several times Democratic Party leaders have accused the Grassroots–Legalize Cannabis Party of making it hard for Democratic candidates in Minnesota. However, a St. Cloud Times analysis of votes cast in the November 2020 election found that Grassroots–Legalize Cannabis candidates took at least as many, if not more, votes from Republicans than they took from DFL candidates.

=== 2021–2023 ===
In 2021, Kevin Shores told a FOX 9 television reporter that he was recruited the previous year to run for Congress in Minnesota's 7th district, where Democratic incumbent Collin Peterson lost the race to Republican challenger Michelle Fischbach, by a Republican strategist who Shores mistakenly thought was a G–LC representative. Shores, who is blind and suffers from Gulf War syndrome, lost to Hart Anderson in the Grassroots–Legalize Cannabis Party primary.

When a Luverne man who had been endorsed by G–LC was unable to file before the deadline, attorney Haroun McClellan filed to run in the August 9, 2022, 1st congressional district special election as a last-minute replacement. McClellan, a graduate of Georgia State University College of Law and former Hennepin County public defender, was contracts manager of a Rochester construction firm.

==== Conflict with DFL renewed ====
Before Minnesota’s May 2022 deadline to file such a change, Marcus Harcus, a Democratic Party activist who was 2020 G–LC nominee for District 59A state representative, attempted to hold a G–LC party meeting for the purpose of changing the name Grassroots–Legalize Cannabis to a party name Harcus thought might help the DFL by attracting Republicans.

In May 2022, G–LC chair Steinberg told a Star Tribune reporter about being worried that voters “perhaps aren’t quite as well-informed as it would be good for them to be.” Later in June, 2022, Steinberg said in an interview that he was frustrated about having former Libertarian candidates running under the G–LC party banner. In November, Will Finn commented about talking to Steinberg at the Secretary of State's office on May 31 when he filed for State Auditor in the race with DFLer Julie Blaha, a Republican challenger, and veteran hemp activist Tim Davis, the Legal Marijuana Now Party nominee, and Finn said Steinberg approved his being a "spoiler."

==== 2022 gubernatorial primary ====
Minnesota G–LC Party held a gubernatorial primary on August 9, 2022, between Steve Patterson & Matt Huff and Darrell Paulsen & Ed Engelmann. Patterson was nominated by G–LC voters and defeated Paulsen, receiving 59% of the party's vote, to advance onto the November 8, 2022, state general election.

==== Resuming minor party status ====
The G–LC Party ran statewide candidates in 2020 and 2022 but none received 5% of votes required for major party ballot access in Minnesota. The party got enough votes, more than 1%, in the Minnesota State Auditor race, in 2022, to retain official minor party privileges, including state public funding.

==== 2023 Minnesota Senate Public Safety Committee hearings ====
In January 2023, Steinberg testified before the Public Safety Committee in favor of Minnesota Senate File 73 to create a regulated commercial cannabis market, saying that marijuana prohibition has not kept people from using the drug, but has "succeeded perhaps in terrorizing or intimidating citizens, in canceling civil liberties, blighting both urban and rural communities, all without eradicating the outlawed substance." In May 2023, Steinberg wrote "I salute DFL lawmakers who finally understood that cannabis prohibition never was necessary; always was unjust and unjustifiable; and always lacked moral authority because it was actually designed to serve as a legal mechanism for racial repression."

According to political scholar William Labovitch, Minnesota's marijuana political parties, G–LC and LMN, are the ones responsible for the DFL party championing SF 73.

== Electoral history ==
=== Results in Minnesota state elections ===
| Year | Office | Candidate | Popular votes | Percentage |
|---|---|---|---|---|
| 2014 | MN Auditor | Judith Schwartzbacker | 55,132 | 2.87% |
| 2018 | MN Attorney General | Noah Johnson | 145,744 | 5.71% |
| 2020 | MN Senator 5 | Dennis Barsness | 967 | 2.14% |
| 2020 | MN Senator 20 | Jason Hoschette | 2,901 | 5.93% |
| 2020 | MN Senator 22 | Brian Abrahamson | 1,947 | 5.04% |
| 2020 | MN Senator 29 | Mary Murphy | 4,066 | 8.46% |
| 2020 | MN Senator 43 | Doug Daubenspeck | 3,950 | 8.46% |
| 2020 | MN Senator 63 | Chris Wright | 3,460 | 6.59% |
| 2020 | MN Representative 59A | Marcus Harcus | 4,054 | 24.46% |
| 2022 | MN Auditor | Will Finn | 44,270 | 1.80% |
| 2022 | MN Senator 25 | Bill Rood | 699 | 2.08% |

=== Results in Minnesota gubernatorial elections ===
| Year | Governor candidate | Lt. Governor candidate | Votes | Percentage |
|---|---|---|---|---|
| 2014 | Chris Wright | David Daniels | 31,259 | 1.58% |
| 2018 | Chris Wright | Judith Schwartzbacker | 68,664 | 2.65% |
| 2022 | Steve Patterson | Matt Huff | 22,598 | 0.90% |

=== Results in federal elections ===
| Year | Office | Candidate | Popular votes | Percentage |
|---|---|---|---|---|
| 2020 | U.S. Senator | Oliver Steinberg | 57,174 | 1.78% |
| 2020 | U.S. Representative 1 | Bill Rood | 21,448 | 5.81% |
| 2020 | U.S. Representative 4 | Susan Sindt | 29,537 | 7.59% |
| 2020 | U.S. Representative 7 | Rae Hart Anderson | 6,499 | 1.79% |
| 2020 | U.S. Representative 8 | Judith Schwartzbacker | 22,190 | 5.64% |
| 2022 | U.S. Representative 1 | Haroun McClellan | 873 | 0.70% |
| 2022 | U.S. Representative 1 | Brian Abrahamson | 4,942 | 1.67% |

== See also ==
- Cannabis political parties of Minnesota
