= 1994 United States Senate election in Vermont =

- November 8, 1994
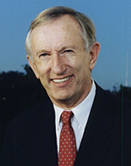

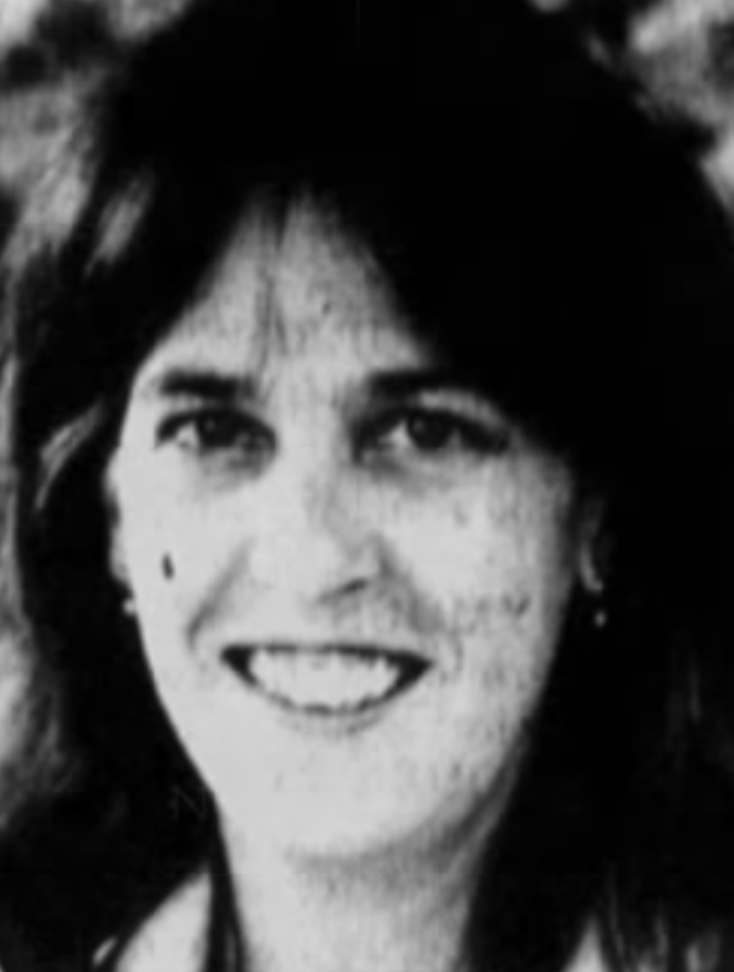

Nominee	Jim Jeffords	Jan Backus	Gavin T. Mills
Party	Republican	Democratic	Independent
Popular vote	106,505	85,868	12,465
Percentage	50.32%	40.57%	5.89%
- Jeffords: 30–40% 40–50% 50–60% 60–70% 70–80% 80–90% Backus: 40–50% 50–60% 60–70%
U.S. senator before election
Jim Jeffords
Republican
Elected U.S. Senator
Jim Jeffords
Republican

The 1994 United States Senate election in Vermont was held, where incumbent centrist Republican senator Jim Jeffords won re-election to a second term against state senator Jan Backus and independent Gavin Mills. He won every county in the state.

== Democratic primary ==
=== Candidates ===
- Jan Backus, State Senator from Windham County
- Douglas M. Costle, former Administrator of the EPA

=== Results ===
Democratic Primary results
Party	Candidate	Votes	%
Democratic	Jan Backus	16,217	53.65
Democratic	Doug Costle	13,139	43.46
Democratic	Write-ins	873	2.89
Total votes		30,229	100.00

== Republican primary ==
=== Candidates ===
- Jim Jeffords, incumbent U.S. Senator

=== Results ===
Republican primary results
Party	Candidate	Votes	%
Republican	Jim Jeffords (Incumbent)	24,795	91.56
Republican	Write-ins	2,285	8.44
Total votes		27,080	100.00

== Liberty Union primary ==
=== Candidates ===
- Jerry Levy, sociologist and perennial candidate

=== Results ===
Liberty Union primary results
Party	Candidate	Votes	%
Liberty Union	Jerry Levy	289	90.03
Liberty Union	Write-ins	32	9.97
Total votes		321	100.00

== General election ==
=== Candidates ===
- Jan Backus (Democratic), State Senator
- Jim Jeffords (Republican), incumbent U.S. Senator
- Jerry Levy (Liberty Union), sociologist and perennial candidate
- Bob Melamede (Grassroots)
- Gavin Mills (I), former State Chairman of United We Stand America
- Matthew Mulligan (I)
- Joseph Victor Pardo (Natural Law)

=== Results ===
General election results
Party	Candidate	Votes	%	±%
Republican	Jim Jeffords (Incumbent)	106,505	50.32%	−17.65%
Democratic	Jan Backus	85,868	40.57%	+10.80%
Independent	Gavin T. Mills	12,465	5.89%	
Independent	Matthew S. Mulligan	3,141	1.48%	
Grassroots	Bob Melamede	1,416	0.67%	
Liberty Union	Jerry Levy	1,376	0.65%	−0.40%
Natural Law	Joseph Victor Pardo	709	0.33%	
Write-ins		192	0.09%	
Majority		20,637	9.75%	−28.45%
Turnout		211,672		
Republican hold		Swing		

== See also ==
- 1994 United States Senate elections
