= Robert Melamede =

American microbiologist and genetic researcher

- Born: December 7, 1947; New York City, New York
- Died: April 19, 2023 (aged 75); Shelburne, Vermont
- Other name: Dr. Bob Melamede
- Education: Lehman College (BA); Graduate Center of the City University of New York (PhD)
- Occupations: DNA researcher, businessman
- Years active: 1970s–2023
- Known for: Medical cannabis advocacy
- Notable work: Harm reduction - The cannabis paradox (2005)
- Political party: Libertarian (2012)
- Other political affiliations: Grassroots (1994–1998)
- Children: Vanessa Berman
- Scientific career
- Fields: Genetics; molecular biology
- Workplaces: University of Colorado Colorado Springs; New York Medical College; University of Vermont
- Thesis: DNA synthesis in the nonlethal recombination repair deficient x and y mutants of bacteriophage T4 (1972)

Robert J. Melamede (December 7, 1947 – April 19, 2023), known internationally as "Dr. Bob" or "Dr. Bob Melamede" was a genetic researcher, microbiologist, and author, whose views promoting the curative properties of cannabis put him at odds with mainstream academia. An expert on the human endocannabinoid system, Melamede contended that marijuana has anti-aging properties, and high doses of cannabis oil extract can cure cancer.

== Career ==
=== Early life and education ===
Born in 1947, in New York City, New York, Melamede earned Bachelor of Arts degrees in anatomy and physiology from Lehman College, and doctorate in biochemistry and molecular genetics from Graduate Center of the City University of New York.

=== Teaching career ===
After earning his doctorate at Graduate Center of the City University of New York, Robert Melamede taught at New York Medical College during the 1970s and 1980s, and at University of Vermont from the late 1980s until 2001, becoming associate professor and Biology Department chair at University of Colorado Colorado Springs, from 2000 to 2014.

Melamede lived in Vermont during the 1990s, and moved to Colorado from 2001 until returning to Vermont, after retirement. Following his retirement from teaching at University of Colorado Colorado Springs, Melamede became CEO and president of Cannabis Science, an Irvine, California biotech firm.

=== Filmography ===
Melamede played a role as himself in movie documentaries, including:

- American Drug War: The Last White Hope (2006)
- The True History of Marijuana (2010)
- American Drug War 2: Cannabis Destiny (2013)

=== Political career ===
Melamede was Vermont Grassroots Party candidate for United States Senator in 1994 and 1998, and for United States Representative in 1996, and was Libertarian Party nominee in 2012 for Colorado House of Representatives.

- United States Senator from Vermont in 1994, and 1998
- United States Representative from Vermont in 1996
- Colorado State Representative from Colorado's 18th House of Representatives district in 2012

=== Philanthropy ===
Melamede also served from 2007–2023 as science adviser and program director for nonprofit Phoenix Tears Foundation, a group promoting cannabis education, research and advocacy.

=== Writings ===
Melamede was author or co-author of at least 45 frequently cited publications, including:

- Harm reduction - The cannabis paradox (2005)
- Cannabis and tobacco smoke are not equally carcinogenic (2005)
- Dissipative Structures and the Origins of Life (2008)
- Endocannabinoids: Multi-scaled, Global Homeostatic Regulators of Cells and Society (2008)

== Death ==
After a stroke in March 2022 left Melamede paralyzed on his left side, and then a July 2022 heart attack, Melamede underwent surgery for a pacemaker. Melamede had hip replacement surgery in November 2022, and following hospitalization his health declined. While living at a nursing home and residential care facility in Shelburne, Vermont, Melamede developed a urinary tract infection, then sepsis leading to his death on April 19, 2023. According to his family, despite having the stroke Melamede retained his faculties and high quality of life until the end, at age 75, when his death from kidney failure was sudden.
