= Geister =

Geister may refer to:

- The plural form of the German word Geist

== People ==
- Hans Geister (1928–2012), German track and field athlete
- Iztok Geister (born 1945), Slovene writer, poet, essayist and ornithologist
- Paul Geister (born 1972), Australian rules footballer
- William Geister (1876-1942), American politician

== Television ==
- Geisters, an anime television series
- Geisters, antagonists in the anime television series Brave Exkaiser
