= Sally Conrad =

American politician

Sally Y. Conrad (born March 1, 1941) is an American politician who served in the Vermont State Senate for three terms. A native of Boston, Conrad moved to Vermont in 1970. She won election to the State Senate in 1986, on a campaign budget of $1,000. While in the State Senate she was part of the "progressive group", along with fellow Democrats Peter Welch and Philip H. Hoff. Conrad endorsed Bernie Sanders' re-election campaign in 1996, praising his commitment to feminism in a speech.
