= Chris Wright (activist) =

American cannabis rights activist (born 1957)

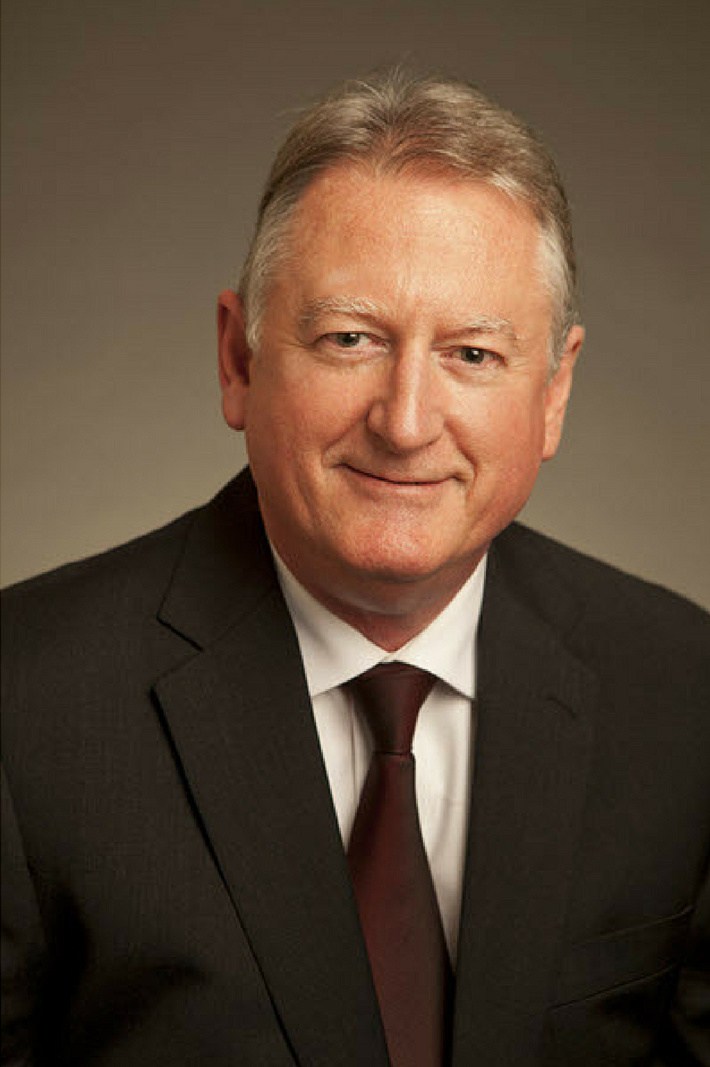
- Wright in Minneapolis, Minnesota, 2017
- Born: Thomas Christopher Wright; October 14, 1957 (age 69); San Diego, California
- Occupations: Businessman, politician
- Known for: Cannabis rights activism
- Political party: Legal Marijuana Now (2022–present)
- Other political affiliations: Grassroots–Legalize Cannabis (2014–2020); Grassroots (1986–2010)
- Website: www.votewright.org

Thomas Christopher Wright (born October 14, 1957) is an American businessman, cannabis rights and free speech activist, and frequent candidate for public office. Wright, who co-founded the Grassroots Party in 1986, owns a computer repair shop in Bloomington, Minnesota.

In addition to legalizing drugs, Wright promotes using hydrogen as fuel.

== Activism ==
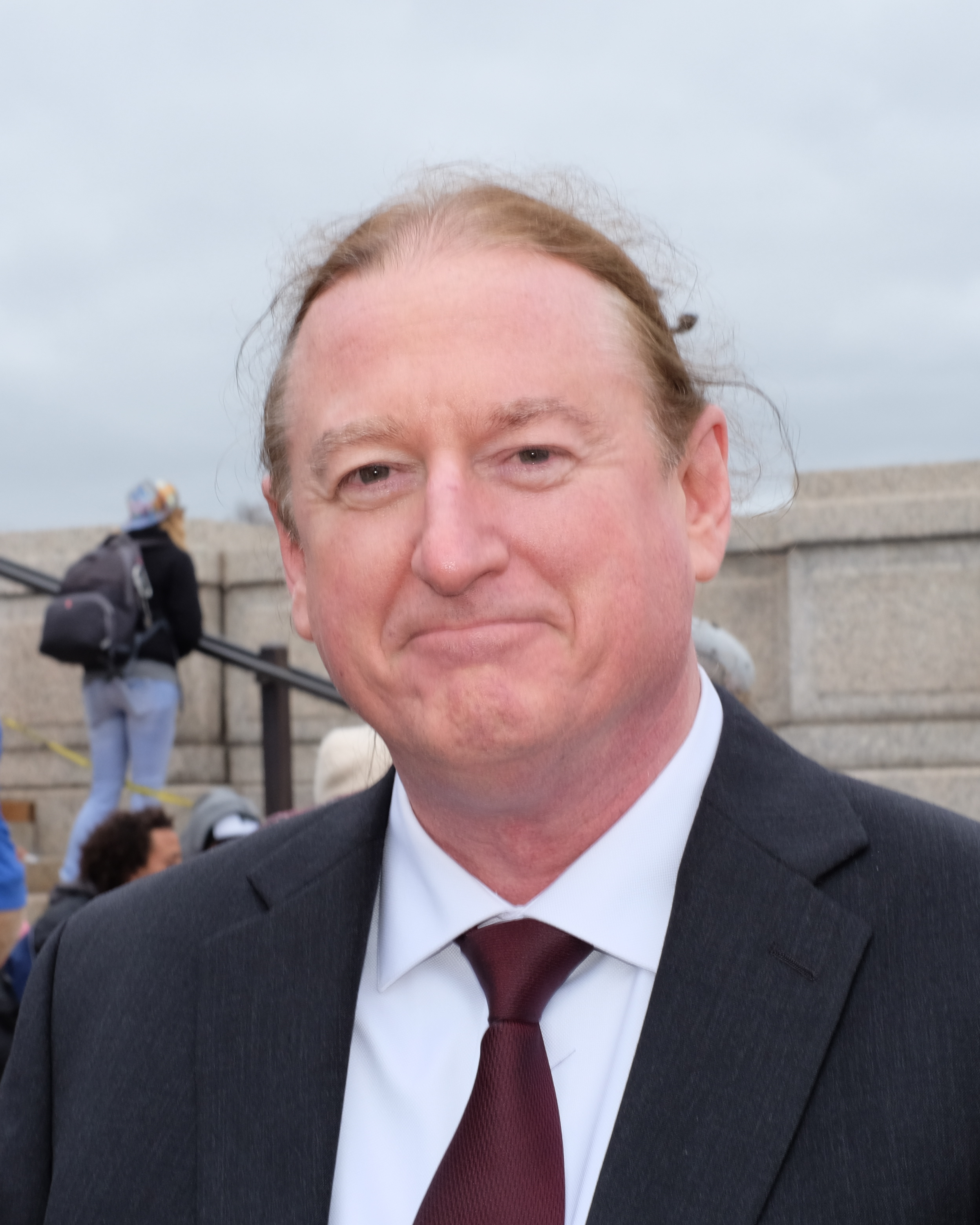
Chris Wright, soon after speaking at a rally held in the Minnesota State Capitol, April 20, 2017

Chris Wright organized the Minnesota Tea Party, a cannabis rights rally held on the steps of the Minnesota State Capitol every September from 1987 to 2013. Wright ran for U.S. Representative for Minnesota's 5th congressional district in 1988 as a Grassroots candidate.

A political rally and music festival called Grassroots Gathering, organized by Wright in 1992, which was to be held on a private campground near Ogilvie, Minnesota, was cancelled by authorities citing incidents reported at the Weedstock festival in Wisconsin the previous year.

Wright was arrested in 1996 for growing 41 cannabis plants at his home in Minneapolis. He appealed the conviction and lost. Wright argued that under Art. XIII, Sec. 7 of the Minnesota Constitution any person may sell the products of the farm or garden occupied by him without obtaining a license. The Minnesota Court of Appeals reasoned that product labeling, and other restrictions established previously, granted police authority to ban cannabis.

Grassroots Party operated a booth inside the Minnesota State Fair throughout the 1990s; Amid occurrences of political violence in 2025, Wright recalled being confronted at the Grassroots Party State Fair booth by people who said he "should be shot" for expressing his opinion about legalizing marijuana; Wright continued defending American free speech, and condemned divisive politics, instead promoting political unity across the country.

In 1998, Wright was endorsed by the Grassroots Party for Governor of Minnesota; He got 1,727 votes. In the 2010 Minnesota gubernatorial election, Wright got 7,516 votes as a Grassroots candidate. In 2014, Wright got 31,259 votes for governor as a Grassroots–Legalize Cannabis candidate. Wright was nominated by petition to run for Governor of Minnesota in 2018 as a Grassroots–Legalize Cannabis Party candidate and received 68,664 votes.

In 2022, Wright resigned as chair of G–LC, a post he held for years, to seek Minnesota Legal Marijuana Now! Party nomination for governor. Wright was eliminated in the primary, receiving 48% of the party's vote.

Wright was an organizer of 2023 Minnesota Legal Marijuana Now state and local conventions, with speakers and music by Paul Metsa and Kung Fu Hippies, that grew into a celebration rally on the capitol steps, April 29; During the event, state party chair Dennis Schuller said that federal prohibition laws against cannabis, overseeing implementation of the state's regulated market, and expungement of past criminal records, are among tasks that remain for Minnesota Legal Marijuana Now! Party.

== Political candidacy ==
A founding member of the Grassroots Party in 1986, Chris Wright ran as their candidate, between 1988 and 2010, multiple times. In 2014, Wright and Oliver Steinberg formed the Minnesota Grassroots–Legalize Cannabis Party, and Wright has also run as their nominee several times from 2014–2020, and as a Legal Marijuana Now candidate in 2022, for offices including:

- United States Representative from Minnesota's 5th congressional district in 1988
- Governor of Minnesota in 1998, 2010, 2014, 2018, and 2022
- State Senator from Minnesota's 63rd legislative district in 2020
