= Jan Backus =

American politician

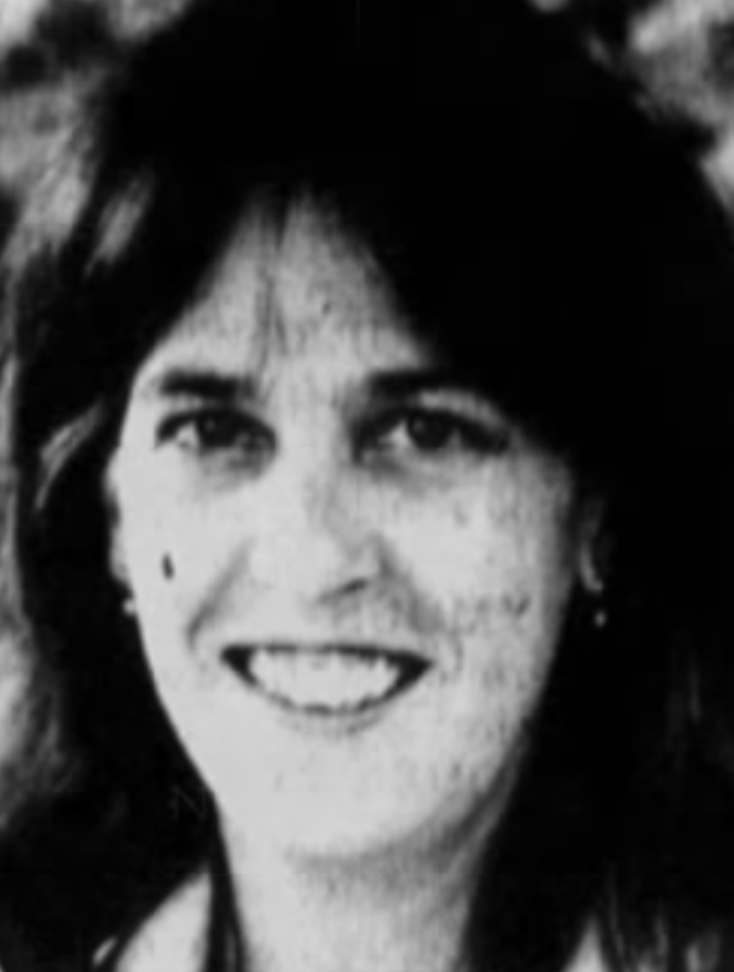
- Backus in November 1988

Personal details
- Born: July 30, 1947 (age 79) Norristown, Pennsylvania, U.S.
- Party: Democratic
- Education: University of Vermont (BA)

Jan Backus (born July 30, 1947) is a retired American politician who served as a Vermont state senator representing Windham County from 1989 to 1994 and Chittenden County from 1997 to 2000. A community activist, Backus served as a member of the Vermont Southeast Supervisory Union board for many years before making a run for the Vermont state Senate and winning a seat. She served as chairwoman of the Senate Health & Welfare Committee and a member of the Senate Judiciary Committee.

A moderate-to-liberal Democrat, Backus ran for the U.S. Senate in 1994 and beat Douglas M. Costle, Environmental Protection Agency administrator under President Jimmy Carter, for her party's nomination and came within 9 points of ousting incumbent U.S. Senator Jim Jeffords (R-VT). In 2000, she ran again and lost the Democratic U.S. Senate primary to Ed Flanagan, then Vermont's Auditor of Accounts. In 2004 Backus ran for the Democratic nomination for lieutenant governor.

Backus lives in Winooski, Vermont, with her husband Steve Blodgett (a former state senator). She currently serves as a member of Winooski's Downtown Revitalization Project to eliminate sprawl and attract jobs. She has three daughters, one of whom served as a high-ranking member of John Kerry's presidential campaign in 2004.

Backus competes annually in the National Crossword Championship. Her highest finish was 46th.

Party political offices
Preceded by Bill Gray	Democratic nominee for U.S. Senator from Vermont (Class 1); 1994	Succeeded by Ed Flanagan
