= William Geister =

American politician (1876–1942)

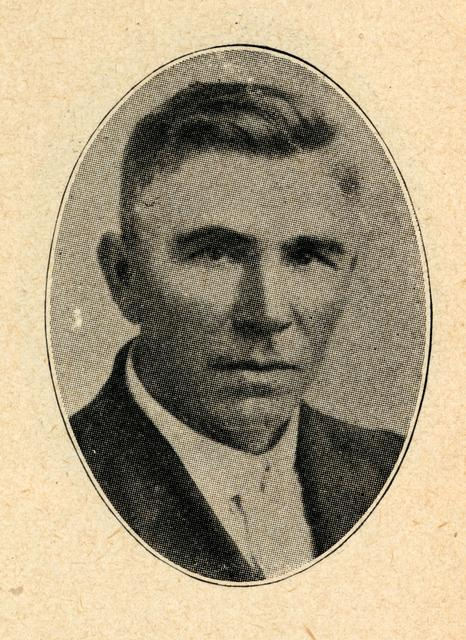

Member of the Minnesota House of Representatives from the 21st district
- In office January 2, 1923 – January 5, 1925

Personal details
- Born: March 26, 1876 Spring Lake Township, Scott County, Minnesota, U.S.
- Died: January 17, 1942 (aged 65) Scott County, Minnesota, U.S.
- Occupation: Politician

William Geister (March 26, 1876 – January 17, 1942) was an American politician who served in the Minnesota House of Representatives from 1923 to 1925, representing the 21st legislative district of Minnesota in the 43rd Minnesota Legislature.

== Early life and education ==
Geister was born and raised on a farm in Spring Lake Township, Scott County, Minnesota.

== Career ==
Geister served as the town clerk of Spring Lake Township from June 1906 until an unknown date.

Geister served in the Minnesota House of Representatives from 1923 to 1925, representing the 21st legislative district of Minnesota in the 43rd Minnesota Legislature.

During his time in office, Geister served on the following committees:

- Board of Control and State Institutions
- Engrossment and Enrollment
- General Legislation
- Public Buildings
- Reapportionment

Geister's time in office began on January 2, 1923, and concluded on January 5, 1925. His district included representation for Scott County.

== Personal life and death ==
Geister resided in Shakopee, Minnesota. He died at the age of 65 in Scott County, Minnesota, on January 17, 1942.

Minnesota House of Representatives
Preceded by —	Member of the Minnesota House of Representatives from the 21st district 1923–1925	Succeeded by —
