= Jim Carlson (businessman) =

American businessman and politician

Jim Carlson is an American businessman and the Grassroots Party nominee for President of the United States in the 2012 election.

Carlson was the owner of Last Place on Earth, a head shop located in Duluth, Minnesota. In September 2011, the shop was raided by police for selling bath salts and synthetic marijuana. After the raid, Carlson filed a lawsuit to strike down Minnesota's ban on the substances. His suit was dismissed by the court in November 2011.

In June 2012, Carlson began a bid for U.S. presidency and received the presidential nomination of the Grassroots Party.

== Trial and Conviction in Federal Court ==
On September 16, 2012, in U.S. District Court in Minneapolis, Minnesota, Jim Carlson went to trial, facing 55 federal charges, including selling misbranded drugs and controlled substance analogues.

On October 7, 2013, he was found guilty of 51 of the 55 counts, and in 2014, he was sentenced to 17½ years. Jim Carlson's sentence was commuted by President Joe Biden in December of 2024.
