= Grassroots Party =

American political party advocating marijuana legalization

- Abbreviation: GRP
- Chairman: Tim Davis (1994–1998); Denny Lane (2000–2002)
- Founder: Tim Davis; Derrick Grimmer; Denny Lane; Robert Melamede; Oliver Steinberg; Chris Wright
- Founded: 1986
- Dissolved: 2012
- Preceded by: Youth International Party
- Succeeded by: Legal Marijuana Now Party
- Newspaper: The Canvas
- Ideology: Marijuana legalization Anti-Prohibitionism; Anti-War on drugs Left-libertarianism
- Colors: Green

The Grassroots Party was a political third party in the United States established in 1986 to oppose drug prohibition. The party shared many of the progressive values of the Farmer–Labor Party but with an emphasis on cannabis/hemp legalization issues, and the organization traced their roots to the Youth International Party of the 1960s.

The Grassroots Party was active in the U.S. states of Iowa, Minnesota, and Vermont. The party was most successful in Vermont, where they achieved major party qualification in 1996, a status which Vermont Grassroots retained for six years, until 2002.

== Platform ==
=== United States Bill of Rights ===
The permanent platform of the Grassroots Party was the Bill of Rights. Individual candidates' positions on issues varied from Libertarian to Green. All Grassroots candidates would end marijuana/hemp prohibition, thus re-legalizing cannabis for all its uses.

== U.S. presidential candidates ==
Jack Herer (1939–2010), author of The Emperor Wears No Clothes: Hemp & The Marijuana Conspiracy, was the Grassroots presidential candidate in 1988 and 1992.

Grassroots Party ran candidates in every presidential election from 1988 to 2000.

In 1996, the Grassroots Party of Minnesota nominated Dennis Peron in the presidential election. In 2000, the Grassroots Party of Vermont nominated Denny Lane as their presidential candidate.

In 2012, the Grassroots Party nominated Minnesota businessman Jim Carlson as their presidential candidate.

=== Results in presidential elections ===
Year	Image	Candidate	Image	VP candidate	Ballot access	Popular votes	Percentage
1988		Jack Herer		Dana Beal	MN	1,949	0.00%
1992		Jack Herer		Derrick Grimmer	MN, IA	3,875	0.00%
1996		Dennis Peron		Arlin Troutt	MN, VT	5,378	0.01%
2000		Denny Lane		Dale Wilkinson	VT	1,044	0.00%
2012		Jim Carlson		George McMahon	MN	3,149	0.00%

== History ==
=== Early history ===
The Grassroots Party was established in Minnesota in 1986, by Tim Davis, Derrick Grimmer, Oliver Steinberg, and Chris Wright, as an independent political party that focused on marijuana legalization. Derrick Grimmer, Ph.D., ran for Minnesota Attorney General in 1986. Grimmer received 16,394 votes.

Founding member Oliver Steinberg, who was a Republican candidate for US Congress in 1984, had a background of violence discrediting the peace movement in the 1970s. Steinberg was the Grassroots candidate for Lieutenant Governor in 1990.

The Grassroots Party of Minnesota (GRP) ran a full slate of statewide candidates in 1994 and won more votes than all other third parties in Minnesota combined. The Vermont Grassroots Party was formed in 1994.

Russell Bentley, a party candidate for US Senate in 1990 and US Congress in 1992 and GRP board member, was arrested on marijuana smuggling charges in 1996. Bentley was sentenced to five years in federal prison.

=== Independent Grassroots ===
In Minnesota in 1996 the Grassroots Party split, forming Independent Grassroots for one election cycle. John Birrenbach was the Independent Grassroots presidential candidate and George McMahon was the vice-presidential candidate. Dan Vacek was the Independent Grassroots candidate for US Representative (MN District 4). In 1998, members of Independent Grassroots established the Legal Marijuana Now political party.

== Minnesota ==
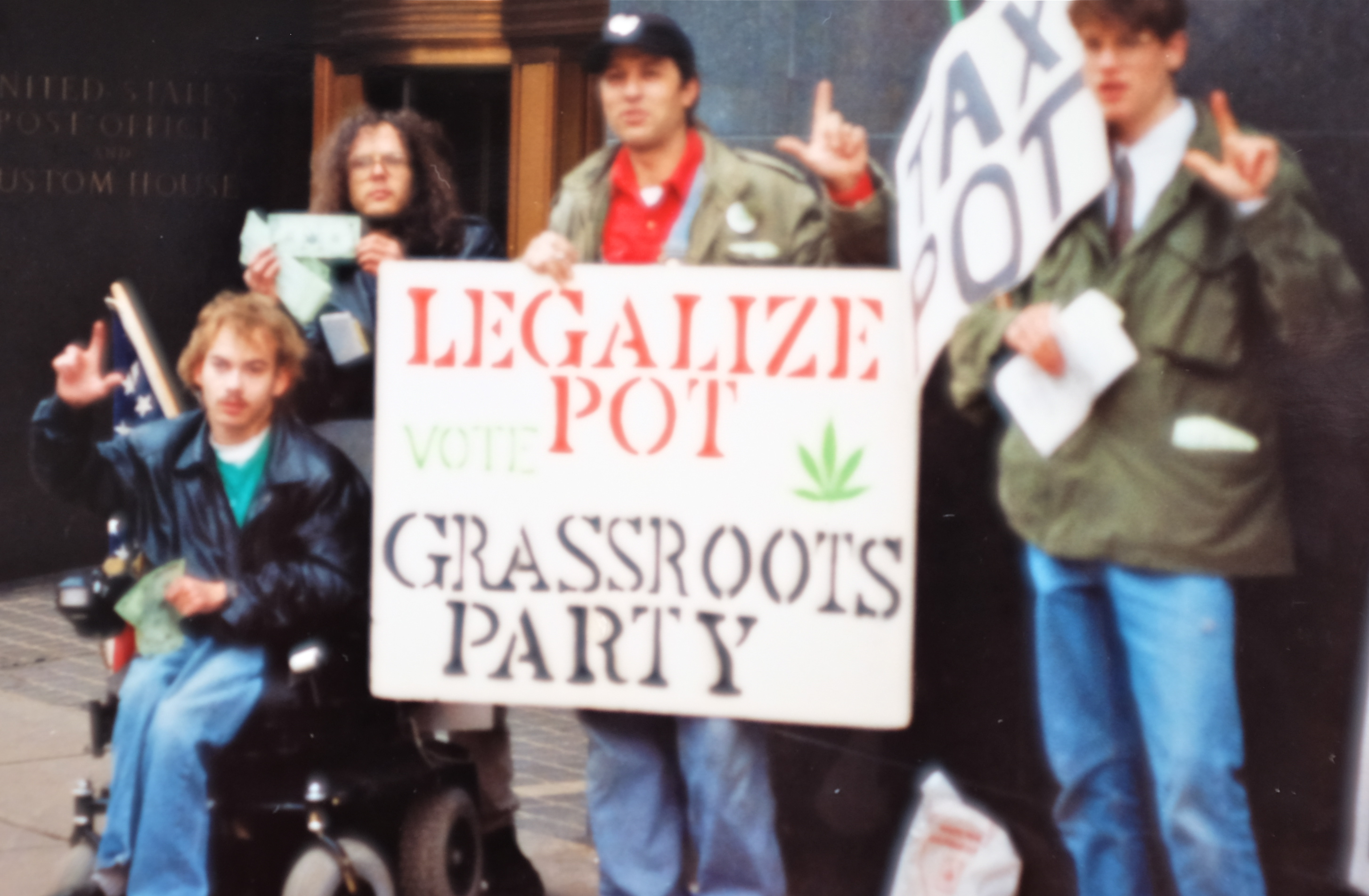
Minnesota Grassroots Party in Saint Paul on April 15, 1991

=== Gubernatorial candidates ===
In 1990, Ross Culverhouse, a computer programmer and Vietnam veteran was the Grassroots gubernatorial candidate. Oliver Steinberg was the party's candidate for Lieutenant Governor. Culverhouse received 17,176 votes.

Will Shetterly, a science-fiction writer and actor, ran for governor of Minnesota in 1994. He placed third out of six candidates.

=== Results in Minnesota gubernatorial elections ===
Year	Office	Candidate	Lieutenant Governor candidate	Popular votes	Percentage
1990	MN Governor	Ross Culverhouse	Oliver Steinberg	17,176	0.96%
1994	MN Governor	Will Shetterly	Tim Davis	20,785	1.20%
1998	MN Governor	Chris Wright	Darrell Paulsen	1,727	0.10%
2010	MN Governor	Chris Wright	Edwin H. Engelmann	7,516	0.36%

=== Minnesota elections ===
In 2000, the party nominated David Daniels, an African American playwright/performance artist from Minneapolis, as candidate for the United States Senate. Daniels had a very small campaign budget and was only invited to speak at some events broadcast on Minnesota Public Radio and Twin Cities Public Television. On election day, Daniels received 21,447 votes.

In 2002, Grassroots Party co-founder and candidate, Tim Davis, joined the Green Party. Davis returned to the Grassroots Party and ran for United States Senator in 2012. Davis, in 2020, became chairperson of the Legal Marijuana Now Party Minnesota chapter.

=== 2010–2014 ===
In 2010, Grassroots candidate Chris Wright was on the ballot in the governor's election.

The last Grassroots Party candidates ran in Minnesota, in 2012.

Steinberg and Wright, in 2014, formed the Minnesota Grassroots–Legalize Cannabis Party. Davis and the rest of the Grassroots Party, from 2014 to 2016, merged into the Minnesota Legal Marijuana Now Party.

=== After 2014 ===
In 2023, Grassroots Party founder Oliver Steinberg testified before the Minnesota Senate Public Safety Committee, in favor of Senate File 73 to create a regulated commercial cannabis market in the state. Some scholars have credited Minnesota's marijuana political parties, including GRP, for the state Democratic Party championing cannabis legalization after 2016.

=== Results in Minnesota state elections ===
Year	Office	Candidate	Popular votes	Percentage
1986	MN Attorney General	Derrick Grimmer	16,394	1.17%
1990	MN Secretary of State	Candice Sjostrom	43,812	2.48%
1990	MN Treasurer	Colleen Bonniwell	84,919	4.94%
1990	MN Senator 58	Eric Anderson	1,797	7.88%
1990	MN Representative 59B	Tim Davis	755	5.56%
1990	MN Representative 60A	Spencer Orman	477	7.29%
1992	MN Senator 59	Dale Wilkinson	2,179	7.05%
1994	MN Secretary of State	Dale Wilkinson	54,009	3.12%
1994	MN Attorney General	Dean Amundson	69,776	4.17%
1994	MN Auditor	Steven Anderson	80,811	4.79%
1994	MN Treasurer	Colleen Bonniwell	84,486	5.20%
1998	MN Representative 59A	Dale Wilkinson	1,270	9.66%

=== Results in federal elections ===
Year	Office	Candidate	Popular votes	Percentage
1988	US Senator	Derrick Grimmer	9,016	0.43%
1988	US Representative 5	Chris Wright	268	0.11%
1990	US Senator	Russell Bentley	29,820	1.65%
1992	US Representative 3	Dwight Fellman	9,164	2.91%
1992	US Representative 4	Dan Vacek	4,418	1.59%
1992	US Representative 5	Russell Bentley	6,786	2.24%
1994	US Senator	Candice Sjostrom	15,920	0.90%
1994	US Representative 4	Dan Vacek	6,211	2.94%
1996	US Senator	Tim Davis	14,139	6.48%
1996	US Representative 4	Phil Willkie	3,615	1.41%
1996	US Representative 5	Erika Anderson	13,102	5.33%
2000	US Senator	David Daniels	21,447	0.89%
2012	US Senator	Tim Davis	30,532	1.07%

== Iowa ==
Derrick Grimmer, Ph.D., a founding member of the Grassroots Party, moved from Minnesota to Iowa in 1988 and formed the Grassroots Party of Iowa. Grimmer ran for Iowa State Treasurer in 1990 and received 15,745 votes and he ran for U.S. House of Representatives (IA District 3) in 1994 and received 2,282 votes.

=== Results in Iowa state elections ===
Year	Office	Candidate	Popular votes	Percentage
1990	IA Treasurer	Derrick Grimmer	15,745	1.76%
1990	IA Secretary of Agriculture	Richard Bychowski	16,138	1.80%

=== Results in federal elections ===
Year	Office	Candidate	Popular votes	Percentage
1994	US Representative 3	Derrick Grimmer	2,282	1.18%
1994	US Representative 4	William Oviatt	803	0.38%

== Vermont ==
=== Gubernatorial candidates ===
The Vermont Grassroots Party formed in 1994. Dennis Lane was their candidate for Governor of Vermont in 1994, and 1996. Bill Coleman ran for Lieutenant Governor in 1996, and again in 1998.

Joel Williams was the Vermont Grassroots nominee for Governor in 1998, and 2000.

=== Results in Vermont gubernatorial elections ===
Year	Office	Candidate	Popular votes	Percentage
1994	Vermont Governor	Dennis Lane	2,118	1.0%
1996	Vermont Governor	Dennis Lane	3,667	1.4%
1996	Lieutenant Governor	Bill Coleman	5,296	2.1%
1998	Vermont Governor	Joel Williams	3,305	1.5%
1998	Lieutenant Governor	Bill Coleman	3,913	1.8%
2000	Vermont Governor	Joel Williams	1,359	0.5%
2000	Lieutenant Governor	Tom Beer	8,776	3.1%
2002	Vermont Governor	Patricia Hejny	771	0.4%
2002	Lieutenant Governor	Sally Ann Jones	4,310	1.9%

=== Vermont elections ===
In 1994, in addition to Governor, Vermont Grassroots ran candidates for U.S. Senator, U.S. Representative, Auditor of Accounts, and Attorney General. Robert Melamede was Vermont Grassroots nominee for U.S. Senator, in 1994, and again in 1998.

In 1996, genetic researcher and microbiologist Melamede, whose views promoting the curative properties of cannabis put him at odds with mainstream academia, was Grassroots candidate for U.S. Representative. Vermont Grassroots again ran a slate of candidates including Governor, Lieutenant Governor, U.S. Representative, Attorney General, Auditor of Accounts, State Treasurer, and Secretary of State.

Three Vermont Grassroots candidates won five percent or more of the popular vote in the 1996 election, qualifying the Grassroots Party for recognized major party status in Vermont.

In 1998 Vermont Grassroots ran a slate of candidates including gubernatorial candidate Joel Williams who received 3,305 votes (1.5%), and U.S. Senate candidate Melamede who received 2,459 votes (1.1%). Matthew Mulligan received 3,464 votes (1.6%) for U.S. Representative; Randy Bushey got 12,312 votes (6%) for State Treasurer; Steven Saetta got 6,345 votes (3%) for Auditor of Accounts; Dennis "Denny" Lane received 8,347 votes (3.9%) for Secretary of State and Sandy "Wells" Ward got 17,954 votes (8.8%) for Attorney General.

In 2000 the Vermont Grassroots Party ran a slate of candidates with Ward leading the ticket as candidate for Attorney General, receiving 38,713 votes, or 14.7% of the popular vote.

The Grassroots Party of Vermont fielded candidates representing a mixture of liberal and libertarian views for over a decade. The Vermont Grassroots Party dissolved after 2002.

In 2002 one of the Vermont Grassroots state leaders, Joel Williams, became a member of the Libertarian Party of Vermont. The Vermont Marijuana Party was formed in 2002 by Loretta Nall and Cris Ericson.

Vermont Grassroots Party ran a full slate, including gubernatorial candidates, in 2002. Teresa Bouchard led the way as candidate for State Treasurer with 10,757 votes (4.8%).

=== Results in Vermont state elections ===
Year	Office	Candidate	Popular votes	Percentage
1994	VT Auditor	Pamela Zarra Redden	7,239	3.7%
1994	VT Attorney General	Ted Talcott	7,062	3.5%
1996	VT Treasurer	Randy Bushey	16,671	7.0%
1996	VT Secretary of State	Jimmy De Pierro	17,283	7.4%
1996	VT Auditor	James Sweet	11,134	4.7%
1996	VT Attorney General	Tom Kingston	14,443	6.1%
1998	VT Treasurer	Randy Bushey	12,312	6.2%
1998	VT Secretary of State	Dennis Lane	8,347	4.0%
1998	VT Auditor	Steven Saetta	6,345	3.1%
1998	VT Attorney General	Sandy Ward	17,954	8.9%
2000	VT Attorney General	Sandy Ward	39,713	14.7%
2002	VT Treasurer	Claude Bouchard	10,757	4.8%
2002	VT Secretary of State	Tina Thompson	7,166	3.2%
2002	VT Auditor	Lynn Appleby	8,172	3.7%
2002	VT Attorney General	Mann Ward	6,307	2.8%

=== Results in federal elections ===
Year	Office	Candidate	Popular votes	Percentage
1994	US Senator	Bob Melamede	1,416	0.7%
1994	US Representative	Jack Rogers	2,664	1.3%
1996	US Representative	Robert Melamede	1,350	0.5%
1998	US Senator	Bob Melamede	2,459	1.1%
1998	US Representative	Matthew Mulligan	3,464	1.6%
2000	US Senator	Billy Greer	4,889	1.7%
2000	US Representative	Jack Rogers	4,799	1.7%
2002	US Representative	Fawn Skinner	2,344	1.0%

== California ==
In 2016, musician and martial artist Marvin Sotelo ran for U.S. House of Representatives in California's 40th congressional district as a Grassroots Party candidate. In California the top two vote-getters in the primary advance to the general election. Sotelo did not make it onto the ballot.

== Publications ==
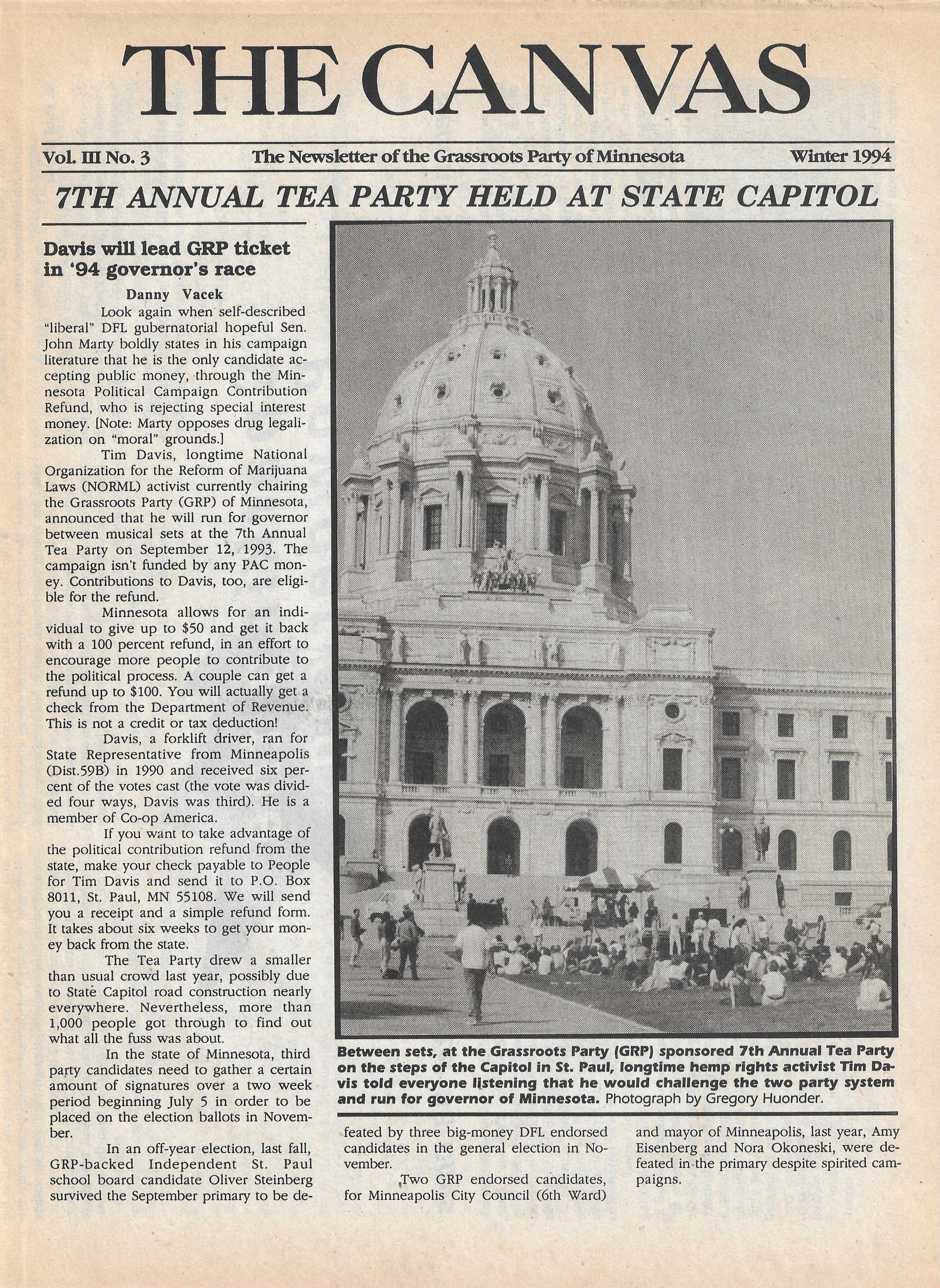
The Canvas, Winter 1994

=== The Canvas ===
The Canvas, the newsletter of the Grassroots Party of Minnesota, was published quarterly from 1991 until 1996. It reached a circulation of 5,000 printed copies.

The name of The Canvas was inspired by Webster's Dictionary definition of the word, which literally means "hempen."

From 1991 to 1994, The Canvas newsletter was designed and edited by Dan Vacek. During 1992, The Canvas was co-edited by Roger Gibian. In 1994–1995, Will Shetterly edited and produced The Canvas for several issues. In 1996, an issue of the newsletter was edited by Steven Anderson, and the last issue, published for the 1996 elections, was edited by Tim Davis.

== See also ==
- Cannabis political parties of the United States
