= Minnesota's 4th congressional district =

U.S. House district for Minnesota

Coordinates: 45°00′10″N 92°58′38″W

- Interactive map of district boundaries since January 3, 2023
- Representative: Betty McCollum; DFL–Saint Paul
- Area: 202 mi^{2} (520 km^{2})
- Distribution: 97.21% urban; 2.79% rural
- Population (2025): 708,503
- Median household income: $95,858
- Ethnicity: 62.2% White; 13.8% Asian; 11.1% Black; 7.4% Hispanic; 4.6% Two or more races; 0.9% other
- Cook PVI: D+18

Minnesota's 4th congressional district covers nearly all of Ramsey County and part of Washington County. It includes all of Saint Paul and most of its northern and eastern suburbs, including Woodbury, Blaine, Roseville, and Maplewood. The district is solidly Democratic, with a CPVI of D+18. It is currently represented by Betty McCollum of the Minnesota Democratic-Farmer-Labor Party (DFL). The DFL has held the seat without interruption since 1949 and all but one term (1947–1949) since the merger of the Democratic and Farmer-Labor Parties.

One of the most diverse congressional districts in Minnesota, the 4th district has the second-largest immigrant population of Minnesota's congressional districts, at 15% of the population. The largest countries of origin are Laos, Thailand, Myanmar, Mexico, India, Ethiopia, and Somalia, with immigrant populations largely concentrated in Saint Paul. The 4th district has the highest percentage of Hmong residents of any district in the United States, at 6% of the population.

== Recent election results from statewide races ==
Year	Office	Results
2003–2013 Boundaries
2008	President	Obama 63% - 35%
2008	Senate	Franken 49% - 37%
2010	Governor	Dayton 51% - 36%
2010	Secretary of State	Ritchie 58% - 38%
2010	Auditor	Otto 57% - 38%
2010	Attorney General	Swanson 61% - 34%
2013–2023 Boundaries
2012	President	Obama 62% - 35%
2012	Senate	Klobuchar 71% - 25%
2014	Senate	Franken 62% - 35%
2014	Governor	Dayton 59% - 36%
2014	Secretary of State	Simon 56% - 37%
2014	Auditor	Otto 61% - 31%
2014	Attorney General	Swanson 60% - 31%
2016	President	Clinton 61% - 30%
2018	Senate (Reg.)	Klobuchar 71% - 25%
2018	Senate (Spec.)	Smith 65% - 31%
2018	Governor	Walz 66% - 30%
2018	Secretary of State	Simon 65% - 31%
2018	Auditor	Blaha 61% - 31%
2018	Attorney General	Ellison 61% - 33%
2020	President	Biden 68% - 30%
2020	Senate	Smith 62% - 30%
2023–2033 Boundaries
2022	Governor	Walz 68% - 29%
2022	Secretary of State	Simon 70% - 30%
2022	Auditor	Blaha 61% - 32%
2022	Attorney General	Ellison 66% - 34%
2024	President	Harris 66% - 31%
2024	Senate	Klobuchar 70% - 26%
2026	Senate	Flanagan 70% - 28%
2026	Governor	Klobuchar 71% - 26%
2026	Secretary of State	Simon 70% - 26%
2026	Auditor	Filipovich 69% - 28%
2026	Attorney General	Ellison 71% - 29%

== Composition ==
For the 118th and successive Congresses (based on redistricting following the 2020 census), the district contains all or portions of the following counties, townships, and municipalities:

Ramsey County (18)

Arden Hills, Blaine, Falcon Heights, Gem Lake, Lauderdale, Little Canada, Maplewood, Mounds View, New Brighton, North Oaks, North St. Paul, Roseville, Saint Paul, Shoreview, Spring Lake Park (part; also 5th; shared with Anoka County), Vadnais Heights, White Bear Lake, White Bear Township

Washington County (21)

Afton, Bayport, Baytown Township, Birchwood Village, Dellwood, Grant, Lake Elmo, Lakeland, Lakeland Shores, Lake St. Croix Beach, Landfall, Mahtomedi, Oakdale, Oak Park Heights, Pine Springs, St. Marys Point, Stillwater, Stillwater Township (part; also 8th), West Lakeland Township, Willernie, Woodbury (part; also 2nd)

== List of members representing the district ==
Member	Party	Years	Cong ress	Electoral history	Location
District created March 4, 1883
William D. Washburn (Minneapolis)	Republican	March 4, 1883 – March 3, 1885	48th	Redistricted from the 3rd district and re-elected in 1882. Lost renomination.	Hennepin (Minneapolis)
John Gilfillan (Minneapolis)	Republican	March 4, 1885 – March 3, 1887	49th	Elected in 1884. Lost re-election.	Hennepin (Minneapolis)
Edmund Rice (Saint Paul)	Democratic	March 4, 1887 – March 3, 1889	50th	Elected in 1886. Lost re-election.	Hennepin (Minneapolis)
Samuel Snider (Minneapolis)	Republican	March 4, 1889 – March 3, 1891	51st	Elected in 1888. Lost re-election.	Hennepin (Minneapolis)
James Castle (Stillwater)	Democratic	March 4, 1891 – March 3, 1893	52nd	Elected in 1890. Lost re-election.	Chisago Isanti Kannebec Ramsey Washington
Andrew Kiefer (Saint Paul)	Republican	March 4, 1893 – March 3, 1897	53rd 54th	Elected in 1892. Re-elected in 1894. Retired.	Chisago Isanti Kannebec Ramsey Washington
Frederick Stevens (Saint Paul)	Republican	March 4, 1897 – March 3, 1915	55th 56th 57th 58th 59th 60th 61st 62nd 63rd	Elected in 1896. Re-elected in 1898. Re-elected in 1900. Re-elected in 1902. Re-elected in 1904. Re-elected in 1906. Re-elected in 1908. Re-elected in 1910. Re-elected in 1912. Lost re-election.	Chisago Ramsey Washington
Carl Van Dyke (Saint Paul)	Democratic	March 4, 1915 – May 20, 1919	64th 65th 66th	Elected in 1914. Re-elected in 1916. Re-elected in 1918. Died.	Ramsey
Vacant		May 20, 1919 – July 1, 1919	66th		Ramsey
Oscar Keller (Saint Paul)	Republican	July 1, 1919 – March 3, 1927	66th 67th 68th 69th	Elected to finish Van Dyke's term. Re-elected in 1920. Re-elected in 1922. Re-elected in 1924. Lost renomination.	Ramsey
Melvin Maas (Saint Paul)	Republican	March 4, 1927 – March 3, 1933	70th 71st 72nd	Elected in 1926. Re-elected in 1928. Re-elected in 1930. Redistricted to the at-large district and lost renomination.	Ramsey
District inactive		March 4, 1933 – January 3, 1935	73rd	All members elected at-large	
Melvin Maas (Saint Paul)	Republican	January 3, 1935 – January 3, 1945	74th 75th 76th 77th 78th	Elected in 1934. Re-elected in 1936. Re-elected in 1938. Re-elected in 1940. Re-elected in 1942. Lost re-election.	Ramsey
Frank Starkey (Saint Paul)	Democratic (DFL)	January 3, 1945 – January 3, 1947	79th	Elected in 1944. Lost re-election.	Ramsey
Edward Devitt (Saint Paul)	Republican	January 3, 1947 – January 3, 1949	80th	Elected in 1946. Lost re-election.	Ramsey
Eugene McCarthy (Saint Paul)	Democratic (DFL)	January 3, 1949 – January 3, 1959	81st 82nd 83rd 84th 85th	Elected in 1948. Re-elected in 1950. Re-elected in 1952. Re-elected in 1954. Re-elected in 1956. Retired to run for U.S. senator.	Ramsey
Joseph Karth (Saint Paul)	Democratic (DFL)	January 3, 1959 – January 3, 1977	86th 87th 88th 89th 90th 91st 92nd 93rd 94th	Elected in 1958. Re-elected in 1960. Re-elected in 1962. Re-elected in 1964. Re-elected in 1966. Re-elected in 1968. Re-elected in 1970. Re-elected in 1972. Re-elected in 1974. Retired.	Ramsey Washington
Bruce Vento (Saint Paul)	Democratic (DFL)	January 3, 1977 – October 10, 2000	95th 96th 97th 98th 99th 100th 101st 102nd 103rd 104th 105th 106th	Elected in 1976. Re-elected in 1978. Re-elected in 1980. Re-elected in 1982. Re-elected in 1984. Re-elected in 1986. Re-elected in 1988. Re-elected in 1990. Re-elected in 1992. Re-elected in 1994. Re-elected in 1996. Re-elected in 1998. Announced retirement, then died.	Ramsey Washington
Vacant		October 10, 2000 – January 3, 2001	106th		Ramsey Washington
Betty McCollum (Saint Paul)	Democratic (DFL)	January 3, 2001 – present	107th 108th 109th 110th 111th 112th 113th 114th 115th 116th 117th 118th 119th	Elected in 2000. Re-elected in 2002. Re-elected in 2004. Re-elected in 2006. Re-elected in 2008. Re-elected in 2010. Re-elected in 2012. Re-elected in 2014. Re-elected in 2016. Re-elected in 2018. Re-elected in 2020. Re-elected in 2022. Re-elected in 2024. Re-elected in 2026.	Ramsey Washington

== Recent election results ==
Graph of election results in Minnesota's 4th congressional district (some minor parties omitted)

Year	Democratic	Republican	Other
1918	√ Carl Van Dyke: 62.0%	Walter Mallory: 38.0%	
1920	Thomas J. Brady: 34.2%	√ Oscar Keller: 58.7% Carl W. Cummins: 7.1%	
1922	Paul E. Doty: 35.6%	√ Oscar Keller: 58.7%	O. J. McCartney (Independent): 5.7%
1924	Daniel W. Lawler: 36.8%	√ Oscar Keller: 47.7%	Julius F. Emme (Farmer-Labor) 15.4%
1926	Charles C. Kolars: 15.4%	√ Melvin Maas: 54.3%	Thomas V. Sullivan (Farmer-Labor) 41.0%
1928	John P. J. Dolan: 28.6%	√ Melvin Maas: 36%	Howard Y. Williams (Farmer-Labor): 21.0% Fred A. Snyder (Independent): 14.0% Maurice Powers (Independent): 0.5%
1930	Frank Munger: 9.0%	√ Melvin Maas: 66.5%	Claus V. Hammerstrom (Farmer-Labor): 22.1% A. W. Anderson (Independent): 2.3%
1932	(Congress elected on a general ticket after state legislature failed to redraw districts after 1930 census)		
1934	John J. McDonough: 23.4%	√ Melvin Maas: 36.8%	A. E. Smith (Farmer-Labor): 29.4% Charles J. Andre (Independent): 9.9% Thomas Tracy (Independent): 0.5%
1936	A. B. C. Doherty: 22.9%	√ Melvin Maas: 38.3%	Howard Y. Williams (Farmer-Labor): 38.0% Otis A. Luce (Independent): 0.7%
1938	A. B. C. Doherty: 11.1%	√ Melvin Maas: 53.1%	Howard Y. Williams (Farmer-Labor): 35.8%
1940	Willard J. Moran: 12.9%	√ Melvin Maas: 58.8%	George L. Siegel (Farmer-Labor): 28.2%
1942	Edward K. Delaney: 9.8%	√ Melvin Maas: 65.1%	William Mahoney (Farmer-Labor): 24.2%; Rose Tillotson (Communist Party USA) 0.9%
1944	√ Frank Starkey: 51.8%	Melvin Maas: 48.2%	
1946	Frank Starkey: 47.2%	√ Edward Devitt: 51.5%	Dorothy Schultz (Independent): 1.3%
1948	√ Eugene McCarthy: 59.4%	Edward Devitt: 40.6%	
1950	√ Eugene McCarthy: 60.4%	Ward Fleming: 39.6%	
1952	√ Eugene McCarthy: 61.7%	Roger G. Kennedy: 38.3%	
1954	√ Eugene McCarthy: 63.0%	Richard C. Hansen: 37.0%	
1956	√ Eugene McCarthy: 64.1%	Edward C. Slettedahl: 35.9%	
1958	√ Joseph Karth: 56.4%	Frank S. Farrell: 43.6%	
1960	√ Joseph Karth: 61.0%	Joseph J. Mitchell: 39.0%	
1962	√ Joseph Karth: 59.5%	Harry Strong: 40.5%	
1964	√ Joseph Karth: 72.3%	John M. Drexler: 27.1%	Write-in: 0.7%
1966	√ Joseph Karth: 53.4%	Stephen Maxwell: 46.6%	
1968	√ Joseph Karth: 61.3%	Emery Barrette: 38.7%	
1970	√ Joseph Karth: 74.2%	Frank L. Loss:) 25.8%	
1972	√ Joseph Karth: 72.4%	Steve Thompson: 27.6%	
1974	√ Joseph Karth: 76.0%	Joseph A. Rheinberger: 24.0%	
1976	√ Bruce Vento: 66.4%	Andrew Engebretson: 29.8%	Alan W. Uhl (Independent): 1.5% Thomas F. Piotrowski (Libertarian): 1.4% Ralph Schwartz (Socialist Workers): 0.9%
1978	√ Bruce Vento: 58.0%	John Berg: 42.0%	
1980	√ Bruce Vento: 58.5%	John Berg: 40.5%	James Kendrick (Socialist Workers) 1.0%
1982	√ Bruce Vento: 73.2%	Bill James: 26.8%	
1984	√ Bruce Vento: 73.5%	Mary Jane Rachner: 25.2%	Peter Brandli (Socialist Workers) 1.3%
1986	√ Bruce Vento: 72.9%	Harold Stassen 27.1%	
1988	√ Bruce Vento: 72.4%	Ian Maitland: 26.8%	Natasha Terlexis (Socialist Workers) 0.7%
1990	√ Bruce Vento: 64.7%	Ian Maitland: 35.1%	
1992	√ Bruce Vento: 57.6%	Ian Maitland: 37.6%	James Willess (Independent): 2.4% Dan R. Vacek (Grassroots) 1.6% Lynn Marvin Johnson (Natural Law) 1.3% Jo Rothenberg (Socialist Workers) 0.4%
1994	√ Bruce Vento: 54.7%	Dennis Newinski: 41.8%	Dan R. Vacek (Grassroots): 2.9%
1996	√ Bruce Vento: 57.02%	Dennis Newinski: 36.80%	Richard Gibbons (Reform): 3.64% Phil Willkie (Grassroots): 1.41% Dan Vacek (Grassroots): 1.05%
1998	√ Bruce Vento: 53.7%	Dennis Newinski: 39.8%	Dan R. Vacek (Legal Marijuana Now): 2.4% Carol Simmons Schulstad (Minnesota Taxpayers): 1.9% Michael A. Neitzel (Libertarian): 1.2% Heather Wood (Socialist Workers): 0.9%
2000	√ Betty McCollum: 48.04%	Linda Runbeck: 30.89%	Tom Foley (Independence): 20.59%; Nicholas Skrivanek (Constitution): 0.47%
2002	√ Betty McCollum: 62.22%	Clyde Billington: 33.91%	Steve J. Raskiewicz (Green): 3.75%
2004	√ Betty McCollum: 57.5%	Patrice Bataglia: 33.2%	Peter Vento (Independence): 9.2%
2006	√ Betty McCollum: 69.5%	Obi Sium: 30.2%	
2008	√ Betty McCollum: 68.4%	Ed Matthews: 31.3%	
2010	√ Betty McCollum: 59.2%	Teresa Collett: 34.7%	Steve Carlson (Independence): 6.1%
2012	√ Betty McCollum: 62.27%	Tony Hernandez: 31.51%	Steve Carlson (Independence): 6.07%
2014	√ Betty McCollum: 61.2%	Sharna Wahlgren: 32.9%	Dave Thomas (Independence): 5.8%; Write-ins: 0.1%
2016	√ Betty McCollum: 57.8%	Greg Ryan: 34.4%	Susan Pendergast Sindt (Legal Marijuana Now): 7.7%
2018	√ Betty McCollum: 66.0%	Greg Ryan: 29.7%	Susan Pendergast Sindt (Legal Marijuana Now): 4.2%
2020	√ Betty McCollum: 63.2%	Gene Rechtzigel: 29.0%	Susan Sindt (Grassroots): 7.6%

=== 2022 ===
2022 Minnesota's 4th congressional district Democratic primary
Party	Candidate	Votes	%
Democratic (DFL)	Betty McCollum	58,043	83.40
Democratic (DFL)	Amane Badhasso	10,557	15.17
Democratic (DFL)	Fasil Moghul	997	1.43
Total votes		69,597	100.0

2022 Minnesota's 4th district congressional election
Party	Candidate	Votes	%
Democratic (DFL)	Betty McCollum	200,055	67.59
Republican	May Lor Xiong	95,493	32.26
Total votes		295,548	100.0
Democratic (DFL) hold			

=== 2024 ===
2024 Minnesota's 4th congressional district election
Party	Candidate	Votes	%
Democratic (DFL)	Betty McCollum (incumbent)	242,802	67.2
Republican	May Lor Xiong	117,618	32.6
Write-in		623	0.2
Total votes		361,043	100.0
Democratic (DFL) hold			

== Historical district boundaries ==
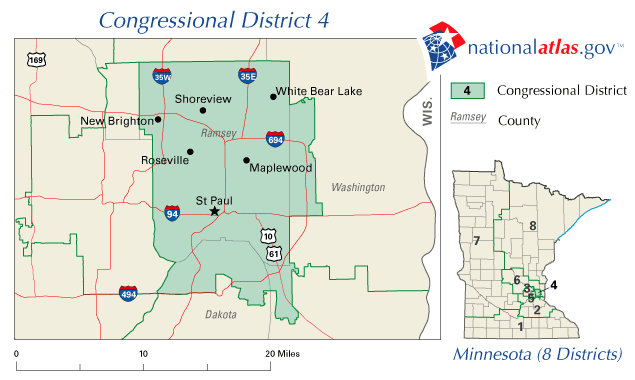
2003–2013

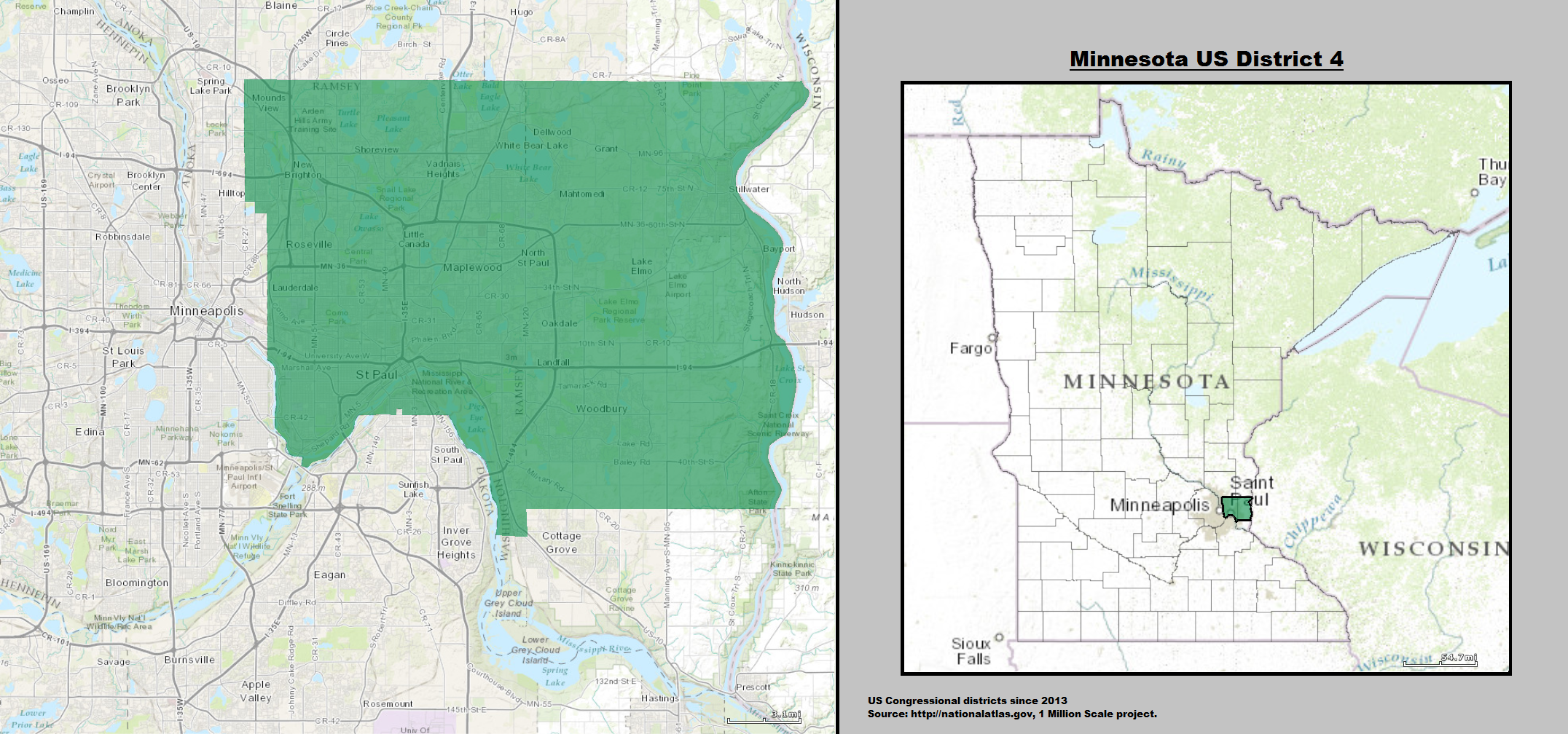
2013–2023

== See also ==
- Minnesota's congressional districts
- List of United States congressional districts
