= 2026 Minnesota elections =

2026 Minnesota general election
- November 3, 2026
- Turnout: 65.16%

A general election was held in the U.S. state of Minnesota on November 3, 2026. All of Minnesota's executive officers were up for election, as well as one United States Senate seat, Minnesota's eight seats in the United States House of Representatives, all the seats in the Minnesota Senate and the Minnesota House of Representatives, several judicial seats, and several seats for local offices. Primary elections to nominate major party candidates and several judicial and local primary elections were held on August 11, 2026.

The Minnesota Democratic–Farmer–Labor Party won all statewide offices, five of the state's eight seats in the United States House of Representatives, and majorities in both state legislative houses.

== Federal elections ==
=== United States Senate ===
Minnesota's Class 2 seat in the United States Senate was up for election. Incumbent Tina Smith did not run for re-election. Peggy Flanagan (DFL) was elected.

This was the first open race in this seat since 2002. (Note: Paul Wellstone, the incumbent in 2002, was running for a third term, but he was killed in a plane crash eleven days before the election.)

=== United States House of Representatives ===
Minnesota's eight seats in the United States House of Representatives were up for election. The DFL and the Republicans held four seats each before the election. Incumbents won in all districts besides the 1st District, where Jake Johnson (DFL) leads incumbent Brad Finstad by around 300 votes before a recount.

== State elections ==
=== State executive elections ===
==== Governor ====
Incumbent DFL Governor Tim Walz initially ran for re-election but withdrew his candidacy in January in 2026. Minnesota does not have gubernatorial term limits. Amy Klobuchar was elected.

==== Secretary of state ====
Incumbent DFL secretary of state Steve Simon won re-election.

==== State auditor ====
Incumbent DFL State Auditor Julie Blaha did not seek re-election. Zack Filipovich was elected.

==== Attorney general ====
Incumbent DFL attorney general Keith Ellison won re-election.

=== State legislative elections ===
==== Polling ====
Poll source	Date(s) administered	Sample size (Note: Key: A – all adults RV – registered voters LV – likely voters V – unclear)	Margin of error	Republican	DFL	Split control	Undecided
Mason-Dixon Polling & Strategy (Note: Poll sponsored by KARE & The Minnesota Star Tribune)	October 5–7, 2026	800 (LV)	± 3.5%	39%	47%	12%	2%

==== Minnesota Senate ====
All 67 seats in the Minnesota Senate were up for election in 2026. The DFL gained around 5 seats. Before the election, the DFL held a majority of 34 seats, with the Republican Party holding 33. The DFL won 39 to 41 seats and the Republican Party won 26 to 28, subject to two recounts in which Republicans lead by close margins.

==== Minnesota House of Representatives ====
All 134 seats in the Minnesota House of Representatives were up for election in 2026. The DFL gained nine to ten seats (pending a recount in one district), giving them a majority.

After the 2024 Minnesota House of Representatives election, the house was tied 67-67 between the Republican Party and the DFL; the 94th Minnesota Legislature began with a one-seat Republican majority due to a single vacancy.

=== Judicial elections ===
Two of Minnesota's seven supreme court justices were up for re-election in 2026. Both were re-elected.

== State Ballot Measure ==
An amendment to the Minnesota Constitution was considered in 2026. It was the only amendment to the state constitution offered this year. The amendment passed with 72.79% of the vote.

== Local elections ==
Elections for several subdivisions were held, including elections for counties, such as the 2026 Hennepin County Attorney election, municipalities, school districts, and hospital districts.

== Notes ==
Partisan clients
