= Minnesota's 5th congressional district =

U.S. House district for Minnesota

Coordinates: 44°58′52″N 93°17′39″W

- Interactive map of district boundaries since January 3, 2023
- Representative: Ilhan Omar; DFL–Minneapolis
- Area: 124 mi^{2} (320 km^{2})
- Distribution: 100% urban; 0% rural
- Population (2025): 714,546
- Median household income: $82,590
- Ethnicity: 59.9% White; 17.1% Black; 10.1% Hispanic; 6.1% Asian; 5.2% Two or more races; 1.0% Native American; 0.5% other
- Cook PVI: D+32

Minnesota's 5th congressional district is a geographically small urban and suburban congressional district in Minnesota. It covers eastern Hennepin County, including the entire city of Minneapolis, along with parts of Anoka and Ramsey counties. Besides Minneapolis, major cities in the district include Brooklyn Center, St. Louis Park, Richfield, Crystal, Robbinsdale, Golden Valley, New Hope, Fridley, and a small portion of Edina.

It was created in 1883, and was nicknamed the "Bloody Fifth" on account of its first election. The contest between Knute Nelson and Charles F. Kindred involved graft, intimidation, and election fraud at every turn. The Republican convention on July 12 in Detroit Lakes was compared to the historic Battle of the Boyne in Ireland. One hundred and fifty delegates fought over eighty seats. After a scuffle in the main conference center, the Kindred and Nelson campaigns nominated each of their candidates.

The district is strongly Democratic, with a Cook Partisan Voting Index (CPVI) of D+32 — by far the most Democratic district in the state. The 5th is also the most Democratic district in the Upper Midwest. The Minnesota Democratic–Farmer–Labor Party (DFL) has held the seat without interruption since 1963, and the Republicans have not tallied more than 40 percent of the vote in almost half a century. The 5th district is one of the most diverse in Minnesota; 16% of the district's residents are immigrants, the highest of any district in Minnesota, with the largest countries of origin being Somalia, Ethiopia, Mexico, India, Laos, Ecuador, and Liberia. The district also has the largest population of Somali Americans in the country, with Somalis making up 3% of the district's population.

The district is represented by Ilhan Omar, who is the first Somali–American to serve in the U.S. House of Representatives, and the first woman of color to represent Minnesota in that chamber. Omar, also an American Muslim, succeeded Keith Ellison, the first American Muslim to serve in Congress, after he was elected Minnesota attorney general.

== Recent election results from statewide races ==
Year	Office	Results
2008	President	Obama 74% - 24%
2008	Senate	Franken 61% - 25%
2010	Governor	Dayton 64% - 24%
2010	Secretary of State	Ritchie 70% - 26%
2010	Auditor	Otto 68% - 27%
2010	Attorney General	Swanson 72% - 23%
2012	President	Obama 74% - 24%
2012	Senate	Klobuchar 79% - 17%
2014	Senate	Franken 74% - 22%
2014	Governor	Dayton 71% - 23%
2014	Secretary of State	Simon 70% - 23%
2014	Auditor	Otto 70% - 20%
2014	Attorney General	Swanson 69% - 19%
2016	President	Clinton 73% - 18%
2018	Senate (Reg.)	Klobuchar 81% - 15%
2018	Senate (Spec.)	Smith 77% - 18%
2018	Governor	Walz 78% - 18%
2018	Secretary of State	Simon 78% - 18%
2018	Auditor	Blaha 73% - 19%
2018	Attorney General	Ellison 74% - 20%
2020	President	Biden 80% - 17%
2020	Senate	Smith 74% - 18%
2022	Governor	Walz 81% - 16%
2022	Secretary of State	Simon 83% - 17%
2022	Auditor	Blaha 76% - 18%
2022	Attorney General	Ellison 80% - 20%
2024	President	Harris 79% - 18%
2024	Senate	Klobuchar 82% - 15%
2026	Senate	Flanagan 83% - 15%
2026	Governor	Klobuchar 83% - 14%
2026	Secretary of State	Simon 83% - 14%
2026	Auditor	Filipovich 82% - 15%
2026	Attorney General	Ellison 83% - 16%

== Composition ==
For the 118th and successive Congresses (based on redistricting following the 2020 census), the district contains all or portions of the following counties, townships, and municipalities:

Anoka County (4)

Columbia Heights, Fridley, Hilltop, Spring Lake Park (part; also 4th; shared with Ramsey County)

Hennepin County (10)

Brooklyn Center, Crystal, Edina (part; also 3rd), Golden Valley, Minneapolis, New Hope, Richfield, Robbinsdale, St. Anthony (shared with Ramsey County), St. Louis Park

Ramsey County (1)

St. Anthony (shared with Hennepin County)

== List of members representing the district ==
Member	Party	Years	Cong ress	Electoral history	District location
District created March 4, 1883
Knute Nelson (Alexandria)	Republican	March 4, 1883 – March 3, 1889	48th 49th 50th	Elected in 1882. Re-elected in 1884. Re-elected in 1886. Retired.	1883–1893 [data missing]
Solomon Comstock (Moorhead)	Republican	March 4, 1889 – March 3, 1891	51st	Elected in 1888. Lost re-election.	1883–1893 [data missing]
Kittel Halvorson (North Fork)	Populist	March 4, 1891 – March 3, 1893	52nd	Elected in 1890. Lost re-election.	1883–1893 [data missing]
Loren Fletcher (Minneapolis)	Republican	March 4, 1893 – March 3, 1903	53rd 54th 55th 56th 57th	Elected in 1892. Re-elected in 1894. Re-elected in 1896. Re-elected in 1898. Re-elected in 1900. Lost re-election.	1893–1903 [data missing]
John Lind (Minneapolis)	Democratic	March 4, 1903 – March 3, 1905	58th	Elected in 1902. Retired.	1903–1913 [data missing]
Loren Fletcher (Minneapolis)	Republican	March 4, 1905 – March 3, 1907	59th	Elected in 1904. Retired.	1903–1913 [data missing]
Frank Nye (Minneapolis)	Republican	March 4, 1907 – March 3, 1913	60th 61st 62nd	Elected in 1906. Re-elected in 1908. Re-elected in 1910. Retired.	1903–1913 [data missing]
George Ross Smith (Minneapolis)	Republican	March 4, 1913 – March 3, 1917	63rd 64th	Elected in 1912. Re-elected in 1914. Lost re-election.	1913–1933 [data missing]
Ernest Lundeen (Minneapolis)	Republican	March 4, 1917 – March 3, 1919	65th	Elected in 1916. Lost renomination.	1913–1933 [data missing]
Walter Newton (Minneapolis)	Republican	March 4, 1919 – June 30, 1929	66th 67th 68th 69th 70th 71st	Elected in 1918. Re-elected in 1920. Re-elected in 1922. Re-elected in 1924. Re-elected in 1926. Re-elected in 1928. Resigned when appointed Secretary to President Herbert Hoover.	1913–1933 [data missing]
Vacant		June 30, 1929 – July 17, 1929	71st		1913–1933 [data missing]
William I. Nolan (Minneapolis)	Republican	July 17, 1929 – March 3, 1933	71st 72nd	Elected to finish Newton's term. Re-elected in 1930. Redistricted to the at-large district and lost re-election.	1913–1933 [data missing]
District inactive		March 4, 1933 – January 3, 1935	73rd	All representatives elected at-large on a general ticket.	
Theodore Christianson (Minneapolis)	Republican	January 3, 1935 – January 3, 1937	74th	Redistricted from the at-large district and re-elected in 1934. Retired to run for U.S. Senator.	1935–1943 [data missing]
Dewey Johnson (Minneapolis)	Farmer–Labor	January 3, 1937 – January 3, 1939	75th	Elected in 1936. Lost re-election.	1935–1943 [data missing]
Oscar Youngdahl (Minneapolis)	Republican	January 3, 1939 – January 3, 1943	76th 77th	Elected in 1938. Re-elected in 1940. Lost renomination.	1935–1943 [data missing]
Walter Judd (Minneapolis)	Republican	January 3, 1943 – January 3, 1963	78th 79th 80th 81st 82nd 83rd 84th 85th 86th 87th	Elected in 1942. Re-elected in 1944. Re-elected in 1946. Re-elected in 1948. Re-elected in 1950. Re-elected in 1952. Re-elected in 1954. Re-elected in 1956. Re-elected in 1958. Re-elected in 1960. Lost re-election.	1943–1953 [data missing]
Walter Judd (Minneapolis)	Republican	January 3, 1943 – January 3, 1963	78th 79th 80th 81st 82nd 83rd 84th 85th 86th 87th	Elected in 1942. Re-elected in 1944. Re-elected in 1946. Re-elected in 1948. Re-elected in 1950. Re-elected in 1952. Re-elected in 1954. Re-elected in 1956. Re-elected in 1958. Re-elected in 1960. Lost re-election.	1953–1963 [data missing]
Donald M. Fraser (Minneapolis)	Democratic (DFL)	January 3, 1963 – January 3, 1979	88th 89th 90th 91st 92nd 93rd 94th 95th	Elected in 1962. Re-elected in 1964. Re-elected in 1966. Re-elected in 1968. Re-elected in 1970. Re-elected in 1972. Re-elected in 1974. Re-elected in 1976. Retired to run for U.S. Senator.	1963–1973 [data missing]
Donald M. Fraser (Minneapolis)	Democratic (DFL)	January 3, 1963 – January 3, 1979	88th 89th 90th 91st 92nd 93rd 94th 95th	Elected in 1962. Re-elected in 1964. Re-elected in 1966. Re-elected in 1968. Re-elected in 1970. Re-elected in 1972. Re-elected in 1974. Re-elected in 1976. Retired to run for U.S. Senator.	1973–1983 [data missing]
Martin Olav Sabo (Minneapolis)	Democratic (DFL)	January 3, 1979 – January 3, 2007	96th 97th 98th 99th 100th 101st 102nd 103rd 104th 105th 106th 107th 108th 109th	Elected in 1978. Re-elected in 1980. Re-elected in 1982. Re-elected in 1984. Re-elected in 1986. Re-elected in 1988. Re-elected in 1990. Re-elected in 1992. Re-elected in 1994. Re-elected in 1996. Re-elected in 1998. Re-elected in 2000. Re-elected in 2002. Re-elected in 2004. Retired.	1973–1983 [data missing]
Martin Olav Sabo (Minneapolis)	Democratic (DFL)	January 3, 1979 – January 3, 2007	96th 97th 98th 99th 100th 101st 102nd 103rd 104th 105th 106th 107th 108th 109th	Elected in 1978. Re-elected in 1980. Re-elected in 1982. Re-elected in 1984. Re-elected in 1986. Re-elected in 1988. Re-elected in 1990. Re-elected in 1992. Re-elected in 1994. Re-elected in 1996. Re-elected in 1998. Re-elected in 2000. Re-elected in 2002. Re-elected in 2004. Retired.	1983–1993 [data missing]
Martin Olav Sabo (Minneapolis)	Democratic (DFL)	January 3, 1979 – January 3, 2007	96th 97th 98th 99th 100th 101st 102nd 103rd 104th 105th 106th 107th 108th 109th	Elected in 1978. Re-elected in 1980. Re-elected in 1982. Re-elected in 1984. Re-elected in 1986. Re-elected in 1988. Re-elected in 1990. Re-elected in 1992. Re-elected in 1994. Re-elected in 1996. Re-elected in 1998. Re-elected in 2000. Re-elected in 2002. Re-elected in 2004. Retired.	1993–2003 [data missing]
Martin Olav Sabo (Minneapolis)	Democratic (DFL)	January 3, 1979 – January 3, 2007	96th 97th 98th 99th 100th 101st 102nd 103rd 104th 105th 106th 107th 108th 109th	Elected in 1978. Re-elected in 1980. Re-elected in 1982. Re-elected in 1984. Re-elected in 1986. Re-elected in 1988. Re-elected in 1990. Re-elected in 1992. Re-elected in 1994. Re-elected in 1996. Re-elected in 1998. Re-elected in 2000. Re-elected in 2002. Re-elected in 2004. Retired.	2003–2013
Keith Ellison (Minneapolis)	Democratic (DFL)	January 3, 2007 – January 3, 2019	110th 111th 112th 113th 114th 115th	Elected in 2006. Re-elected in 2008. Re-elected in 2010. Re-elected in 2012. Re-elected in 2014. Re-elected in 2016. Retired to run for Attorney General of Minnesota.	2003–2013
Keith Ellison (Minneapolis)	Democratic (DFL)	January 3, 2007 – January 3, 2019	110th 111th 112th 113th 114th 115th	Elected in 2006. Re-elected in 2008. Re-elected in 2010. Re-elected in 2012. Re-elected in 2014. Re-elected in 2016. Retired to run for Attorney General of Minnesota.	2013–2023
Ilhan Omar (Minneapolis)	Democratic (DFL)	January 3, 2019 – present	116th 117th 118th 119th	Elected in 2018. Re-elected in 2020. Re-elected in 2022. Re-elected in 2024. Re-elected in 2026.	2013–2023
Ilhan Omar (Minneapolis)	Democratic (DFL)	January 3, 2019 – present	116th 117th 118th 119th	Elected in 2018. Re-elected in 2020. Re-elected in 2022. Re-elected in 2024. Re-elected in 2026.	2023–present

== Recent election results ==
=== 2002 ===
2002 Minnesota 5th congressional district election
Party	Candidate	Votes	%
Democratic (DFL)	Martin Sabo (Incumbent)	171,572	67
Republican	Daniel Mathias	66,271	25.9
Green	Tim Davis	17,825	7

=== 2004 ===
2004 Minnesota 5th congressional district election
Party	Candidate	Votes	%	±%
Democratic (DFL)	Martin Sabo (Incumbent)	218,434	69.7	+2.7%
Republican	Daniel Mathias	76,600	24.4	−1.5%
Green	Jay Pond	17,984	5.7	−1.3%

=== 2006 ===
Congressman Martin Sabo, DFL, retired after 26 years in the House. Keith Ellison, also a DFLer, replaced him. Although Ellison was endorsed by the DFL convention, four non-endorsed candidates ran strong campaigns against him in the DFL primary: Gail Dorfman, Mike Erlandson, Ember Reichgott Junge, and Jack Nelson Pallmeyer. Ellison won the primary with 41% of the vote. In the general election, he won with 56% of the vote against Jay Pond of the Green Party, Tammy Lee of the Independence Party, and Alan Fine of the Republican Party. Ellison was the first Muslim member of the U.S. Congress.

2006 Minnesota 5th congressional district election
Party	Candidate	Votes	%	±%
Democratic (DFL)	Keith Ellison	136,060	55.6%	−14.1%
Republican	Alan Fine	52,263	21.3%	−3.1%
Independence	Tammy Lee	51,456	21.0%	−
Green	Jay Pond	4,792	2%	−3.7%

=== 2008 ===
2008 Minnesota 5th congressional district election
Party	Candidate	Votes	%	±%
Democratic (DFL)	Keith Ellison (Incumbent)	228,776	70.9	+15.3%
Republican	Barb Davis White	71,020	22	+0.7%
Independence	Bill McGaughey	22,318	6.9	−14.9%

=== 2010 ===
2010 Minnesota 5th congressional district election
Party	Candidate	Votes	%	±%
Democratic (DFL)	Keith Ellison (Incumbent)	154,833	67.7	−3.2
Republican	Joel Demos	55,222	24.1	+2.1%
Independent	Lynne Torgerson	8,548	3.7	−
Independence	Tom Schrunk	7,446	3.3	−3.6%
Independent Progressive	Michael James Cavlan	2,468	1.1	−

=== 2012 ===
2012 Minnesota 5th congressional district election
Party	Candidate	Votes	%	±%
Democratic (DFL)	Keith Ellison (Incumbent)	262,102	74.5	+6.8%
Republican	Chris Fields	88,753	25.2	+1.1%

=== 2014 ===
2014 Minnesota 5th congressional district election
Party	Candidate	Votes	%	±%
Democratic (DFL)	Keith Ellison (Incumbent)	167,079	70.8	−3.7%
Republican	Doug Daggett	56,577	24.0	−1.2%
Independence	Lee Bauer	12,001	5.1	—

=== 2016 ===
2016 Minnesota 5th congressional district election
Party	Candidate	Votes	%	±%
Democratic (DFL)	Keith Ellison (Incumbent)	249,964	69.1	−1.6%
Republican	Frank Drake	80,660	22.3	−1.7%
Legal Marijuana Now	Dennis Schuller	30,759	8.5	—

=== 2018 ===
2018 Minnesota 5th congressional district election
Party	Candidate	Votes	%	±%
Democratic (DFL)	Ilhan Omar	267,703	78.0	+8.8%
Republican	Jennifer Zielinski	74,440	21.7	−0.6%

=== 2020 ===
2020 Minnesota's 5th congressional district election
Party	Candidate	Votes	%
Democratic (DFL)	Ilhan Omar (Incumbent)	255,924	64.3
Republican	Lacy Johnson	102,878	25.8
Legal Marijuana Now	Michael Moore	37,979	9.5
Write-in		1,448	0.4
Turnout		398,229	
Democratic (DFL) hold			

=== 2022 ===
2022 Minnesota's 5th congressional district election
Party	Candidate	Votes	%
Democratic (DFL)	Ilhan Omar (Incumbent)	214,224	74.33
Republican	Cicely Davis	70,702	24.53
Write-in		3,280	1.14
Democratic (DFL) hold			

=== 2024 ===
2024 Minnesota's 5th congressional district election
Party	Candidate	Votes	%
Democratic (DFL)	Ilhan Omar (incumbent)	261,066	74.4
Republican	Dalia Al-Aqidi	86,213	24.6
Write-in		3,768	1.1
Total votes		351,047	100.0
Democratic (DFL) hold			

== See also ==
- Minnesota's congressional districts
- List of United States congressional districts
