= 2022 Minnesota elections =

2022 Minnesota general election
- November 8, 2022

All statewide executive offices
- Turnout: 61.01%
	Majority party	Minority party
Party	Democratic	Republican
Last election	5	0
Seats before	5	0
Seats won	5	0
Seat change	Steady	Steady

A general election was held in the U.S. state of Minnesota on November 8, 2022. All of Minnesota's executive officers were up for election, as well as all the seats in the Minnesota Senate and the Minnesota House of Representatives, several judicial seats, Minnesota's eight seats in the United States House of Representatives, and several seats for local offices. Primary elections to nominate major party candidates and several judicial and local primary elections were held on August 9, 2022.

The Democratic–Farmer–Labor Party (DFL) won a majority of the Minnesota Senate for the first time since 2016, while maintaining its majority in the Minnesota House of Representatives and control of all statewide offices, and as such won full control of Minnesota state government for the first time since 2014.

== Federal elections ==
=== United States House of Representatives ===
Minnesota's eight seats in the United States House of Representatives were up for election. The DFL and the Republicans previously held four seats each.

All incumbents won re-election.

== Statewide executive elections ==
=== Governor ===
Incumbent DFL Governor Tim Walz sought re-election. Also running were Republican Scott Jensen, Steve Patterson for Grassroots–Legalize Cannabis, James McCaskel for Legal Marijuana Now, Hugh McTavish for Independence-Alliance, and Gabrielle Prosser for the Socialist Workers Party.

Walz won re-election to a second term with 52.3% of the vote.

=== Secretary of state ===
Incumbent DFL secretary of state Steve Simon won re-election to a third term with 54.5% of the vote. He defeated Republican Kim Crockett.

=== State auditor ===
Incumbent DFL State Auditor Julie Blaha ran for re-election to a second term. Also running were Republican Ryan Wilson, Will Finn for Grassroots–Legalize Cannabis, and Tim Davis for Legal Marijuana Now.

Blaha narrowly won the election with 47.5% of the vote, compared to Wilson's 47.1%.

=== Attorney general ===
Incumbent DFL attorney general Keith Ellison ran for re-election. He was challenged by Republican Jim Schultz.

Ellison narrowly won the election with 50.4% of the vote, compared to Schultz's 49.5%.

== Legislative elections ==
=== Minnesota Senate ===
All 67 seats in the Minnesota Senate were up for election in 2022. The Republicans held a majority of 34 seats, with the DFL holding 31 and independents holding two.

The DFL was able to pick up three seats, giving them a one-seat majority in the chamber.

=== Minnesota House of Representatives ===
All 134 seats in the Minnesota House of Representatives were up for election in 2022. The DFL held a majority of 69 seats before the election.

The DFL picked up a seat, increasing their majority to 70 seats compared to the Republican's 64.

== Judicial elections ==
Two seats on the Minnesota Supreme Court were up for election. Justice Natalie Hudson won re-election. Justice Gordon Moore sought his first election following his appointment in 2020. Both were unopposed. 10 seats on the Minnesota Court of Appeals and several seats on the Minnesota District Courts were also up for election.

== Local elections ==
Elections for several subdivisions were held, including elections for counties, municipalities, school districts, and hospital districts.
