= 2008 United States presidential election in Minnesota =

- November 4, 2008
- Turnout: 78.11% (▼0.66 pp)

Nominee	Barack Obama	John McCain
Party	Democratic (DFL)	Republican
Home state	Illinois	Arizona
Running mate	Joe Biden	Sarah Palin
Electoral vote	10	0
Popular vote	1,573,354	1,275,409
Percentage	54.06%	43.82%

Obama
30–40%
40–50%
50–60%
60–70%
70–80%
80–90%
90–100%
McCain
40–50%
50–60%
60–70%
70–80%
80–90%
90–100%
Tie/No Data
President before election
George W. Bush
Republican
Elected President
Barack Obama
Democratic (DFL)

The 2008 United States presidential election in Minnesota took place on November 4, 2008, and was part of the 2008 United States presidential election. Voters chose ten representatives, or electors to the Electoral College, who voted for president and vice president.

Minnesota was won by DFL nominee Barack Obama by a 10.2% margin of victory. Prior to the election, all 17 news organizations considered this a state Obama would win, or otherwise considered as a safe blue state. Barack Obama carried the state with 54.06% of the vote in 2008 over John McCain's 43.82%. Obama became the first ever Democrat to win the White House without carrying Lake of the Woods County, the first to do so without carrying Clearwater County since Woodrow Wilson in 1912, and the first to do so without carrying Anoka or Jackson Counties since Woodrow Wilson in 1916.

In 2008 78.1% of eligible Minnesotans voted – the highest percentage of any U.S. state – versus the national average of 61.2% As of 2024, this election was the last time Minnesota voted by a double-digit margin for a presidential candidate.

== Caucuses ==
- 2008 Minnesota Democratic presidential caucuses

== Campaign ==
=== Predictions ===
There were 16 news organizations who made state-by-state predictions of the election. Here are the last predictions before election day:

Source	Ranking
D.C. Political Report	Likely D
Cook Political Report	Lean D
The Takeaway	Solid D
Electoral-vote.com	Solid D
Washington Post	Lean D
Politico	Solid D
RealClearPolitics	Solid D
FiveThirtyEight	Solid D
CQ Politics	Lean D
The New York Times	Lean D
CNN	Lean D
NPR	Solid D
MSNBC	Solid D
Fox News	Likely D
Associated Press	Likely D
Rasmussen Reports	Safe D

=== Polling ===
In the aftermath of the Republican National Convention that was highlighted by a well delivered and received speech by vice presidential nominee Governor Sarah Palin, a strong Obama lead tightened into a very narrow polling lead. However, when the September financial crisis irreparably damaged McCain's chances at victory, McCain remained competitive in Minnesota for some time after Obama had pulled away in other states such as Michigan and Wisconsin. At no time, however, did polls indicate that John McCain was ahead in the state, and Obama eventually did pull away from John McCain.

=== 2008 Republican National Convention ===
The 2008 Republican National Convention took place at the Xcel Energy Center in Saint Paul, Minnesota, from September 1, through September 4, 2008. The first day of the Republican Party's convention fell on Labor Day, the last day of the popular Minnesota State Fair, though because of Hurricane Gustav, this day was mostly a call for action to help victims and formal, required activities; most of the politicking and partying did not start until Tuesday, the second scheduled day

Four cities made bids to the Republican National Committee (RNC) for proposals to host the 2008 Convention. Those cities were Cleveland, Ohio; Minneapolis-Saint Paul, Minnesota; New York City, New York; and Tampa-St. Petersburg, Florida. The RNC Selection Committee made its recommendation for Minneapolis-Saint Paul and on September 27, 2006, the RNC made its decision public that the 2008 Republican National Convention would be held in Minneapolis-Saint Paul. The RNC made their decision earlier than originally scheduled because the Democratic National Committee (DNC) also had Minneapolis-Saint Paul as a finalist among bidding cities. (After the RNC's selection, the DNC removed Minneapolis-Saint Paul from consideration which left the DNC with only two cities to choose from: New York City and Denver, Colorado.) This is the second time the Minneapolis-Saint Paul area held the Republican National Convention—the first was held in 1892.

=== Fundraising ===
John McCain raised a total of $2,423,705 in the state. Barack Obama raised $6,058,168.

=== Advertising and visits ===
Obama and his interest groups spent $3,006,784. McCain and his interest groups spent 4,467,107. The Republican ticket visited the state 9 times. Obama visited the state only once.

== Analysis ==
Minnesota has the longest streak as a blue state, having last voted for a Republican presidential nominee in 1972. However, the Democrats' margins of victory in 2000 and 2004 were relatively narrow. With this in mind, Republicans targeted the state for the 2008 election, holding the 2008 Republican National Convention in Minneapolis-St. Paul. Although the state swung more Democratic in 2008 and Barack Obama performed better here than John Kerry did in 2004, the swing was smaller than the national average.

During the same election, a contentious U.S. Senate battle took place between incumbent Republican U.S. Senator Norm Coleman and Democrat Al Franken. The close election resulted in two court appeals, both of which eventually declared Franken the winner. At the state level, Democrats picked up two seats in the Minnesota House of Representatives and one seat in the Minnesota Senate.

On Election Day, Obama won Minnesota by a comfortable margin, piling up 2-1 margins in Hennepin County (Minneapolis) and Ramsey County (St. Paul). Obama also ran evenly in the Minneapolis suburbs and rural Minnesota. However, McCain mostly held the same counties Bush won in the Republican base of central Minnesota. While Obama still won the state with ease, GOP efforts and the Republican National Convention led to a better Republican performance than seen in neighboring states in the Upper Midwest, and prevented the collapse of Republican support that occurred in neighboring Michigan and Wisconsin. Obama was the first Democrat to carry Olmstead County since 1964.

As of the 2024 presidential election, this is the last election in which Stevens County, Watonwan County, Pope County, Grant County, Yellow Medicine County, Lincoln County, Pennington County, Murray County, Pine County, Big Stone County, Marshall County, Polk County, Red Lake County, and Aitkin County voted for the Democratic candidate.

== Results ==
2008 United States presidential election in Minnesota
Party	Candidate	Running mate	Votes	Percentage	Electoral votes
Democratic (DFL)	Barack Obama	Joe Biden	1,573,354	54.06%	10
Republican	John McCain	Sarah Palin	1,275,409	43.82%	0
Independent	Ralph Nader	Matt Gonzalez	30,152	1.04%	0
Independent	Write-in candidates		9,496	0.33%	0
Libertarian	Bob Barr	Wayne Allyn Root	9,174	0.32%	0
Constitution	Chuck Baldwin	Darrell Castle	6,787	0.23%	0
Green	Cynthia McKinney	Rosa Clemente	5,174	0.18%	0
Socialist Workers	Róger Calero	Alyson Kennedy	790	0.03%	0
Independent	Alan Keyes (write-in)	Brian Rohrbough	22	0.00%	0
Socialist Party USA	Brian Moore (write-in)	Stewart Alexander	7	0.00%	0
Independent	Joe Schriner (write-in)	Dale Way	3	0.00%	0
Independent	Curtis Montgomery (write-in)	Janice Montgomery	1	0.00%	0
Totals			2,910,369	100.00%	10
Voter turnout (Voting age population)					74.7%

=== By county ===
County	Barack Obama DFL		John McCain Republican		Various candidates Other parties		Margin		Total votes cast
County	#	%	#	%	#	%	#	%	Total votes cast
Aitkin	4,595	48.83%	4,589	48.77%	226	2.40%	6	0.06%	9,410
Anoka	86,976	47.73%	91,357	50.13%	3,891	2.14%	-4,381	-2.40%	182,224
Becker	7,687	45.31%	8,851	52.17%	427	2.52%	-1,164	-6.86%	16,965
Beltrami	12,019	54.05%	9,762	43.90%	455	2.05%	2,257	10.15%	22,236
Benton	8,454	43.71%	10,338	53.46%	547	2.83%	-1,884	-9.75%	19,339
Big Stone	1,552	51.91%	1,362	45.55%	76	2.54%	190	6.36%	2,990
Blue Earth	19,325	55.10%	14,782	42.15%	963	2.75%	4,543	12.95%	35,070
Brown	5,809	42.65%	7,456	54.74%	355	2.61%	-1,647	-12.09%	13,620
Carlton	11,501	62.34%	6,549	35.50%	399	2.16%	4,952	26.84%	18,449
Carver	20,654	41.57%	28,156	56.67%	873	1.76%	-7,502	-15.10%	49,683
Cass	7,276	44.62%	8,660	53.11%	371	2.27%	-1,384	-8.49%	16,307
Chippewa	3,280	51.60%	2,907	45.74%	169	2.66%	373	5.86%	6,356
Chisago	12,783	43.62%	15,789	53.88%	733	2.50%	-3,006	-10.26%	29,305
Clay	16,666	56.96%	11,978	40.94%	615	2.10%	4,688	16.02%	29,259
Clearwater	1,877	44.05%	2,291	53.77%	93	2.18%	-414	-9.72%	4,261
Cook	2,019	60.30%	1,240	37.04%	89	2.66%	779	23.26%	3,348
Cottonwood	2,759	45.71%	3,157	52.30%	120	1.99%	-398	-6.59%	6,036
Crow Wing	15,859	45.10%	18,567	52.80%	739	2.10%	-2,708	-7.70%	35,165
Dakota	116,778	51.79%	104,364	46.29%	4,330	1.92%	12,414	5.50%	225,472
Dodge	4,463	43.70%	5,468	53.54%	282	2.76%	-1,005	-9.84%	10,213
Douglas	9,256	44.25%	11,241	53.74%	421	2.01%	-1,985	-9.49%	20,918
Faribault	3,736	45.83%	4,196	51.47%	220	2.70%	-460	-5.64%	8,152
Fillmore	5,921	52.71%	4,993	44.45%	320	2.84%	928	8.26%	11,234
Freeborn	9,915	57.38%	6,955	40.25%	410	2.37%	2,960	17.13%	17,280
Goodhue	12,420	48.15%	12,775	49.53%	600	2.32%	-355	-1.38%	25,795
Grant	1,850	51.32%	1,646	45.66%	109	3.02%	204	5.66%	3,605
Hennepin	420,958	63.42%	231,054	34.81%	11,768	1.77%	189,904	28.61%	663,780
Houston	5,906	54.27%	4,743	43.58%	234	2.15%	1,163	10.69%	10,883
Hubbard	4,872	41.86%	6,558	56.35%	208	1.79%	-1,686	-14.49%	11,638
Isanti	8,248	41.13%	11,324	56.47%	481	2.40%	-3,076	-15.34%	20,053
Itasca	13,460	55.18%	10,309	42.26%	626	2.56%	3,151	12.92%	24,395
Jackson	2,618	46.56%	2,858	50.83%	147	2.61%	-240	-4.27%	5,623
Kanabec	3,743	44.04%	4,479	52.70%	277	3.26%	-736	-8.66%	8,499
Kandiyohi	10,125	46.24%	11,319	51.70%	451	2.06%	-1,194	-5.46%	21,895
Kittson	1,492	58.10%	1,016	39.56%	60	2.34%	476	18.54%	2,568
Koochiching	3,649	53.65%	2,962	43.55%	191	2.80%	687	10.10%	6,802
Lac qui Parle	2,160	51.53%	1,912	45.61%	120	2.86%	248	5.92%	4,192
Lake	4,174	59.89%	2,636	37.82%	159	2.29%	1,538	22.07%	6,969
Lake of the Woods	971	41.98%	1,278	55.25%	64	2.77%	-307	-13.27%	2,313
Le Sueur	6,994	46.60%	7,636	50.88%	379	2.52%	-642	-4.28%	15,009
Lincoln	1,517	48.53%	1,491	47.70%	118	3.77%	26	0.83%	3,126
Lyon	6,110	48.08%	6,315	49.69%	283	2.23%	-205	-1.61%	12,708
McLeod	7,505	39.44%	10,993	57.77%	531	2.79%	-3,488	-18.33%	19,029
Mahnomen	1,436	61.29%	843	35.98%	64	2.73%	593	25.31%	2,343
Marshall	2,311	48.77%	2,285	48.22%	143	3.01%	26	0.55%	4,739
Martin	4,413	41.04%	6,053	56.29%	288	2.67%	-1,640	-15.25%	10,754
Meeker	5,380	42.89%	6,737	53.70%	428	3.41%	-1,357	-10.81%	12,545
Mille Lacs	6,072	44.83%	7,049	52.05%	423	3.12%	-977	-7.22%	13,544
Morrison	6,547	39.10%	9,735	58.14%	461	2.76%	-3,188	-19.04%	16,743
Mower	11,605	60.48%	7,075	36.87%	507	2.65%	4,530	23.61%	19,187
Murray	2,345	48.72%	2,320	48.20%	148	3.08%	25	0.52%	4,813
Nicollet	9,887	54.19%	7,968	43.67%	390	2.14%	1,919	10.52%	18,245
Nobles	4,244	48.16%	4,368	49.56%	201	2.28%	-124	-1.40%	8,813
Norman	2,129	62.00%	1,204	35.06%	101	2.94%	925	26.94%	3,434
Olmsted	38,711	50.62%	36,202	47.34%	1,557	2.04%	2,509	3.28%	76,470
Otter Tail	13,856	42.39%	18,077	55.30%	754	2.31%	-4,221	-12.91%	32,687
Pennington	3,394	49.75%	3,248	47.61%	180	2.64%	146	2.14%	6,822
Pine	7,084	49.25%	6,862	47.71%	437	3.04%	222	1.54%	14,383
Pipestone	2,023	42.14%	2,652	55.24%	126	2.62%	-629	-13.10%	4,801
Polk	7,850	51.19%	7,148	46.62%	336	2.19%	702	4.57%	15,334
Pope	3,317	50.75%	3,069	46.96%	150	2.29%	248	3.79%	6,536
Ramsey	182,974	65.96%	88,942	32.06%	5,470	1.98%	94,032	33.90%	277,386
Red Lake	1,120	51.12%	983	44.87%	88	4.01%	137	6.25%	2,191
Redwood	3,250	41.63%	4,308	55.19%	248	3.18%	-1,058	-13.56%	7,806
Renville	3,904	47.99%	3,956	48.63%	275	3.38%	-52	-0.64%	8,135
Rice	17,381	54.66%	13,723	43.16%	695	2.18%	3,658	11.50%	31,799
Rock	2,079	41.79%	2,775	55.78%	121	2.43%	-696	-13.99%	4,975
Roseau	3,097	40.22%	4,438	57.64%	165	2.14%	-1,341	-17.42%	7,700
St. Louis	77,351	65.10%	38,742	32.61%	2,721	2.29%	38,609	32.49%	118,814
Scott	29,208	43.51%	36,724	54.70%	1,200	1.79%	-7,516	-11.19%	67,132
Sherburne	17,957	39.91%	26,140	58.10%	893	1.99%	-8,183	-18.19%	44,990
Sibley	2,998	38.79%	4,492	58.12%	239	3.09%	-1,494	-19.33%	7,729
Stearns	35,690	45.32%	41,194	52.31%	1,872	2.37%	-5,504	-6.99%	78,756
Steele	9,016	45.87%	10,068	51.22%	572	2.91%	-1,052	-5.35%	19,656
Stevens	2,781	49.36%	2,710	48.10%	143	2.54%	71	1.26%	5,634
Swift	2,907	55.43%	2,184	41.65%	153	2.92%	723	13.78%	5,244
Todd	5,277	43.05%	6,637	54.15%	343	2.80%	-1,360	-11.10%	12,257
Traverse	1,043	51.25%	933	45.85%	59	2.90%	110	5.40%	2,035
Wabasha	5,646	47.47%	5,935	49.90%	312	2.63%	-289	-2.43%	11,893
Wadena	2,882	40.20%	4,128	57.58%	159	2.22%	-1,246	-17.38%	7,169
Waseca	4,401	44.51%	5,211	52.70%	276	2.79%	-810	-8.19%	9,888
Washington	70,277	51.27%	64,334	46.94%	2,448	1.79%	5,943	4.33%	137,059
Watonwan	2,562	48.73%	2,526	48.04%	170	3.23%	36	0.69%	5,258
Wilkin	1,550	45.40%	1,786	52.31%	78	2.29%	-236	-6.91%	3,414
Winona	16,308	58.38%	10,975	39.29%	652	2.33%	5,333	19.09%	27,935
Wright	26,343	40.17%	37,779	57.61%	1,456	2.22%	-11,436	-17.44%	65,578
Yellow Medicine	2,816	50.57%	2,579	46.31%	174	3.12%	237	4.26%	5,569
Totals	1,573,354	54.06%	1,275,409	43.82%	61,606	2.12%	297,945	10.24%	2,910,369

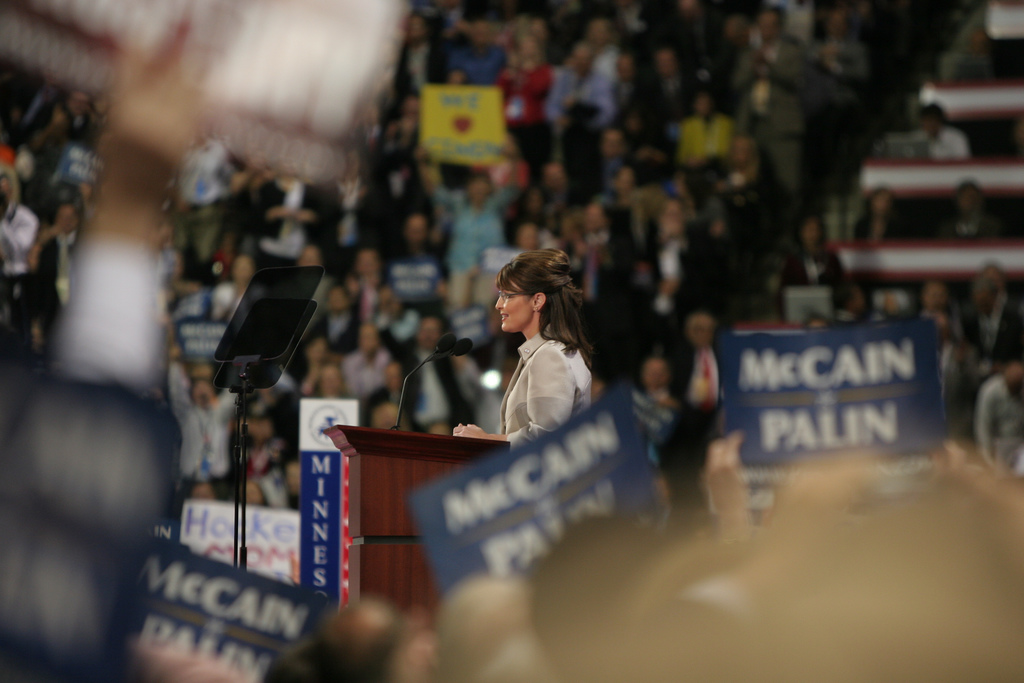
Palin speaking at the 2008 Republican National Convention in St Paul, Minnesota.

Counties that flipped from Republican to Democratic

- Aitkin (largest city: Aitkin)
- Clay (largest city: Moorhead)
- Dakota (largest city: Hastings)
- Grant (largest city: Elbow Lake)
- Houston (largest city: La Crescent)
- Lincoln (largest city: Tyler)
- Marshall (largest city: Warren)
- Murray (largest city: Slayton)
- Olmsted (largest city: Rochester)
- Pennington (largest city: Thief River Falls)
- Polk (largest city: East Grand Forks)
- Pope (largest city: Glenwood)
- Red Lake (largest city: Red Lake Falls)
- Stevens (largest city: Morris)
- Traverse (largest city: Wheaton)
- Washington (largest city: Stillwater)
- Watonwan (largest city: St. James)
- Yellow Medicine (largest city: Granite Falls)

=== By congressional district ===
Barack Obama carried five of eight congressional districts. Each candidate won a district that elected a representatives of the other party.

District	McCain	Obama	Representative
1st	46.59%	50.96%	Tim Walz
2nd	49.76%	48.32%	John Kline
3rd	45.99%	52.41%	Jim Ramstad (110th Congress)
3rd	45.99%	52.41%	Erik Paulsen (111th Congress)
4th	33.57%	64.41%	Betty McCollum
5th	23.79%	74.15%	Keith Ellison
6th	53.33%	44.60%	Michele Bachmann
7th	50.10%	47.39%	Collin Peterson
8th	44.50%	53.10%	Jim Oberstar

== Electors ==
Technically the voters of Minnesota cast ballots for electors: representatives to the Electoral College. Minnesota is allocated 10 electors because it has 8 congressional districts and 2 senators. All candidates who appear on the ballot or qualify to receive write-in votes must submit a list of 10 electors, who pledge to vote for their candidate and his or her running mate. Whoever wins the majority of votes in the state is awarded all 10 electoral votes. Their chosen electors then vote for president and vice president. Following an apparent mishap in the previous election, whereby an elector pledged to Democratic presidential candidate John Kerry instead cast their vote for running-mate John Edwards and thus became a faithless elector, Minnesota amended its statutes and became one of the few states whereby electors are legally required to vote for the candidate they are pledged to. This was the first election where the new laws were effective.

The electors of each state and the District of Columbia met on December 15, 2008, to cast their votes for president and vice president. The Electoral College itself never meets as one body. Instead the electors from each state and the District of Columbia met in their respective capitols.

The following were the members of the Electoral College from the state. All 10 were pledged to Barack Obama and Joe Biden:

1. Arthur A. Anderson
2. Jim Gremmels
3. Dave Lee
4. Al Patton
5. Joan M. Wittman
6. William J. Davis
7. Benjamin F. Gross
8. Matt Little
9. Jackie Stevenson
10. Susan Kay Moravec - replaced Donyta J. Wright who did not appear for the ceremony

== See also ==
- United States presidential elections in Minnesota
