= 2026 Minnesota Attorney General election =

- November 3, 2026
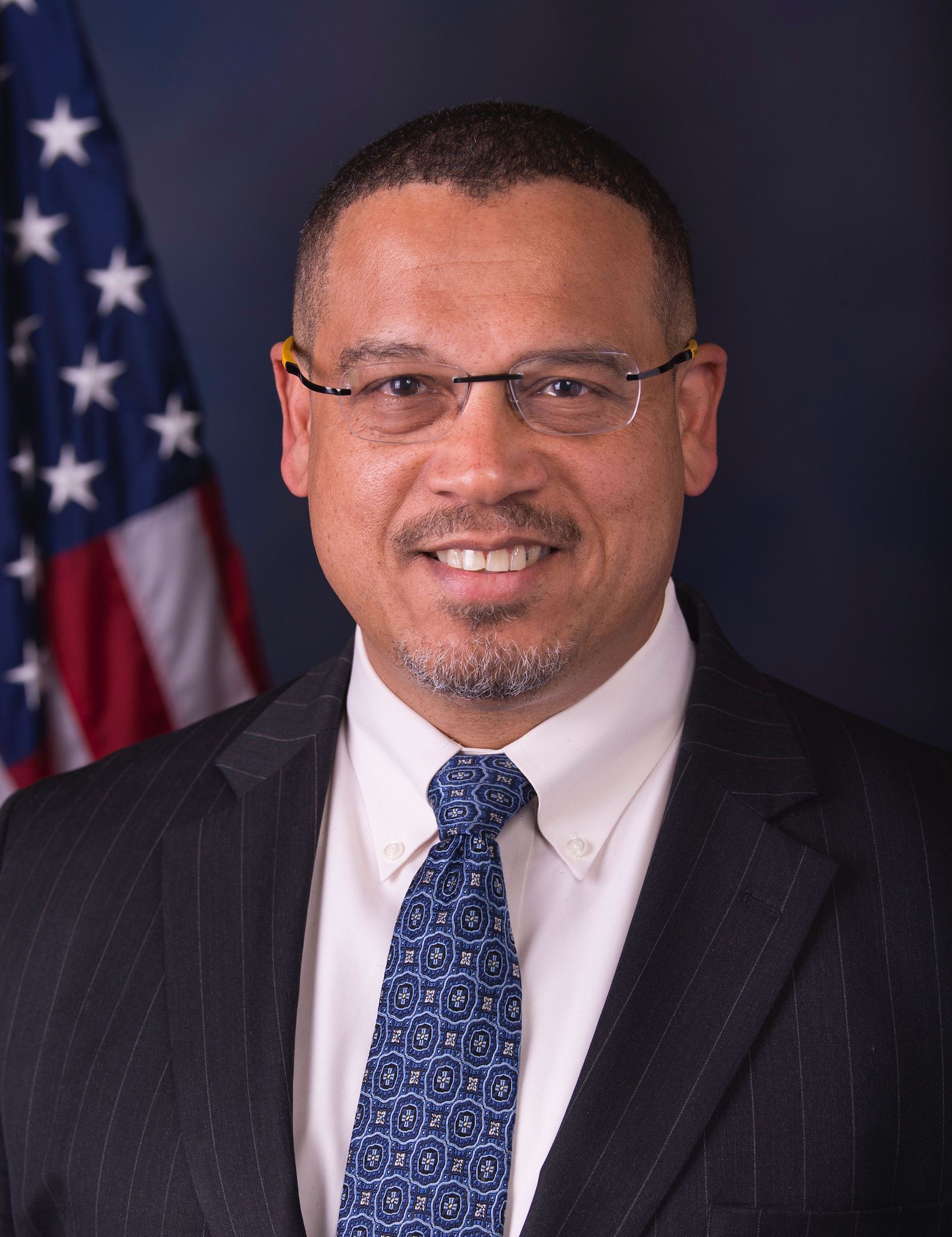

Nominee	Keith Ellison	Ron Schutz
Party	Democratic (DFL)	Republican
Popular vote	1,520,967	1,276,211
Percentage	54.29%	45.56%
- Ellison: 40–50% 50–60% 60–70% 70–80% 80–90% >90% Schutz: 40–50% 50–60% 60–70% 70–80% 80–90% >90% Tie: 40–50% 50% No votes
Attorney General before election
Keith Ellison
Democratic (DFL)
Elected Attorney General
Keith Ellison
Democratic (DFL)

The 2026 Minnesota Attorney General election took place on November 3, 2026, to elect the attorney general of Minnesota. Incumbent Democratic attorney general Keith Ellison won re-election to a third term in office.

Republicans have not won a Minnesota attorney general election since 1966.

== Democratic-Farmer-Labor primary ==
=== Candidates ===
==== Nominee ====
- Keith Ellison, incumbent attorney general (2019–present)

==== Eliminated in primary ====
- David J.S. Madgett, consumer protection attorney

=== Endorsements ===
Keith Ellison

Organizations

- End Citizens United
- Reproductive Freedom for All

Political parties

- Minnesota Democratic-Farmer-Labor Party

Labor Unions

- AFL-CIO
- SEIU Minnesota State Council

=== Results ===
Primary results by county: Ellison: 70–80%; 80–90%; 90–100%

Primary results by congressional district: Ellison: 70–80%; 80–90%

Primary results by state senate district: Ellison: 70–80%; 80–90%; 90–100%

Primary results by state house district: Ellison: 70–80%; 80–90%; 90–100%

Primary results by precinct: Ellison: 70–80%; 80–90%; 90–100%; Madgett: 50–60%; 60–70%; 70–80%; 80–90%; 90–100%; 50% Tie No Votes Cast

Democratic primary results
Party	Candidate	Votes	%
Democratic	Keith Ellison (incumbent)	573,187	84.7
Democratic	David J.S. Madgett	103,743	15.3
Total votes		676,930	100.0

== Republican primary ==
=== Candidates ===
==== Nominee ====
- Ron Schutz, former chairman of Robins Kaplan LLP, former military prosecutor and Captain at United States Army JAG Corps.

==== Declined ====
- Tad Jude, former judge from the 10th judicial district (2011–2021), former Democratic state senator from the 48th district (1983–1989), and nominee for Minnesota's 3rd congressional district in 2024 (running for secretary of state)
- Ryan Wilson, attorney and nominee for state auditor in 2022 (became Lisa Demuth's running mate in the concurrent gubernatorial election)

=== Endorsements ===
Ron Schutz

Political parties

- Republican Party of Minnesota

=== Results ===
Republican primary results
Party	Candidate	Votes	%
Republican	Ron Schutz	369,353	100.0
Total votes		369,353	100.0

== General election ==
=== Predictions ===
Source	Ranking	As of
Sabato's Crystal Ball	Tossup	August 21, 2025

=== Post-primary endorsements ===
Keith Ellison (D)

Labor unions

- United Auto Workers

Organizations

- Everytown for Gun Safety

=== Polling ===
Poll source	Date(s) administered	Sample size (Note: Key: A – all adults RV – registered voters LV – likely voters V – unclear)	Margin of error	Keith Ellison (DFL)	Ron Schutz (R)	Undecided
KSTP/SurveyUSA	October 24–28, 2026	714 (LV)	± 4.2%	49%	41%	10%
State Navigate	October 26–28, 2026	806 (LV)	± 3.5%	52%	44%	4%
KSTP/SurveyUSA	October 8–12, 2026	718 (LV)	± 4.2%	45%	44%	11%
Mason-Dixon Polling & Strategy (Note: Poll sponsored by KARE & The Minnesota Star Tribune)	October 5–7, 2026	800 (LV)	± 3.5%	48%	40%	12%
Morning Consult (Note: Poll conducted for The Daily Agenda)	October 2–7, 2026	1,000 (RV)	± 3.1%	43%	39%	14%
KTSP/SurveyUSA	September 9–14, 2026	654 (LV)	± 4.4%	43%	45%	12%
KTSP/SurveyUSA	August 13–17, 2026	661 (LV)	± 4.3%	43%	43%	15%
	August 11, 2026	Primary elections				
KSTP/SurveyUSA	July 29 – August 4, 2026	1,435 (LV)	± 3.2%	44%	36%	20%
KSTP/SurveyUSA	July 15–20, 2026	1,387 (LV)	± 3.1%	42%	38%	20%
KSTP/SurveyUSA	June 11–16, 2026	1,440 (LV)	± 3.1%	44%	37%	19%

=== Results ===
2026 Minnesota Attorney General election
Party	Candidate	Votes	%	±%
Democratic (DFL)	Keith Ellison (incumbent)	1,520,967	54.29%	+3.92%
Republican	Ronald J. Schutz	1,276,211	45.56%	−3.97%
Write-in		4,226	0.15%	+0.05%
Total votes			100.0	
Democratic (DFL) hold				

==== By congressional district ====
Ellison won four congressional districts, while Schutz won four congressional districts.

District	Ellison	Schutz	Elected Representative
1st	46.65%	53.24%	Jake Johnson
2nd	54.23%	45.61%	Matt Little
3rd	60.22%	39.61%	Kelly Morrison
4th	70.56%	29.23%	Betty McCollum
5th	83.41%	16.39%	Ilhan Omar
6th	41.41%	58.45%	Tom Emmer
7th	32.94%	66.97%	Michelle Fischbach
8th	44.66%	55.22%	Pete Stauber
