= 2026 Minnesota State Auditor election =

- November 3, 2026
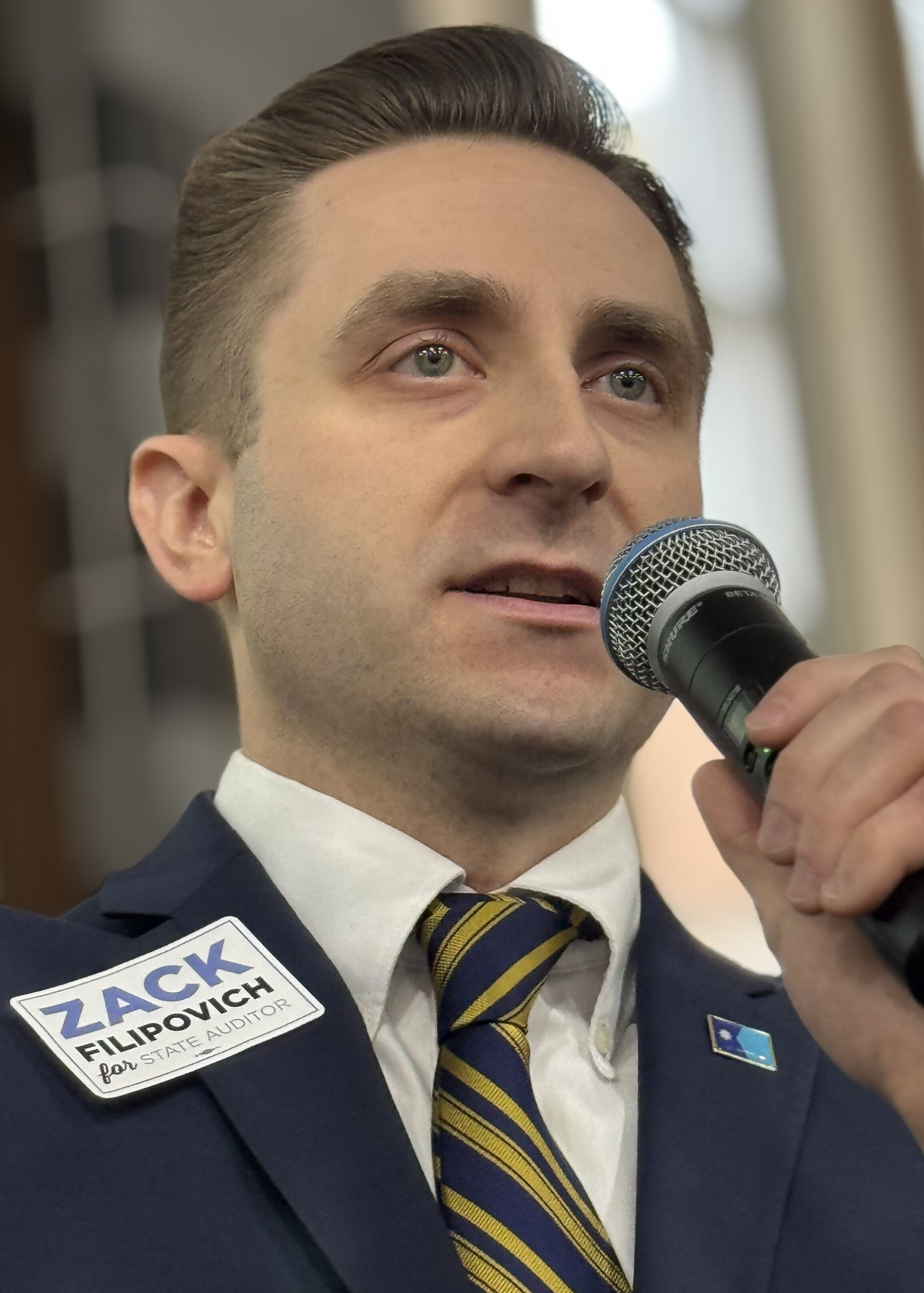

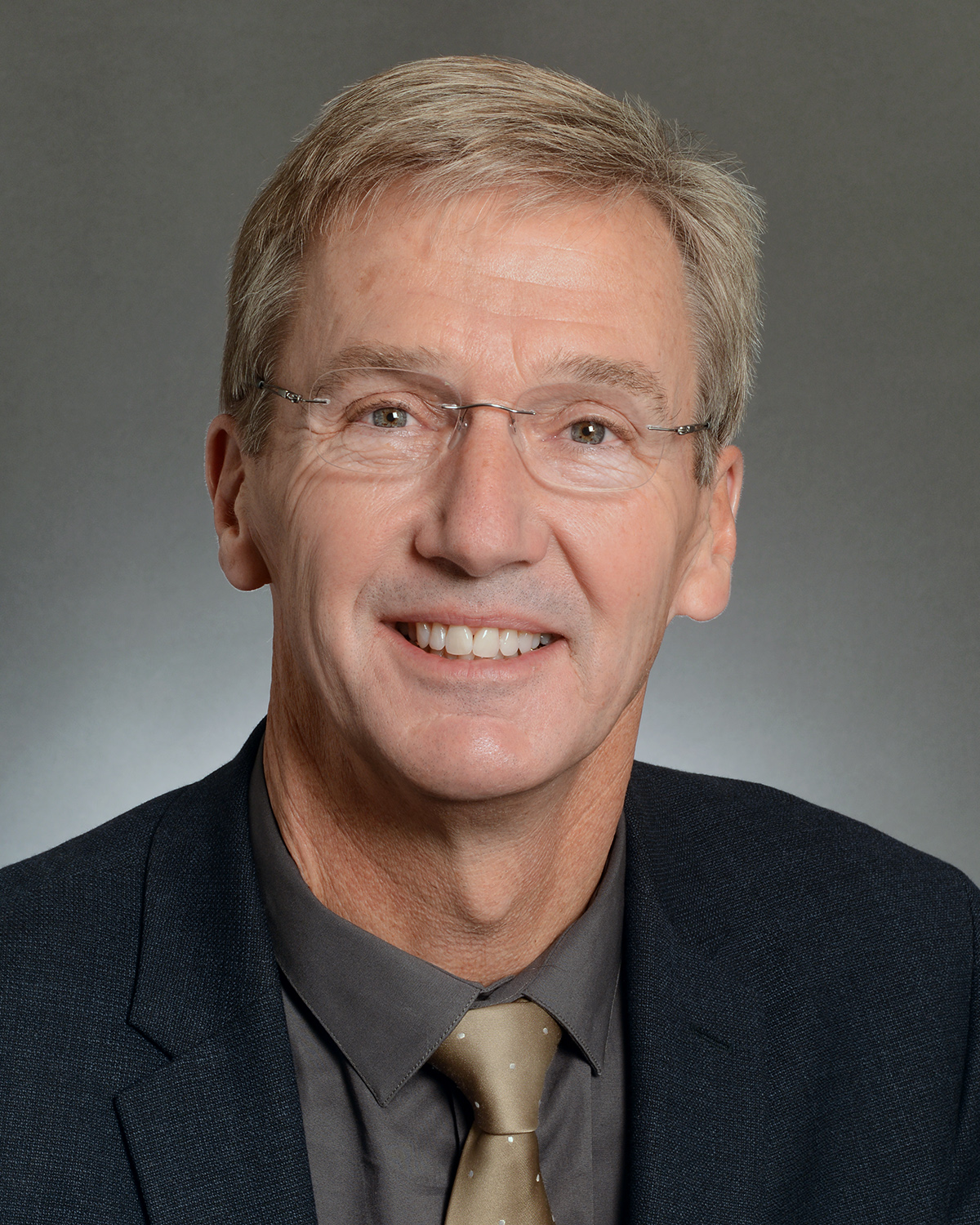
Nominee	Zack Filipovich	Scott Jensen
Party	Democratic (DFL)	Republican
Popular vote	1,473,978	1,230,200
Percentage	52.93%	44.18%
- Filipovich: 40–50% 50–60% 60–70% 70–80% 80–90% >90% Jensen: 40–50% 50–60% 60–70% 70–80% 80–90% >90% Tie: 40–50% 50% No votes
State Auditor before election
Julie Blaha
Democratic (DFL)
Elected State Auditor
Zack Filipovich
Democratic (DFL)

The 2026 Minnesota State Auditor election took place on November 3, 2026, to elect the state auditor of Minnesota, the official charged with supervising and auditing local government finances. Incumbent auditor Julie Blaha announced in September 2025 that she is not seeking re-election. Former Duluth City Council member Zack Filipovich is the DFL nominee, facing Republican Scott Jensen and Forward Independence candidate Jay Reeves in the general election. This is the first election for Minnesota State Auditor in 36 years not to have a female candidate from either party.

== Democratic-Farmer-Labor primary ==
=== Candidates ===
==== Nominee ====
- Zack Filipovich, accountant and former Duluth City Councilor (2014–2022)

==== Eliminated at convention ====
- Adam Jennings, mayor of Tonka Bay (2021–present)
- Dan Wolgamott, state representative from district 14B (2019–present)

==== Withdrawn ====
- Ben Schierer, former mayor of Fergus Falls (2017–2025) (running for lieutenant governor with Klobuchar)

==== Declined ====
- Julie Blaha, incumbent state auditor (2019–present)

=== Endorsements ===
Zack Filipovich

Labor unions

- Minnesota AFL-CIO
- SEIU Minnesota State Council

Organizations

- Stonewall DFL

Political parties

- Minnesota Democratic-Farmer-Labor Party
Adam Jennings (withdrawn)

Labor unions

- United Auto Workers

Organizations

- Stonewall DFL
Ben Schierer (withdrawn)

U.S. representatives

- Collin Peterson, former MN-07 (1991–2021)

Statewide officials

- Keith Ellison, attorney general of Minnesota (2019–present)

=== Results ===
Democratic primary results
Party	Candidate	Votes	%
Democratic (DFL)	Zack Filipovich	592,757	100.0
Total votes		592,757	100.0

== Republican primary ==
=== Candidates ===
==== Nominee ====
- Scott Jensen, former state senator from the 47th district (2017–2021) and nominee for governor in 2022

==== Eliminated in primary ====
- Will Finn
- Nate George, mayor of Braham (2023–present)

==== Withdrawn ====
- Elliott Engen, state representative from District 36A (2023–present) (withdrew to run for lieutenant governor before dropping out, ran for re-election to the Minnesota House of Representatives, then withdrew his re-election campaign)

=== Endorsements ===
Nate George

Political parties

- Republican Party of Minnesota

=== Results ===
Primary results by county: Jensen: 50–60%; 60–70%; 70–80%

Primary results by congressional district: Jensen: 60–70%

Primary results by state senate district: Jensen: 50–60%; 60–70%; 70–80%

Primary results by state house district: Jensen: 50–60%; 60–70%; 70–80%

Primary results by precinct: Jensen: 30–40%; 40–50%; 50–60%; 60–70%; 70–80%; 80–90%; 90–100%; George: 30–40%; 40–50%; 50–60%; 60–70%; 70–80%; 80–90%; 90–100%; Finn: 40–50%; 50–60%; 60–70%; 90–100%; Tie: 30–40%; 40–50%; 50%; No Votes Cast

Republican primary results
Party	Candidate	Votes	%
Republican	Scott Jensen	258,740	66.7
Republican	Nate George	101,538	26.2
Republican	Will Finn	27,440	7.1
Total votes		387,718	100.0

== Third-party candidates ==
=== Candidates ===
==== Declared ====
- Jay Reeves (Forward-Independence Party), Army veteran

=== Endorsements ===
Jay Reeves

Political parties

- Forward-Independence Party

== General election ==
=== Polling ===
Poll source	Date(s) administered	Sample size	Margin of error	Zach Filipovich (DFL)	Scott Jensen (R)	Jay Reeves (FI)	Other	Undecided
KSTP/SurveyUSA	October 24–28, 2026	714 (LV)	± 4.2%	45%	39%	4%	–	12%
KSTP/SurveyUSA	October 8–12, 2026	718 (LV)	± 4.2%	41%	40%	5%	–	14%
KSTP/SurveyUSA	September 9–14, 2026	654 (LV)	± 4.4%	36%	43%	4%	—	17%
KSTP/SurveyUSA	August 13–17, 2026	661 (LV)	± 4.3%	39%	39%	—	3%	19%

=== Results ===
2026 Minnesota State Auditor election
Party	Candidate	Votes	%	±%
Democratic (DFL)	Zack Filipovich	1,473,978	52.93%	+5.46%
Republican	Scott Jensen	1,230,200	44.18%	−2.95%
Independence	Jay Reeves	79,000	2.84%	
Write-in		1,530	0.05%	0.00%
Total votes			100.0	
Democratic (DFL) hold				

==== By congressional district ====
Filipovich won four congressional districts, while Jensen won four congressional districts.

District	Filipovich	Jensen	Elected Representative
1st	44.57%	52.26%	Jake Johnson
2nd	53.21%	43.84%	Matt Little
3rd	59.09%	38.04%	Kelly Morrison
4th	69.02%	27.91%	Betty McCollum
5th	81.86%	15.42%	Ilhan Omar
6th	40.40%	56.66%	Tom Emmer
7th	31.32%	66.08%	Michelle Fischbach
8th	43.98%	53.20%	Pete Stauber
