= Dennis Frederickson =

American politician

Dennis R. Frederickson

Member of the Minnesota Senate from the 21st district
- In office January 6, 1981 – January 4, 2011
- Preceded by: Carl Jensen
- Succeeded by: Gary Dahms

Personal details
- Born: July 27, 1939 (age 87) Morgan, Minnesota
- Party: Republican
- Spouse: Marj
- Children: 3
- Education: University of Minnesota
- Occupation: Legislator, Farmer, Veteran

Dennis R. Frederickson (born July 27, 1939) is a Republican politician from Minnesota and a former Minnesota State Senator. He was first elected in 1980 when he ran for the seat being vacated by Senator Carl Jensen, who was appointed to the Minnesota Tax Court and did not seek re-election. He was re-elected each cycle between 1982 and 2006, receiving only one serious challenge for the position back in 1982 from former New Ulm mayor and state representative Tony Eckstein. His later re-election committees were chaired by former state senator Earl Renneke.

== Early life and education ==
Frederickson was born and raised on a farm in Redwood County near Morgan. He graduated from Morgan High School in 1957 and the University of Minnesota in 1961 with a B.S. degree in agricultural economics. After graduation, he spent five years on active duty in the U.S. Navy as a pilot. Following active duty, he flew in the Naval Air Reserve for three years, being honorably discharged with the rank of Lieutenant Commander.

Frederickson returned to the family farm in 1967 and was first elected to public office in 1972 as a Redwood County Commissioner, serving eight years. He served five years on the Redwood County Nursing Home Board, four as chairman, and is a former adult 4-H leader, Sunday school teacher, local Lions Club member and past president, and State Home Economics Advisory Council member. He also served on the Redwood Electric Cooperative Board of Directors for 20 years. He has since retired from farming and moved to New Ulm.

== Senate career ==
As state senator, Frederickson earned a reputation as a leader in issues relevant to environment and natural resources. He was a supporter of 2008 Minnesota Amendment 1.

Frederickson served on many Senate committees and on various relevant subcommittees. He a member of the Senate Environment and Natural Resources Committee for 26 years and of the Environment Budget Division for 24 years. He was President Pro Tempore of the Senate from January 2007 until his retirement. He also served on the Legislative-Citizen Commission on Minnesota Resources (LCCMR), which made recommendations to the Minnesota Legislature on how to spend money from the Environmental Trust Fund, and on the Legislative Commission on Planning and Fiscal Policy.

On March 30, 2010, Frederickson announced that he would not seek a tenth term in the Minnesota Senate.

== Personal life ==
Frederickson is a Lutheran and has three children. He was formerly a Presbyterian.
