= 2022 Minnesota State Auditor election =

- November 8, 2022
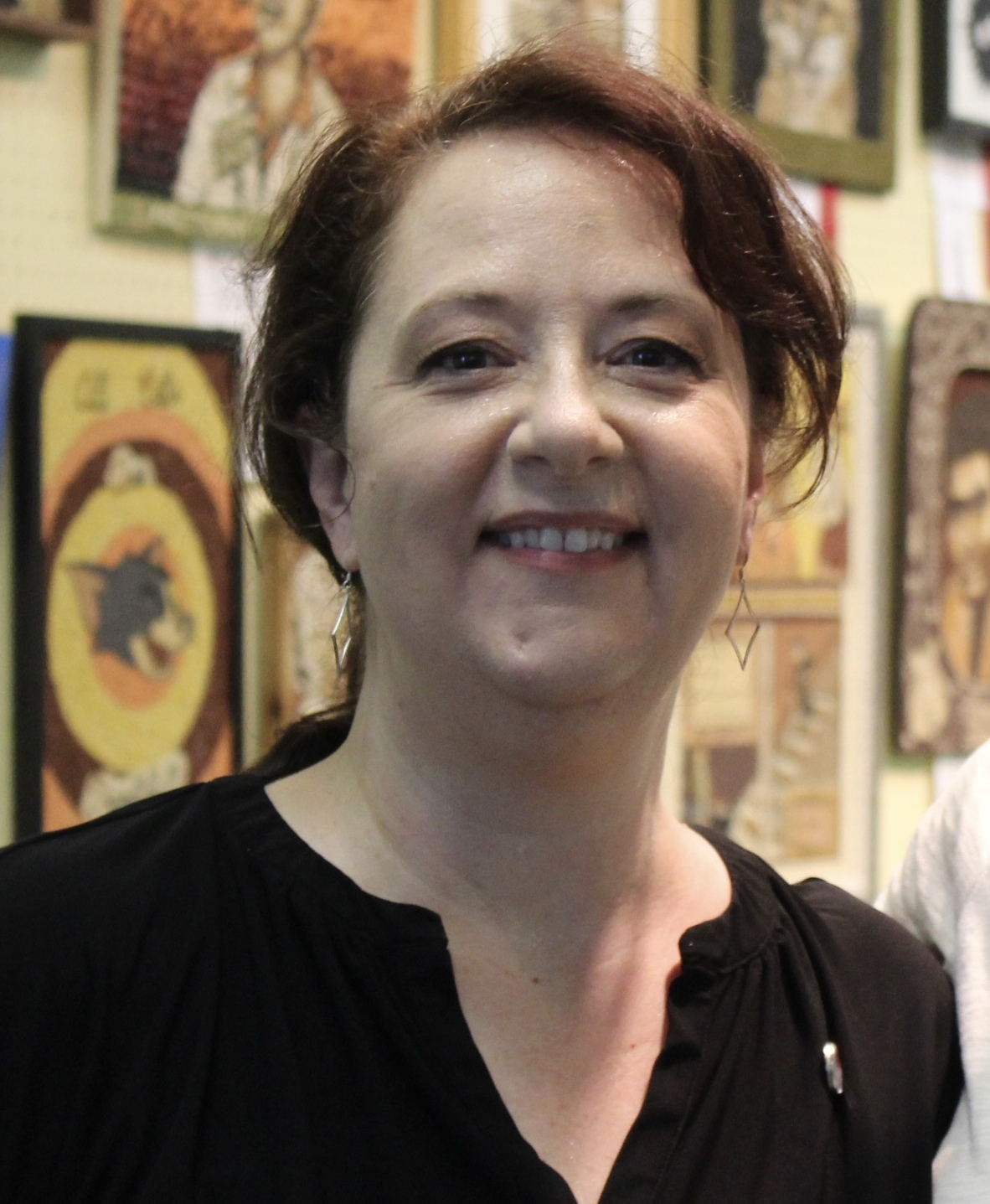

Nominee	Julie Blaha	Ryan Wilson
Party	Democratic (DFL)	Republican
Popular vote	1,168,185	1,159,750
Percentage	47.47%	47.13%
- Blaha: 40–50% 50–60% 60–70% 70–80% 80–90% >90% Wilson: 30–40% 40–50% 50–60% 60–70% 70–80% 80–90% >90% Tie: 50% No votes
State Auditor before election
Julie Blaha
Democratic (DFL)
Elected State Auditor
Julie Blaha
Democratic (DFL)

The 2022 Minnesota State Auditor election was held on November 8, 2022, to elect the state auditor of the U.S. state of Minnesota. Incumbent DFLer Julie Blaha narrowly won re-election to a second term.

Blaha was challenged by Republican candidate Ryan Wilson, Grassroot–Legalize Cannabis Party candidate Will Finn, and Legal Marijuana Now Party candidate Tim Davis.

This election was the second-closest for Minnesota State Auditor ever, after 1934.

== Background ==
In Minnesota, the state auditor is charged with supervising and auditing the finances of the state's approximately 4,800 local governments, which altogether tax and spend over $40 billion annually. Likewise, the state auditor performs under contract the annual single audit of nearly $26 billion in federal funds spent by state agencies and their subrecipients. The state auditor's authority transcends jurisdictions and applies to all local governments, be they counties, cities, towns, school districts, local pension funds, metropolitan and regional agencies, or myriad special purpose districts, and to every state agency that receives federal financial assistance.

=== Nature of the office ===
Since the elected constitutional office of state treasurer was eliminated in 2003, and despite the office's importance, the election for state auditor has been considered Minnesota's most "low-key" statewide race. Auditor races are obscure enough to earn headlines when a "real issue" emerges. Other analyses suggest that the auditor's office, which has lost half its staff since the 1990s, is Minnesota's "most overlooked and underfunded statewide office."

=== Synopsis of incumbent's tenure ===
In 2018, Julie Blaha, then secretary-treasurer of the Minnesota AFL–CIO, was elected to replace retiring fellow DFLer Rebecca Otto who unsuccessfully sought the DFL nomination for governor. As state auditor, Blaha was involved in uncovering and investigating a handful of public finance scandals, including an embezzlement scandal in Canton and Whalan and a conflict-of-interest case concerning the mayor of Two Harbors. Auditor Blaha was also publicly critical of Minnesota's civil asset forfeiture laws, arguing they were needlessly punitive for low-income suspects. She led a push to reform the laws which was ultimately successful in 2021.

== Candidates ==
The primary for State Auditor was uncontested.

=== Democratic–Farmer–Labor Party ===
Julie Blaha, incumbent State Auditor and former secretary-treasurer of the Minnesota AFL–CIO, announced her intention to run for election in November 2021. She won the Democratic–Farmer–Labor Party's endorsement unanimously at the party convention in May 2022.

==== Nominee ====
- Julie Blaha, incumbent State Auditor

=== Republican Party ===
Ryan Wilson, an attorney and former founder and CEO of a Minnesota-based clinical trial auditing firm, announced his candidacy in February 2022. Wilson, of Maple Grove, sought and received the endorsement of the Republican Party of Minnesota in May at the party's state convention.

==== Nominee ====
- Ryan Wilson, attorney, former CEO of Symbios Clinical

=== Grassroots–Legalize Cannabis Party ===
Kevin Finander, who appeared on ballots under the name Will Finn, was the nominee for the Grassroots–Legalize Cannabis Party. A self-described Libertarian, Finander was the chair of the Minnesota Taxation is Theft political action committee and a member of the South St. Paul library board.

==== Nominee ====
- Will Finn, Libertarian, member of the South St. Paul library board

=== Legal Marijuana Now Party ===
Longtime activist and Legal Marijuana Now Party chairman Tim Davis was his party's nominee in 2022. In an interview, Davis acknowledged that Auditor Blaha supported legalizing marijuana, but was committed to running nonetheless, arguing "[DFLers] haven't gotten anything done. We will be running. If we can get candidates, we will run.”

==== Nominee ====
- Tim Davis, activist and perennial candidate

== General election ==
=== Campaign issues ===
==== Feeding Our Future ====
Feeding Our Future, a now-dissolved Minnesota nonprofit, defrauded the state's USDA-funded school nutrition programs of at least $250 million over the course of the COVID-19 pandemic. On September 20, 2022, the U.S. Attorney Andrew M. Luger announced federal charges against 47 former Feeding Our Future employees for their involvement in the nation's largest pandemic-related fraud scheme. Republican nominee Ryan Wilson argued that DFL incumbent Auditor Julie Blaha could have minimized the fraud scheme's damage if her office had notified the federal authorities sooner of Feeding Our Future's internal control discrepancies. Auditor Blaha contended that her office is primarily designed for auditing local governments in Minnesota and that her office had submitted a report to the Minnesota Department of Education which noted that Feeding Our Future had not complied with standard auditing practice.

==== ESG investing ====
The Minnesota State Auditor is a member of the State Board of Investment (SBI), which oversees the state's $130 billion investment portfolio. As auditor, Julie Blaha had argued that the state should shift its investing strategies to meet so-called environmental, social, and corporate governance (ESG) guidelines. Blaha had argued that the state is a "long-term investor" that must focus on the potential long-term impacts of climate change and social inequities to maintain a stable investment portfolio. Wilson had argued that ESG investment is inherently political and that SBI should prioritize return on investment as a fiduciary over other public policy considerations, arguing Blaha was looking to "play politics" with state pensions.

=== Polling ===
Graphical summary

Poll source	Date(s) administered	Sample size (Note: Key: A – all adults RV – registered voters LV – likely voters V – unclear)	Margin of error	Julie Blaha (DFL)	Ryan Wilson (R)	Others	Undecided
SurveyUSA (Note: This poll was sponsored by KSTP-TV)	Oct. 26 – 30, 2022	836 (LV)	± 3.9%	39%	44%	3% (Note: "Other" polled at 3% with no candidate name given)	14%
Trafalgar Group (R) (Note: This poll was sponsored by Alpha News)	Oct. 17 – 19, 2022	1,091 (LV)	± 2.9%	40.4%	44.1%	6.0% (Note: Davis (LMN) with 3.8%, and Finn (GLC) with 2.2%)	9.5%
Embold Research	Oct. 10 – 14, 2022	1,585 (LV)	± 2.6%	40.4%	39.8%	6.1% (Note: Davis (LMN) with 3.3%, and Finn (GLC) with 2.8%)	13.7% (Note: "Not sure" with 11.9%, and "would not vote" with 1.8%)
SurveyUSA	Sep. 30 – Oct. 3, 2022	604 (LV)	± 4.4%	41%	38%	3%	18%
Trafalgar Group (R) (Note: This poll was sponsored by Alpha News)	Sep. 14, 2022	1,079 (LV)	± 2.9%	41.2%	42.3%	5.7% (Note: Davis (LMN) with 4.8%, and Finn (GLC) with 0.9%)	10.8%
SurveyUSA	Aug. 30 – Sep. 4, 2022	562 (LV)	± 4.9%	38%	37%	3%	23%

=== Results ===
2022 Minnesota State Auditor election
Party	Candidate	Votes	%	±%
Democratic (DFL)	Julie Blaha (incumbent)	1,168,185	47.47%	−1.88%
Republican	Ryan Wilson	1,159,750	47.13%	+3.90%
Legal Marijuana Now	Tim Davis	87,386	3.55%	−1.73%
Grassroots—LC	Will Finn	44,270	1.80%	N/A
Write-in		1,341	0.05%	+0.01%
Total votes		2,460,932	100.0%	
Democratic (DFL) hold				

==== By county ====
County	Julie Blaha DFL		Ryan Wilson GOP		Tim Davis LMN		Will Finn GLC		Write-in		Margin		Total votes
County	%	#	%	#	%	#	%	#	%	#	%	#	Total votes
Aitkin	32.31%	2,685	62.93%	5,229	3.26%	271	1.48%	123	0.01%	1	−30.62%	−2,544	8,309
Anoka	42.15%	64,825	51.21%	78,758	4.64%	7,133	1.94%	2,988	0.05%	80	−9.06%	−13,933	153,784
Becker	30.41%	4,435	64.80%	9,450	3.28%	479	1.47%	215	0.03%	5	−34.39%	−5,015	14,584
Beltrami	40.95%	7,306	52.92%	9,442	4.02%	717	2.09%	372	0.02%	4	−11.97%	−2,136	17,841
Benton	28.89%	4,652	65.09%	10,480	3.97%	640	1.99%	321	0.06%	9	−36.19%	−5,828	16,102
Big Stone	33.07%	792	62.13%	1,488	3.59%	86	1.13%	27	0.08%	2	−29.06%	−696	2,395
Blue Earth	46.81%	12,192	47.54%	12,382	3.97%	1,034	1.67%	434	0.02%	5	−0.73%	−190	26,047
Brown	28.81%	3,306	66.97%	7,686	2.77%	318	1.39%	159	0.06%	7	−38.17%	−4,380	11,476
Carlton	46.01%	7,188	47.55%	7,429	4.08%	637	2.25%	352	0.10%	16	−1.54%	−241	15,622
Carver	40.25%	21,247	55.00%	29,036	3.06%	1,614	1.66%	876	0.03%	18	−14.75%	−7,789	52,791
Cass	29.85%	4,492	65.11%	9,799	2.94%	443	2.07%	311	0.04%	6	−35.26%	−5,307	15,051
Chippewa	31.10%	1,521	64.44%	3,152	3.13%	153	1.29%	63	0.04%	2	−33.35%	−1,631	4,891
Chisago	31.83%	8,114	61.67%	15,720	4.45%	1,134	2.00%	510	0.04%	11	−29.84%	−7,606	25,489
Clay	47.58%	10,204	46.60%	9,995	3.95%	848	1.75%	376	0.12%	25	0.97%	209	21,448
Clearwater	23.59%	829	71.97%	2,529	3.02%	106	1.42%	50	0.00%	0	−48.38%	−1,700	3,514
Cook	64.10%	2,048	31.77%	1,015	2.47%	79	1.63%	52	0.03%	1	32.33%	1,033	3,195
Cottonwood	26.09%	1,190	68.95%	3,145	3.31%	151	1.53%	70	0.11%	5	−42.86%	−1,955	4,561
Crow Wing	31.24%	10,042	63.37%	20,367	3.78%	1,216	1.58%	508	0.02%	7	−32.13%	−10,325	32,140
Dakota	50.26%	99,090	44.70%	88,141	3.43%	6,758	1.52%	2,992	0.09%	187	5.55%	10,949	197,168
Dodge	31.12%	2,884	64.64%	5,991	2.51%	233	1.68%	156	0.04%	4	−33.52%	−3,107	9,268
Douglas	29.09%	5,642	67.18%	13,030	2.65%	514	1.05%	204	0.04%	7	−38.09%	−7,388	19,397
Faribault	28.61%	1,700	66.87%	3,974	2.98%	177	1.50%	89	0.05%	3	−38.26%	−2,274	5,943
Fillmore	35.11%	3,285	60.07%	5,621	3.14%	294	1.60%	150	0.07%	7	−24.97%	−2,336	9,357
Freeborn	36.31%	4,643	58.27%	7,451	3.70%	473	1.70%	217	0.02%	3	−21.96%	−2,808	12,787
Goodhue	37.94%	8,610	57.27%	12,995	3.03%	688	1.73%	392	0.03%	7	−19.32%	−4,385	22,692
Grant	33.81%	983	60.68%	1,764	3.72%	108	1.69%	49	0.10%	3	−26.87%	−781	2,907
Hennepin	64.66%	363,204	30.27%	170,033	3.28%	18,436	1.73%	9,719	0.06%	331	34.39%	193,171	561,723
Houston	38.46%	3,333	57.02%	4,941	3.28%	284	1.23%	107	0.01%	1	−18.56%	−1,608	8,666
Hubbard	32.00%	3,373	63.44%	6,686	2.90%	306	1.60%	169	0.05%	5	−31.44%	−3,313	10,539
Isanti	27.21%	5,040	65.49%	12,129	4.70%	871	2.53%	469	0.06%	11	−38.28%	−7,089	18,520
Itasca	39.25%	8,252	55.08%	11,580	3.85%	810	1.77%	372	0.04%	9	−15.83%	−3,328	21,023
Jackson	27.22%	1,226	68.18%	3,071	2.84%	128	1.73%	78	0.02%	1	−40.96%	−1,845	4,504
Kanabec	28.03%	1,962	65.19%	4,563	4.33%	303	2.41%	169	0.04%	3	−37.16%	−2,601	7,000
Kandiyohi	31.62%	5,692	63.89%	11,500	3.07%	552	1.40%	252	0.02%	4	−32.27%	−5,808	18,000
Kittson	34.17%	640	59.26%	1,110	4.54%	85	2.03%	38	0.00%	0	−25.09%	−470	1,873
Koochiching	36.07%	1,866	58.30%	3,016	3.65%	189	1.95%	101	0.02%	1	−22.23%	−1,150	5,173
Lac qui Parle	33.38%	1,040	63.09%	1,966	2.28%	71	1.16%	36	0.10%	3	−29.72%	−926	3,116
Lake	48.51%	2,727	45.95%	2,583	3.38%	190	2.10%	118	0.05%	3	2.56%	144	5,621
Lake of the Woods	24.79%	443	72.08%	1,288	2.24%	40	0.84%	15	0.06%	1	−47.29%	−845	1,787
Le Sueur	30.67%	3,979	63.64%	8,256	3.89%	505	1.77%	229	0.03%	4	−32.97%	−4,277	12,973
Lincoln	28.35%	683	67.29%	1,621	2.70%	65	1.62%	39	0.04%	1	−38.94%	−938	2,409
Lyon	30.78%	2,986	64.73%	6,280	3.15%	306	1.30%	126	0.04%	4	−33.95%	−3,294	9,702
Mahnomen	37.77%	613	55.95%	908	4.50%	73	1.66%	27	0.12%	2	−18.18%	−295	1,623
Marshall	24.37%	969	71.66%	2,850	2.59%	103	1.31%	52	0.08%	3	−47.30%	−1,881	3,977
Martin	25.81%	2,134	69.25%	5,726	3.62%	299	1.31%	108	0.01%	1	−43.44%	−3,592	8,268
McLeod	27.02%	4,371	67.59%	10,934	3.54%	573	1.82%	294	0.02%	4	−40.57%	−6,563	16,176
Meeker	26.81%	2,861	68.13%	7,270	3.29%	351	1.70%	181	0.07%	7	−41.32%	−4,409	10,670
Mille Lacs	27.34%	2,989	66.32%	7,251	4.29%	469	2.01%	220	0.05%	5	−38.98%	−4,262	10,934
Morrison	21.02%	3,205	74.89%	11,421	2.74%	418	1.34%	205	0.01%	2	−53.87%	−8,216	15,251
Mower	42.07%	5,855	51.81%	7,210	4.38%	609	1.69%	235	0.05%	7	−9.74%	−1,355	13,916
Murray	26.49%	1,020	70.01%	2,696	2.60%	100	0.86%	33	0.05%	2	−43.52%	−1,676	3,851
Nicollet	46.47%	6,984	48.64%	7,310	3.24%	487	1.60%	240	0.06%	9	−2.17%	−326	15,030
Nobles	28.44%	1,702	67.03%	4,011	3.09%	185	1.40%	84	0.03%	2	−38.59%	−2,309	5,984
Norman	37.16%	906	57.18%	1,394	3.81%	93	1.68%	41	0.16%	4	−20.02%	−488	2,438
Olmsted	50.46%	33,800	46.03%	30,835	2.22%	1,486	1.27%	852	0.02%	11	4.43%	2,965	66,984
Otter Tail	29.47%	8,296	66.14%	18,616	2.95%	829	1.41%	397	0.03%	8	−36.67%	−10,320	28,146
Pennington	31.56%	1,699	62.11%	3,344	4.42%	238	1.89%	102	0.02%	1	−30.55%	−1,645	5,384
Pine	30.87%	3,767	62.51%	7,629	4.64%	566	1.92%	234	0.07%	8	−31.65%	−3,862	12,204
Pipestone	22.14%	829	74.39%	2,786	2.38%	89	1.07%	40	0.03%	1	−52.26%	−1,957	3,745
Polk	30.22%	3,253	65.34%	7,033	3.08%	332	1.32%	142	0.04%	4	−35.12%	−3,780	10,764
Pope	32.16%	1,804	63.68%	3,572	2.78%	156	1.28%	72	0.09%	5	−31.52%	−1,768	5,609
Ramsey	65.44%	138,676	27.39%	58,035	4.47%	9,472	2.63%	5,569	0.07%	149	38.06%	80,641	211,901
Red Lake	29.68%	463	64.87%	1,012	4.04%	63	1.35%	21	0.06%	1	−35.19%	−549	1,560
Redwood	23.46%	1,489	72.08%	4,574	3.12%	198	1.31%	83	0.03%	2	−48.61%	−3,085	6,346
Renville	26.57%	1,650	67.75%	4,208	3.96%	246	1.67%	104	0.05%	3	−41.18%	−2,558	6,211
Rice	46.65%	13,040	48.33%	13,510	3.23%	903	1.76%	492	0.03%	7	−1.68%	−470	27,952
Rock	26.18%	1,068	70.21%	2,864	2.13%	87	1.45%	59	0.02%	1	−44.03%	−1,796	4,079
Roseau	22.89%	1,467	73.11%	4,685	2.82%	181	1.17%	75	0.00%	0	−50.22%	−3,218	6,408
Scott	39.90%	26,579	55.09%	36,698	3.55%	2,362	1.43%	950	0.03%	21	−15.19%	−10,119	66,610
Sherburne	29.34%	12,010	64.94%	26,582	3.82%	1,562	1.88%	770	0.03%	12	−35.60%	−14,572	40,936
Sibley	24.72%	1,608	70.40%	4,580	3.27%	213	1.58%	103	0.03%	2	−45.68%	−2,972	6,506
St. Louis	53.70%	49,010	39.79%	36,316	4.02%	3,665	2.43%	2,221	0.07%	62	13.91%	12,694	91,274
Stearns	33.19%	21,284	61.65%	39,533	3.33%	2,136	1.74%	1,117	0.08%	53	−28.46%	−18,249	64,123
Steele	34.55%	5,610	60.23%	9,781	3.37%	548	1.82%	296	0.02%	4	−25.69%	−4,171	16,239
Stevens	33.67%	1,343	62.75%	2,503	2.21%	88	1.35%	54	0.03%	1	−29.08%	−1,160	3,989
Swift	33.59%	1,302	61.95%	2,401	3.22%	125	1.19%	46	0.05%	2	−28.35%	−1,099	3,876
Todd	22.93%	2,457	72.00%	7,715	3.42%	366	1.59%	170	0.07%	7	−49.07%	−5,258	10,715
Traverse	29.36%	446	64.91%	986	3.95%	60	1.71%	26	0.07%	1	−35.55%	−540	1,519
Wabasha	32.53%	3,440	62.54%	6,613	3.22%	341	1.66%	176	0.04%	4	−30.01%	−3,173	10,574
Wadena	24.09%	1,426	71.53%	4,234	3.04%	180	1.33%	79	0.00%	0	−47.44%	−2,808	5,919
Waseca	30.12%	2,484	64.29%	5,302	3.82%	315	1.72%	142	0.05%	4	−34.17%	−2,818	8,247
Washington	48.45%	62,085	46.65%	59,772	3.08%	3,944	1.77%	2,267	0.05%	64	1.81%	2,313	128,132
Watonwan	32.95%	1,252	62.29%	2,367	3.00%	114	1.66%	63	0.11%	4	−29.34%	−1,115	3,800
Wilkin	26.88%	685	68.41%	1,743	3.30%	84	1.26%	32	0.16%	4	−41.52%	−1,058	2,548
Winona	45.00%	9,090	50.50%	10,201	3.06%	618	1.39%	280	0.05%	10	−5.50%	−1,111	20,199
Wright	30.38%	19,624	63.64%	41,114	3.83%	2,472	2.11%	1,365	0.04%	29	−33.26%	−21,490	64,604
Yellow Medicine	27.50%	1,189	67.85%	2,933	3.28%	142	1.34%	58	0.02%	1	−40.34%	−1,744	4,323
Totals	47.47%	1,168,185	47.13%	1,159,750	3.55%	87,386	1.80%	44,270	0.05%	1,341	0.34%	8,435	2,460,932

Counties that flipped from Democratic to Republican

- Blue Earth (largest city: Mankato)
- Carlton (largest municipality: Cloquet)
- Mahnomen (largest city: Mahnomen)
- Mower (largest city: Austin)
- Nicollet (largest city: North Mankato)
- Rice (largest city: Faribault)
- Winona (largest city: Winona)

==== By congressional district ====
Despite losing the state, Wilson won five of eight congressional districts, including one that elected a Democrat.

District	Blaha	Wilson	Representative
1st	40%	55%	Brad Finstad
2nd	47%	48%	Angie Craig
3rd	53%	42%	Dean Phillips
4th	61%	32%	Betty McCollum
5th	76%	18%	Ilhan Omar
6th	35%	59%	Tom Emmer
7th	29%	66%	Michelle Fischbach
8th	40%	54%	Pete Stauber

== Aftermath ==
On November 9, the day after the election, Blaha claimed victory in Minnesota's closest race of the year. She released a statement, reading in part: "Our victory is a message that Minnesotans want their auditor to continue to focus on local government, to ultimately protect our freedom to make decisions in our own communities."

Ryan Wilson conceded the same day, saying that he planned to return to practicing law and fundraising for a baseball stadium at Hamel in Medina.

The 8,435-vote margin was slightly above the threshold for an automatic recount.

== See also ==
- 2022 Minnesota elections
