= Carl Jensen (politician) =

American politician (1920–1988)

Judge of the Minnesota Tax Court
- In office February 2, 1981 – July 10, 1986
- Appointed by: Al Quie

Member of the Minnesota Senate from the 28th district 17th (1967-1973)
- In office January 3, 1967 – January 5, 1981
- Preceded by: John Zwach
- Succeeded by: Dennis Frederickson

Member of the Minnesota House of Representatives from the 14th district
- In office January 2, 1951 – January 2, 1961
- Preceded by: William V. Burroughs
- Succeeded by: Harvey Paulson

Personal details
- Born: December 11, 1920 Sleepy Eye, Minnesota, U.S.
- Died: May 4, 1988 (aged 67) Arden Hills, Minnesota, U.S.
- Party: Republican (until 1986)
- Other political affiliations: Democratic (after 1986)
- Spouse: Patricia (second wife)
- Children: 8, including Scott
- Education: University of Minnesota (BA, JD)

Military service
- Allegiance: United States
- Branch/service: United States Air Force
- Years of service: 1942–1945
- Rank: Staff Sergeant
- Battles/wars: World War II; American Theater

Carl Arthur Jensen (December 11, 1920 – May 4, 1988) was a Minnesota politician, attorney, and veteran. Jensen served as a member of the Minnesota House of Representatives and the Minnesota Senate representing part of southwestern Minnesota during the 1950s until the 1980s. Jensen was a member of the Republican Party who later switched to become a Democrat at the end of his life.

Jensen, after leaving elected office, served on the Minnesota Tax Court from 1981 until 1986, appointed by then-Governor and fellow Republican Al Quie.

== Early life and education ==
Carl Arthur Jensen was born in Sleepy Eye, Minnesota. He served in the United States Army Air Force during World War II. After returning from the war, he attended law school at the University of Minnesota and graduated with honors in 1949. Once admitted to the bar, he engaged in private practice, and also served as attorney for the Sleepy Eye School District for nine years, and for the City of Sleepy Eye for 14 years.

== Political career ==
In 1966, after several years away from public service, Jensen ran successfully for the District 17 state senate seat being vacated by John M. Zwach, Sr., who was running for the U.S. Congress. District 17 later became District 28 after redistricting in 1970, and included all or portions of Brown, Cottonwood, Murray, Nicollet and Redwood counties. He was re-elected in 1970, 1972 and 1976.

As representative and senator, Jensen allied with the House Conservative Caucus at a time when the legislature was still officially nonpartisan. He later identified as Republican when major party affiliation became common. His key areas of interest were agriculture, commerce, the judiciary, and taxes and tax laws.

While in the senate, Jensen served on the Commerce, Elections, Environment & Natural Resources, General Legislation, Health, Welfare & Corrections, Judiciary, Public Highways, Rules & Administration, and Taxes & Tax Laws committees, and on various other committee incarnations and subcommittees. He was chair of the General Legislation Committee from 1971 to 1973, and was an assistant minority leader from 1977 to 1981. He also served on the Minnesota Voyageurs National Park Commission during the 1970s.

Jensen did not to run for re-election in 1980, as he was appointed to the Minnesota Tax Court by Minnesota Governor Albert Quie. He served on the tax court from 1981 to 1986. In 1986, he ran unsuccessfully as a Minnesota Democratic-Farmer-Labor Party candidate for the Minnesota Senate.

== Personal life ==
After the death of his first wife in 1977, Jensen remarried in 1979. His second wife, Patricia, was a member of Governor Quie's staff. He was the father of five children and three stepchildren. Jensen died of cancer in 1988 at his home in Arden Hills.
