= Joseph Karth =

American politician

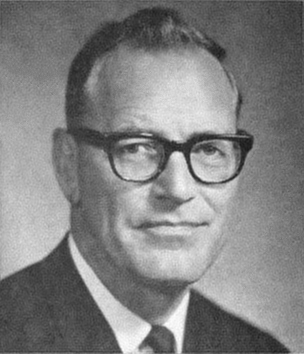
Joseph E. Karth

Joseph Edward Karth (August 26, 1922 – May 29, 2005) was a U.S. representative from Minnesota. He was a member of the Democratic Party.

Born in New Brighton, Ramsey County, Minnesota; all four of his grandparents were German immigrants. He attended public schools and the University of Nebraska School of Engineering; interrupted his education during the Second World War to serve in the United States Army, with service in the European Theater of Operations; employed by the Minnesota Mining & Manufacturing Company; international representative of OCAW-AFL-CIO 1947–1958; member of the Minnesota House of Representatives, 1950–1958; elected as a member of the Democratic-Farmer-Labor Party to the 86th, 87th, 88th, 89th, 90th, 91st, 92nd, 93rd, and 94th congresses, (January 3, 1959 – January 3, 1977); was not a candidate for reelection to the 95th Congress in 1976; established a consulting firm; died on May 29, 2005, in Scottsdale, Arizona.

U.S. House of Representatives
Preceded by Eugene McCarthy	U.S. Representative from Minnesota's 4th congressional district 1959–1977	Succeeded by Bruce Vento
