= George L. Siegel =

American politician (1885–1963)

George L. Siegel (August 21, 1885 – January 23, 1963) was an American lawyer and politician.

Siegel was born in Saint Paul, Minnesota and went to the Saint Paul public schools. He received his law degree from St. Paul College of Law (William Mitchell College of Law) in 1911 and practiced law in Saint Paul, Minnesota. Siegel served in the Minnesota House of Representatives from 1917 to 1920 and in the Minnesota Senate from 1931 to 1954.
