= Scott Jensen (Minnesota politician) =

American politician and physician

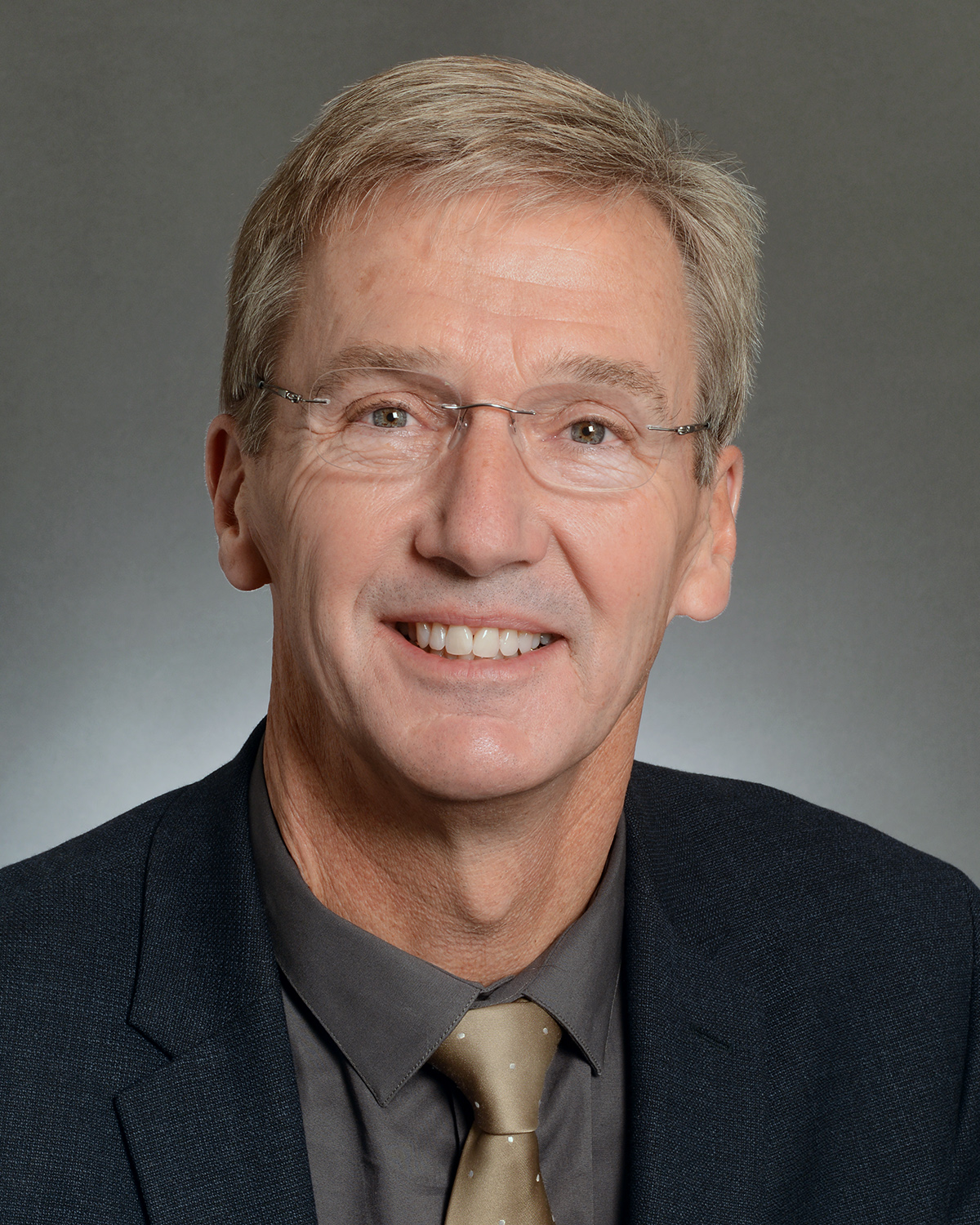
- Jensen in 2016

Member of the Minnesota Senate from the 47th district
- In office January 3, 2017 – January 5, 2021
- Preceded by: Julianne Ortman
- Succeeded by: Julia Coleman

Personal details
- Born: Scott Mitchell Jensen; November 19, 1954 (age 71) Sleepy Eye, Minnesota, U.S.
- Party: Republican
- Spouse: Mary
- Children: 3
- Relatives: Carl Jensen (father)
- Education: Luther Seminary (attended); University of Minnesota (BA, MD)

Scott Mitchell Jensen (born November 19, 1954) is an American physician and politician. A member of the Republican Party, he served in the Minnesota Senate from 2017 to 2021. He was the Republican nominee for governor in 2022.

Jensen was born and raised in Sleepy Eye, Minnesota. He earned his M.D. from the University of Minnesota. Jensen practices family medicine at his clinic in Watertown, Minnesota. During the 1990s and 2000s, he served on the Waconia school board. Jensen was elected to the state senate in 2016 from a district covering part of Carver County, Minnesota, on the outskirts of the Minneapolis-Saint Paul metropolitan area. During his term in the legislature, he was regarded as moderate. After leaving the legislature, his views shifted to the right. During the COVID-19 pandemic, Jensen was known for his criticisms of COVID-19 lockdowns and promotion of COVID-19 anti-vaccination falsehoods. He chose not to seek reelection in 2020.

In 2021, Jensen announced his bid to challenge incumbent Democratic governor Tim Walz in the 2022 Minnesota gubernatorial election. He later selected former professional football player Matt Birk as his running mate. Jensen secured the Republican nomination in the August 2022 primary election. He and Birk lost to Walz and Lieutenant Governor Peggy Flanagan in the general election.

== Early life and medical career ==
Jensen was born on November 19, 1954. His father, Carl Jensen, was a member of the state legislature at various times between 1951 and 1980.

Jensen graduated as the valedictorian from Sleepy Eye High School in Sleepy Eye, Minnesota, in 1973. He attended Luther Northwestern Theological Seminary from 1977 to 1978 and the University of Minnesota, graduating with a Bachelor of Arts in physiology in 1978 and a Doctor of Medicine in 1981. He was a Bush Fellow of leadership and policy studies at the University of Minnesota in 1999. Jensen was a professor at the University of Minnesota Medical School and has had a small family medical practice in Watertown, Minnesota, since 1986. He was a member of the Citizens Alliance Bank board, serving as the audit committee chair. He was the 2016 Minnesota Family Physician of the Year.

== Political career ==
Jensen became involved in politics as a supporter of John Anderson, and later Republican Ronald Reagan, in the 1980 presidential election. In the 1990s and 2000s, he served on the school board in Waconia, Minnesota, and chaired the local Republican Party.

=== Minnesota Senate ===
Jensen was elected to the Minnesota Senate in 2016 representing part of Carver County. He ran as a traditional conservative Republican, opposing abortion and favoring low taxes. During his single term in the legislature, he was regarded as moderate and pro-business, receiving a perfect score from the Minnesota Chamber of Commerce in 2017 and 2018. He was seen as "an eccentric and unpredictable legislator"; and as among the more bipartisan members of the Minnesota Senate, with a reputation as a political maverick. Jensen supported a bill to allow local governments to adopt ranked-choice voting, a system some Republicans had attempted to prohibit in the state. He put forward a bill to regulate pharmacy benefit managers, and to create a new commission to probe drug price increases. Voting against his party, he supported a ban on conversion therapy.

Jensen received media attention in 2017 after providing medical attention to Governor Mark Dayton after Dayton collapsed while giving his State of the State address on the floor of the Minnesota House of Representatives in the Minnesota State Capitol.

In July 2019, Jensen announced that he would not seek reelection in 2020.

=== Minnesota gubernatorial campaign ===
==== 2022 gubernatorial campaign ====
In January 2021, just after he retired from the State Senate, Jensen was viewed as a potential Republican candidate for governor in the 2022 election, challenging Democratic incumbent Tim Walz, and said he planned to decide whether to run in the coming months. In March 2021, Jensen announced his candidacy. He named former Minnesota Vikings player Matt Birk as his running mate. He took an early polling and fundraising lead among Republican candidates in the primary, running against former Senate Majority Leader Paul Gazelka, Lexington Mayor Mike Murphy, and others. (State Senator Michelle Benson also sought the nomination, but dropped out of the race.) Jensen won a Carver County Republican Party straw poll by a wide margin during the 2022 Republican primary campaign for governor.

In May 2022, Jensen attacked Minnesota Secretary of State Steve Simon for his operation of the state's election system, suggesting that Simon should go "to jail" without providing any evidence that Simon had done anything illegal. Jensen's comments were part of a larger trend of Republican candidates casting doubt on election results in the wake of Donald Trump's false claim that the 2020 election was rigged against him, a falsehood promoted by many Republican candidates and believed by many Republican voters. Simon called Jensen's comments "bizarre and irresponsible" and "a cynical attempt to use extreme conspiracy theories to radicalize political supporters."

At the May 2022 Minnesota Republican convention, Jensen won the party's endorsement on the ninth round of voting among the 2,100 delegates, defeating Lexington Mayor Mike Murphy and businessman Kendall Qualls. In the August 2022 primary election, Jensen faced only minor opposition. In the November 8 general election, Jensen lost to incumbent governor Tim Walz by over seven percentage points, 52.3% to 44.6%. He fared better than Walz's opponent had in 2018 and made gains against Walz in Greater Minnesota, but he did not overcome Walz's wide lead in the Minneapolis–Saint Paul metropolitan area.

==== 2026 campaigns ====
On July 17, 2025, Jensen announced his candidacy for governor in the 2026 Minnesota gubernatorial election. On February 9, 2026, he dropped out of the gubernatorial race to instead run for state auditor.

== Political positions ==
Jensen had a reputation as a moderate Republican during his tenure in the Minnesota Senate, but his views later shifted further to the right. Jensen's shift surprised allies and reflected a broader movement of the Republican Party under Donald Trump.

=== Abortion ===
While campaigning for the governorship, when asked about the potential reversal of Roe v. Wade, Jensen said that if elected, "I would try to ban abortion." He said that he supported a ban of all abortions unless a mother's life is in danger, with no exemptions for cases of rape or incest. Jensen's running mate, Matt Birk, has said that women "always want to go to the rape card" and opposed abortions for rape victims. Later in his 2022 campaign, Jensen moderated his position on abortion, taking a stance that would permit several exceptions. In a September 2022 television ad and in public appearances, he referred to the Minnesota Supreme Court's 1995 decision Doe v. Gomez, which held that abortion in Minnesota is a protected constitutional right; Jensen noted that the governor lacked the power to change that ruling, and that he was not running to do so.

=== Cannabis ===
While in the Senate, Jensen supported holding an informational hearing on Senator Melisa Franzen's and Representative Mike Freiberg's bill to legalize marijuana in Minnesota. He said he did not endorse the bill's content, despite being one of its cosponsors.

=== COVID-19 pandemic ===
In an April 2020 appearance on Fox News's The Ingraham Angle, Jensen incorrectly stated that the U.S. COVID-19 death toll was being inflated; experts said that the COVID-19 death toll was more likely an undercount. President Donald Trump amplified the claim during his 2020 campaign. PolitiFact cited Jensen as a contributor to their "Lie of the Year 2020: Coronavirus downplay and denial" for the claims.

According to Jensen, complaints were made to the Minnesota Board of Medical Practice about his public statements on COVID-19. In July 2022, Jensen said he had been investigated five times. He said the Board had been "weaponized" against him and that "this juggernaut [the Board] will be dealt with" should he be elected, referencing the governor's responsibility to appoint the Board's members. In 2023, Jensen sued the Board of Medical Practice, claiming that the investigations were "retaliation" for his "protected free speech". The Board of Medical Practice is legally required to investigate every complaint it receives.

Jensen aligned himself with the COVID-19 anti-vaccination movement. In May 2021, he sued the U.S. Department of Health and Human Services in an attempt to prevent children from receiving COVID-19 vaccinations. His fellow plaintiffs in the suit included anti-vaccine activist Simone Gold and the right-wing political organization America's Frontline Doctors (AFD). AFD had attracted notoriety for its promotion of false and misleading COVID-19 claims. The complaint, filed in federal court in Alabama, falsely called the COVID-19 vaccines a dangerous "experimental biological agent". The affidavit claimed that "it would be reckless to subject anyone in that age group to the experimental COVID-19 vaccine", and Jensen said that giving children the vaccine "would violate his oath as a doctor and place him in an untenable position". In a later interview, Jensen said he had "quietly" been a member of AFD and had been unaware of the involvement of the group's founder, Gold, in the January 6 United States Capitol attack. He also said he did not read the whole petition before signing it. In the same interview, Jensen said, against medical consensus, that he does not recommend COVID-19 vaccines for "young and healthy" people. He was banned from TikTok in April 2021 and restricted from advertising on Facebook in July 2021 for violating community guidelines barring the promotion of COVID-19 misinformation.

Jensen's views were mentioned in the 2020 COVID-19 conspiracy-theory video Plandemic. He was a member of the World Doctors Alliance, an international fringe group that promoted false and conspiratorial claims about COVID-19. Jensen has questioned the medical and scientific consensus that ivermectin and hydroxychloroquine are ineffective against COVID-19. In September 2021, he called on "ALL Minnesota citizens and businesses to participate in civil disobedience" by ignoring a Biden administration proposal to require large employers to ensure that their employees were either vaccinated against COVID-19 or took weekly COVID-19 tests.

=== Crime and guns ===
In 2018, Jensen proposed various gun control measures in the state legislature to expand universal background checks and require that lost or stolen firearms be reported to authorities. Gun rights advocacy groups condemned his proposals. In 2022, Jensen said at the Republican Party convention that he had been on the "wrong side" of the issue and apologized for his past support of gun control measures. He has also called for hiring more police officers.

In 2022, Jensen pledged that, if elected governor, he would commute the sentence of Kim Potter, a police officer convicted of killing Daunte Wright at a traffic stop in 2021. However, a governor alone cannot commute sentences in Minnesota. It is necessary to gain unanimous support from the three-member Board of Pardons, consisting of the governor, the attorney general, and the Minnesota Supreme Court's chief justice.

=== Economic policy ===
Jensen has advocated tax cuts and spending decreases. During his 2022 campaign for governor, he called for eliminating Minnesota's state personal income tax and "dramatically reducing" state expenditures.

=== Other ===
Running for Senate in 2016, Jensen expressed support for abolishing the Met Council, a regional governmental agency covering the Minneapolis–Saint Paul metropolitan area. In 2022, he said the council would be "coming down" if he were elected governor.

While campaigning for governor in 2022, Jensen proposed a school voucher program. Although he did not release funding figures for a plan, a nonpartisan fiscal analysis for a similar proposal by Minnesota State Senate Republicans estimated that such a program would shift $178 million from public schools to private schools over two years.

While running for governor, Jensen called for a repeal of Minnesota's Clean Car rule, a rule (set to take effect in 2024) that limits carbon emissions from motor vehicle and requires automakers to introduce more hybrid and electric vehicles into Minnesota. His energy proposal made no mention of climate change.

Jensen has criticized the use of medical procedures for transgender teenagers and has opposed gender identify affirmation in schools. In a September 2022 campaign speech, he falsely claimed that some schools provide litter boxes for children who identify as furries.

== Personal life ==
Jensen and his wife, Mary, have three children and reside in Laketown Township.

Party political offices
Preceded by Jeff Johnson	Republican nominee for Governor of Minnesota; 2022	Succeeded by Lisa Demuth
Preceded by Ryan Wilson	Republican nominee for Auditor of Minnesota; 2026	Most recent
