= Zack Filipovich =

American politician (born 1990)

- Filipovich in 2026

20th Auditor of Minnesota
- Elect
- Assuming office January 4, 2027
- Governor: Amy Klobuchar (elect)
- Succeeding: Julie Blaha

Personal details
- Born: May 6, 1990 (age 36) Duluth, Minnesota, U.S.
- Party: Democratic (DFL)
- Education: University of Minnesota Duluth (B.Acc., MBA)
- Website: Campaign website

Zack Filipovich (born May 6, 1990) is a American politician and accountant who served as a member of the Duluth City Council. A member of the Minnesota Democratic–Farmer–Labor Party, he is the Minnesota State Auditor-elect.

== Early life and career ==
Filipovich in 2026

Filipovich was born and raised in Duluth, Minnesota, graduating from Duluth Central High School. He graduated from the University of Minnesota Duluth, earning a Bachelor of Accounting degree. He also earned his Master of Business Administration in 2024 from the same University.

In 2022, Filipovich joined management consultant firm Northspan Group as a consultant and finance manager.

== Duluth City Council ==
Filipovich first ran for the Duluth City Council in 2013 to succeed Dan Hartman. When he took office on January 8, 2014 at 23 years old, he becamse the city's youngest councilmember ever elected and also the youngest councilmember to chair the City Council when he was elevated to Council President in 2016. He was re-elected in 2017 and retired in 2021. He was the top vote earner in a field of 4 candidates in both 2013 and 2017. He served until January 7, 2022, when he was succeeded by Azrin Awal.

In December 2023, outgoing mayor Emily Larson announced her appointment of Filipovich to the Duluth Entertainment Convention Center board, which incoming mayor Roger Reinert requested the council deny so he could fill the seat when his term began in January 2024. The council approved the appointment unanimously.

== State auditor ==
Filipovich ran for Minnesota State Auditor in the 2026 election. He won the election, defeating Scott Jensen. He is the first Minnesotan from north of the Twin Cities metropolitan area to win statewide office in four decades.

Party political offices
Preceded by Julie Blaha	Democratic nominee for Auditor of Minnesota; 2026	Most recent
Political offices
Preceded by Julie Blaha	Auditor of Minnesota; Taking office 2027	Elect
