= Minnesota's congressional districts =

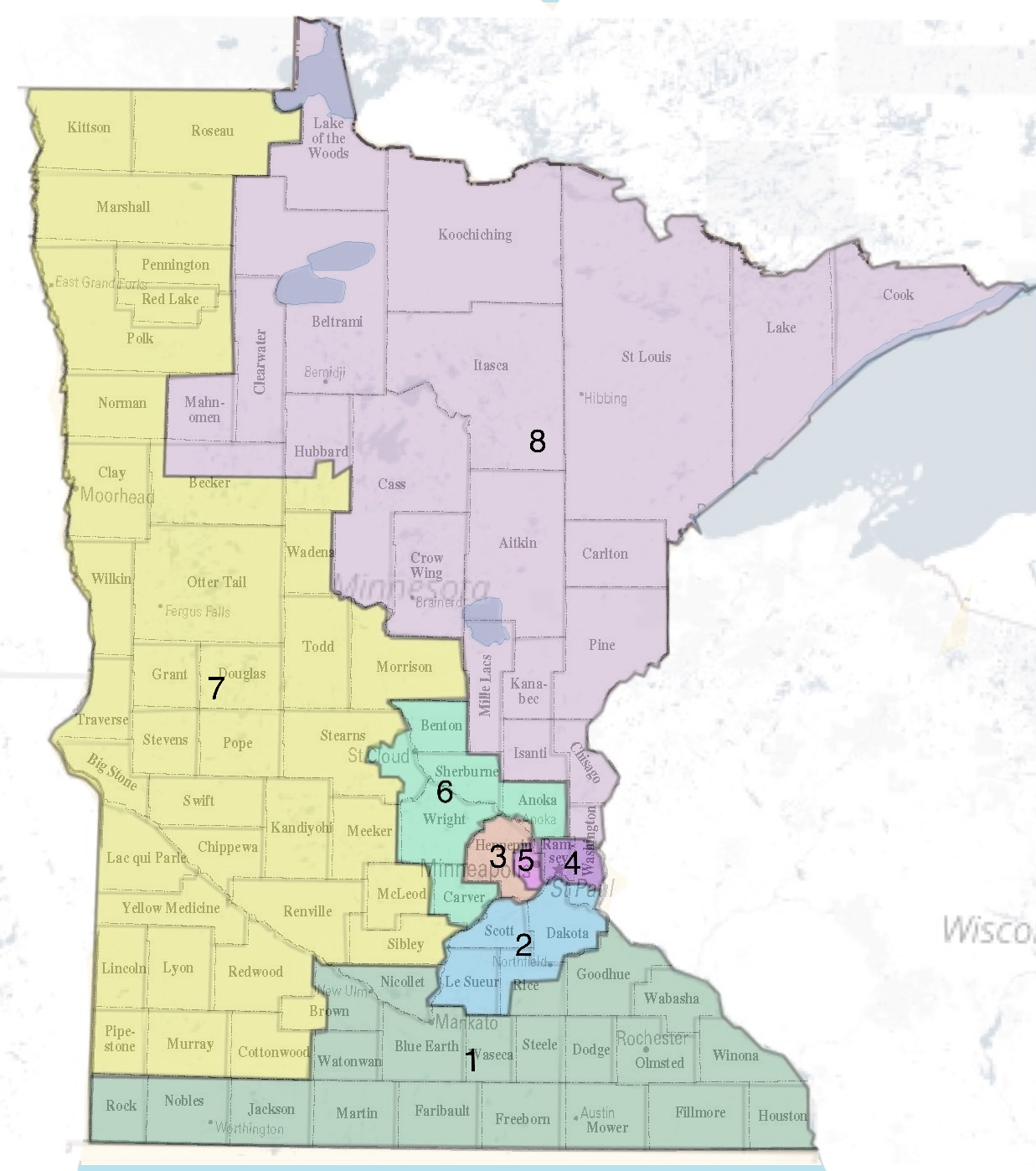
Map of Minnesota's congressional districts from 2023 Interactive map version

Minnesota is currently divided into eight congressional districts, each represented by a member of the United States House of Representatives. After the 2020 census, the number of Minnesota's seats remained unchanged.

Minnesota statutes do not require candidates for the United States House of Representatives to reside in the district in which they run for office, but candidates must be inhabitants of the state at the time of the election.

== Current districts and representatives ==
This is a list of United States representatives from Minnesota, their terms, their district boundaries, and the district political ratings according to the CPVI. The delegation has a total of eight members, consisting of four Democrats and four Republicans.

Current U.S. representatives from Minnesota
District	Member (Residence)	Party	Incumbent since	CPVI (2025)	District map
1st	Brad Finstad (New Ulm)	Republican	August 12, 2022	R+6	
2nd	Angie Craig (Prior Lake)	Democratic (DFL)	January 3, 2019	D+3	
3rd	Kelly Morrison (Wayzata)	Democratic (DFL)	January 3, 2025	D+11	
4th	Betty McCollum (Saint Paul)	Democratic (DFL)	January 3, 2001	D+18	
5th	Ilhan Omar (Minneapolis)	Democratic (DFL)	January 3, 2019	D+32	
6th	Tom Emmer (Delano)	Republican	January 3, 2015	R+10	
7th	Michelle Fischbach (Regal)	Republican	January 3, 2021	R+18	
8th	Pete Stauber (Hermantown)	Republican	January 3, 2019	R+7	

== Historical and present district boundaries ==
Table of United States congressional district boundary maps in the State of Minnesota, presented chronologically. All redistricting events that took place in Minnesota between 1973 and 2013 are shown.

Year	Statewide map	Minneapolis–St. Paul Metro Area highlight
1862–1872		
1872–1874		
1874–1882		
1882–1892		
1892–1902		
1902–1913		
1913-1931		
1931-1933	Governor Floyd Olson vetoed the legislature's congressional redistricting bill, upheld in Smiley v. Holm. Because the state lost its 10th congressional district in reapportionment, the 1932 House elections in Minnesota were held at-large.	
1933-1962		
1962-1973		
1973–1982		
1983–1992		
1993–1994		
1995–2002		
2003–2013		
2013-2023		
Since 2023		

== Obsolete districts ==
=== Districts ===
Minnesota currently has eight congressional districts. There were 9th and 10th districts but they were eliminated in 1963 and 1933 respectively. Redistricting is done every 10 years to reflect population shifts within the United States.

- 9th district: 1903–1933, 1935–1963 (obsolete since the 1960 census)
- 10th district: 1915–1933 (obsolete since the 1930 census)

Minnesota is projected to lose its 8th congressional district after the 2030 Census, based on analysis of yearly Census Bureau population estimates. Minnesota narrowly avoided the same fate after the 2020 Census.

== Importance in state government ==
Congressional districts are also used to ensure regional representation on other government bodies within the state. The following entities are required by state statute to have at least one member from each congressional district:

- The Minnesota Court of Appeals (based on a judge's place of residence for a minimum of one year upon initial appointment or election).
- The Board of Regents of the University of Minnesota.
- The Minnesota State Colleges and Universities System Board of Trustees.
- The state Board of Invention.

== See also ==
- List of United States congressional districts
