= Julie Blaha =

American teacher and politician

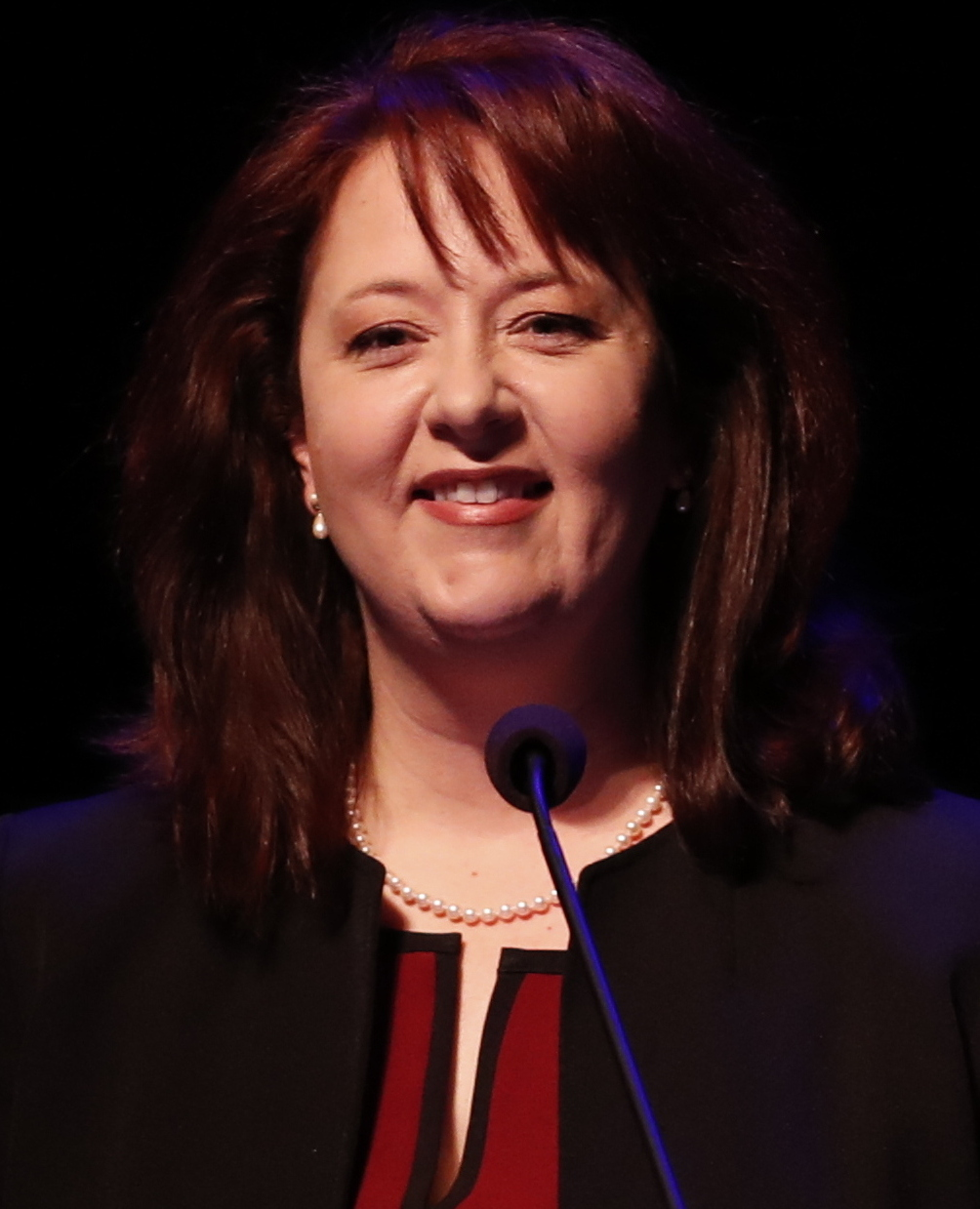
- Blaha in 2019

19th Auditor of Minnesota
- Incumbent
- Assumed office January 7, 2019
- Governor: Tim Walz
- Preceded by: Rebecca Otto

Personal details
- Born: May 2, 1970 (age 56) Burns Township, Minnesota, U.S.
- Party: Democratic
- Education: St. Cloud State University (BS); Saint Mary's University, Minnesota (MEd)
- Website: Campaign website

Julie Blaha (born May 2, 1970) is an American politician and retired educator serving as the 19th state auditor of Minnesota since 2019. She is a member of the Minnesota Democratic–Farmer–Labor Party. Before her election as auditor, Blaha served as secretary-treasurer of the Minnesota AFL–CIO, a federation of local trade unions.

== Biography ==
Born in Burns Township, Minnesota (now the city of Nowthen), Blaha earned a Bachelor of Science from St. Cloud State University and a Master of Education (MEd) from Saint Mary's University of Minnesota. She worked as a middle school math teacher and secretary-treasurer of the Minnesota AFL–CIO.

In the 2018 elections, Blaha ran for Minnesota state auditor and defeated Republican state representative Pam Myhra in the general election. She was sworn into office on January 7, 2019. Blaha was narrowly reelected in 2022, defeating Republican nominee Ryan Wilson by 9,435 votes out of 2.46 million cast. In September 2025, Blaha announced that she would not seek a third term.

Blaha and her husband, Roger, live in Ramsey, Minnesota. They have two sons and four grandchildren.

== Electoral history ==
2018 Minnesota State Auditor election
Party	Candidate	Votes	%
Democratic (DFL)	Julie Blaha	1,250,524	49.35
Republican	Pam Myhra	1,095,310	43.23
Legal Marijuana Now	Michael Ford	133,913	5.28
Libertarian	Chris Dock	53,068	2.09
Write-in		1,125	0.04
Total votes		2,533,940	100.00

2022 Minnesota State Auditor election
Party	Candidate	Votes	%
Democratic (DFL)	Julie Blaha (incumbent)	1,168,185	47.47
Republican	Ryan Wilson	1,159,750	47.13
Legal Marijuana Now	Tim Davis	87,386	3.55
Grassroots—LC	Will Finn	44,270	1.80
Write-in		1,341	0.05
Total votes		2,460,932	100.00

Party political offices
Preceded by Rebecca Otto	Democratic nominee for Auditor of Minnesota; 2018, 2022	Succeeded by Zack Filipovich
Political offices
Preceded by Rebecca Otto	Auditor of Minnesota; 2019–present	Incumbent
