= Minnesota's 2nd congressional district =

U.S. House district for Minnesota

Coordinates: 44°28′44″N 92°51′11″W

- Interactive map of district boundaries since January 3, 2023
- Representative: Angie Craig; DFL–Prior Lake
- Area: 3,035 mi^{2} (7,860 km^{2})
- Distribution: 86.97% urban; 13.03% rural
- Population (2025): 749,210
- Median household income: $116,680
- Ethnicity: 75.3% White; 7.6% Hispanic; 6.2% Black; 5.6% Asian; 4.3% Two or more races; 1.0% other
- Cook PVI: D+3

Minnesota's 2nd congressional district covers the south Twin Cities metro area and contains all of Scott, Dakota, and Le Sueur counties. It also contains part of northern and eastern Rice County including the city of Northfield, as well as southern Washington County including the city of Cottage Grove. Lakeville and Eagan are the largest cities in the district. Historically, for many decades in the mid 20th century the 2nd congressional district covered the southwest corner of the state, while the 1st congressional district covered most of this part of the state.

Three of Minnesota's most important rivers run through the district — the Mississippi River, the Minnesota River, and the St. Croix River. Interstate highways I-35 E and I-35 W merge in the district in addition to the north–south thoroughfares of U.S. Routes 169, 61, and 52 and the east–west Route 212. The suburban areas in the northern part of the district blend into the rural farmland in the south. The district's economy includes agriculture, small businesses, and large corporations.

Some of the largest employers in the district are Thomson Reuters, Blue Cross and Blue Shield of Minnesota, 3M, Cambria, and Red Wing Shoes. The district includes Pine Bend Refinery, the largest oil refinery in Minnesota, owned by Koch Industries.

The 2nd district is also home to two private liberal arts colleges: St. Olaf and Carleton, both in Northfield. Shakopee is home to Minnesota's largest amusement park, Valleyfair, as well as Canterbury Park.

Minnesota's 2nd congressional district is currently represented by Democrat Angie Craig, who defeated incumbent Republican Jason Lewis in the 2018 election. The district is considered to be highly competitive. Between 2000 and 2020, the district was a presidential bellwether, voting for the winner each time. This trend was broken in 2024, when the district favored Kamala Harris over winner Donald Trump.

== History ==
For most of its existence the district was based in the southwest corner of the state, however following the reapportionment that occurred due to the 2000 United States census, the old 2nd district was broken up with the largest portion being transferred to the redrawn 7th. The new 2nd was based in the southern metro area and comprised approximately 41% from the old 6th, 22% from the old 2nd, 22% from the old 1st, 14% from the old 3rd and 1% from the old 4th.

== Recent election results from statewide races ==
Year	Office	Results
1993–2003 Boundaries
1992	President	Clinton 37% - 35% - 28%
1996	President	Clinton 45% - 39% - 16%
2000	President	Bush 54% - 40%
2003–2013 Boundaries
2000	President	Bush 51% - 45%
2004	President	Bush 54% - 45%
2008	President	Obama 50% - 48%
2008	Senate	Coleman 46% - 37%
2010	Governor	Emmer 48% - 38%
2010	Secretary of State	Severson 50% - 45%
2010	Auditor	Anderson 51% - 45%
2010	Attorney General	Swanson 49% - 46%
2013–2023 Boundaries
2008	President	Obama 50.5% - 47.6%
2012	President	Obama 48.9% - 48.8%
2012	Senate	Klobuchar 62% - 34%
2014	Senate	Franken 49% - 48%
2014	Governor	Johnson 49% - 46%
2014	Secretary of State	Severson 50% - 43%
2014	Auditor	Otto 49% - 43%
2014	Attorney General	Swanson 50% - 42%
2016	President	Trump 46% - 45%
2018	Senate (Reg.)	Klobuchar 59% - 38%
2018	Senate (Spec.)	Smith 51% - 45%
2018	Governor	Walz 52% - 44%
2018	Secretary of State	Simon 50% - 46%
2018	Auditor	Blaha 47% - 45%
2018	Attorney General	Wardlow 48% - 46%
2020	President	Biden 52% - 45%
2020	Senate	Smith 48% - 44%
2023–2033 Boundaries
2020	President	Biden 52.4% - 45.5%
2022	Governor	Walz 53% - 45%
2022	Secretary of State	Simon 55% - 45%
2022	Auditor	Wilson 48% - 47%
2022	Attorney General	Schultz 50.2% - 49.7%
2024	President	Harris 52% - 46%
2024	Senate	Klobuchar 57% - 40%
2026	Senate	Flanagan 54% - 44%
2026	Governor	Klobuchar 56% - 42%
2026	Secretary of State	Simon 55% - 41%
2026	Auditor	Filipovich 53% - 44%
2026	Attorney General	Ellison 54% - 46%

== Current composition ==
=== By county ===
County	Pop.	Share
Dakota	439,882	61.67%
Scott	150,928	21.16%
Washington	57,572	8.07%
Rice	36,256	5.08%
Le Sueur	28,674	4.02%

=== By community ===
For the 118th and successive Congresses (based on redistricting following the 2020 census), the district contains all or portions of the following counties, townships, and municipalities:

Dakota County (34)

All 34 townships and municipalities

Le Sueur County (27)

All 27 townships and municipalities

Rice County (12)

Bridgewater Township, Dundas, Erin Township, Forest Township, Lonsdale, Morristown, Morristown Township, Northfield (shared with Dakota County), Northfield Township (part; also 1st), Shieldsville Township, Webster Township, Wheatland Township

Scott County (18)

All 18 township and municipalities

Washington County (6)

Cottage Grove, Denmark Township, Grey Cloud Island Township, Newport, St. Paul Park, Woodbury (part; also 4th)

== List of members representing the district ==
Member	Party	Years	Cong ress	Electoral history	District location
District created March 4, 1861
Ignatius L. Donnelly (Hastings)	Republican	March 4, 1863 – March 3, 1869	38th 39th 40th	Elected in 1862. Re-elected in 1864. Re-elected in 1866. Lost re-election.	1863–1873; All parts of the state not included in the 1st Congressional District
Eugene M. Wilson (Minneapolis)	Democratic	March 4, 1869 – March 3, 1871	41st	Elected in 1868. Lost re-election.	1863–1873; All parts of the state not included in the 1st Congressional District
John T. Averill (St. Paul)	Republican	March 4, 1871 – March 3, 1873	42nd	Elected in 1870. Redistricted to the 3rd district.	1863–1873; All parts of the state not included in the 1st Congressional District
Horace B. Strait (Shakopee)	Republican	March 4, 1873 – March 3, 1879	43rd 44th 45th	Elected in 1872. Re-elected in 1874. Re-elected in 1876. Lost re-election.	1873–1883; Brown, Carver, Chippewa, Dakota, Goodhue, Kandiyohi, Le Sueur, Lyon, McLeod, Nicollet, Redwood, Renville, Rice, Scott, Sibley, Swift, and Wabasha
Henry Poehler (Henderson)	Democratic	March 4, 1879 – March 3, 1881	46th	Elected in 1878. Lost re-election.	1873–1883; Brown, Carver, Chippewa, Dakota, Goodhue, Kandiyohi, Le Sueur, Lyon, McLeod, Nicollet, Redwood, Renville, Rice, Scott, Sibley, Swift, and Wabasha
Horace B. Strait (Shakopee)	Republican	March 4, 1881 – March 3, 1883	47th	Elected in 1880. Redistricted to the 3rd district.	1873–1883; Brown, Carver, Chippewa, Dakota, Goodhue, Kandiyohi, Le Sueur, Lyon, McLeod, Nicollet, Redwood, Renville, Rice, Scott, Sibley, Swift, and Wabasha
James Wakefield (Blue Earth City)	Republican	March 4, 1883 – March 3, 1887	48th 49th	Elected in 1882. Re-elected in 1884. Retired.	1883–1893; Blue Earth, Brown, Cottonwood, Faribault, Jackson, Lac qui Parle, Le Sueur, Lincoln, Lyon, Martin, Murray, Nicollet, Nobles, Pipestone, Redwood, Rock, Sibley, Waseca,Watonwan, and Yellow Medicine
John Lind (New Ulm)	Republican	March 4, 1887 – March 3, 1893	50th 51st 52nd	Elected in 1886. Re-elected in 1888. Re-elected in 1890. Retired.	1883–1893; Blue Earth, Brown, Cottonwood, Faribault, Jackson, Lac qui Parle, Le Sueur, Lincoln, Lyon, Martin, Murray, Nicollet, Nobles, Pipestone, Redwood, Rock, Sibley, Waseca,Watonwan, and Yellow Medicine
James McCleary (Mankato)	Republican	March 4, 1893 – March 3, 1907	53rd 54th 55th 56th 57th 58th 59th	Elected in 1892. Re-elected in 1894. Re-elected in 1896. Re-elected in 1898. Re-elected in 1900. Re-elected in 1902. Re-elected in 1904. Lost re-election.	1893–1903; Blue Earth, Brown, Chippewa, Cottonwood, Faribault, Jackson, Lac qui Parle, Lincoln, Lyon, Martin, Murray, Nicollet, Nobles, Pipestone, Redwood, Rock, Watonwan, and Yellow Medicine
James McCleary (Mankato)	Republican	March 4, 1893 – March 3, 1907	53rd 54th 55th 56th 57th 58th 59th	Elected in 1892. Re-elected in 1894. Re-elected in 1896. Re-elected in 1898. Re-elected in 1900. Re-elected in 1902. Re-elected in 1904. Lost re-election.	1903–1915; Blue Earth, Brown, Cottonwood, Faribault, Jackson, Martin, Murray, Nobles, Pipestone, Rock, and Watonwan
Winfield Scott Hammond (St. James)	Democratic	March 4, 1907 – January 6, 1915	60th 61st 62nd 63rd	Elected in 1906. Re-elected in 1908. Re-elected in 1910. Re-elected in 1912. Resigned when elected Governor of Minnesota.	1903–1915; Blue Earth, Brown, Cottonwood, Faribault, Jackson, Martin, Murray, Nobles, Pipestone, Rock, and Watonwan
Vacant		January 6, 1915 – March 3, 1915	63rd		1903–1915; Blue Earth, Brown, Cottonwood, Faribault, Jackson, Martin, Murray, Nobles, Pipestone, Rock, and Watonwan
Franklin Ellsworth (Mankato)	Republican	March 4, 1915 – March 3, 1921	64th 65th 66th	Elected in 1914. Re-elected in 1916. Re-elected in 1918. Retired to run for Governor of Minnesota.	1915–1933; Blue Earth, Brown, Cottonwood, Faribault, Jackson, Lincoln, Martin, Murray, Nobles, Pipestone, Redwood, Rock, and Watonwan
Frank Clague (Redwood Falls)	Republican	March 4, 1921 – March 3, 1933	67th 68th 69th 70th 71st 72nd	Elected in 1920. Re-elected in 1922. Re-elected in 1924. Re-elected in 1926. Re-elected in 1928. Re-elected in 1930. Retired.	1915–1933; Blue Earth, Brown, Cottonwood, Faribault, Jackson, Lincoln, Martin, Murray, Nobles, Pipestone, Redwood, Rock, and Watonwan
District inactive		March 4, 1933 – January 3, 1935	73rd	All representatives elected at-large	
Elmer Ryan (South St. Paul)	Democratic	January 3, 1935 – January 3, 1941	74th 75th 76th	Elected in 1934. Re-elected in 1936. Re-elected in 1938. Lost Re-election.	1935–1963; Blue Earth, Brown, Carver, Cottonwood, Dakota, Faribault, Jackson, Le Sueur, Martin, McLeod, Nicollet, Scott, Sibley, and Watonwan
Joseph P. O'Hara (Glencoe)	Republican	January 3, 1941 – January 3, 1959	77th 78th 79th 80th 81st 82nd 83rd 84th 85th	Elected in 1940. Re-elected in 1942. Re-elected in 1944. Re-elected in 1946. Re-elected in 1948. Re-elected in 1950. Re-elected in 1952. Re-elected in 1954. Re-elected in 1956. Retired.	1935–1963; Blue Earth, Brown, Carver, Cottonwood, Dakota, Faribault, Jackson, Le Sueur, Martin, McLeod, Nicollet, Scott, Sibley, and Watonwan
Ancher Nelsen (Hutchinson)	Republican	January 3, 1959 – December 31, 1974	86th 87th 88th 89th 90th 91st 92nd 93rd	Elected in 1958. Re-elected in 1960. Re-elected in 1962. Re-elected in 1964. Re-elected in 1966. Re-elected in 1968. Re-elected in 1970. Re-elected in 1972. Retired and resigned early.	1935–1963; Blue Earth, Brown, Carver, Cottonwood, Dakota, Faribault, Jackson, Le Sueur, Martin, McLeod, Nicollet, Scott, Sibley, and Watonwan
Ancher Nelsen (Hutchinson)	Republican	January 3, 1959 – December 31, 1974	86th 87th 88th 89th 90th 91st 92nd 93rd	Elected in 1958. Re-elected in 1960. Re-elected in 1962. Re-elected in 1964. Re-elected in 1966. Re-elected in 1968. Re-elected in 1970. Re-elected in 1972. Retired and resigned early.	1963–1973; Blue Earth, Brown, Carver, Cottonwood, Faribault, Jackson, Le Sueur, Martin, McLeod, Murray, Nobles, Pipestone, Rock, Scott, Sibley, Waseca, and Watonwan
Ancher Nelsen (Hutchinson)	Republican	January 3, 1959 – December 31, 1974	86th 87th 88th 89th 90th 91st 92nd 93rd	Elected in 1958. Re-elected in 1960. Re-elected in 1962. Re-elected in 1964. Re-elected in 1966. Re-elected in 1968. Re-elected in 1970. Re-elected in 1972. Retired and resigned early.	1973–1983; Blue Earth, Brown, Carver, Faribault, Freeborn, Le Sueur, Martin, McLeod, Mower, Nicollet, Scott, Sibley, Waseca, and Watonwan; parts of Dakota and Hennepin
Vacant		December 31, 1974 – January 3, 1975	93rd		1973–1983; Blue Earth, Brown, Carver, Faribault, Freeborn, Le Sueur, Martin, McLeod, Mower, Nicollet, Scott, Sibley, Waseca, and Watonwan; parts of Dakota and Hennepin
Tom Hagedorn (Truman)	Republican	January 3, 1975 – January 3, 1983	94th 95th 96th 97th	Elected in 1974. Re-elected in 1976. Re-elected in 1978. Re-elected in 1980. Redistricted to the 1st district and lost re-election.	1973–1983; Blue Earth, Brown, Carver, Faribault, Freeborn, Le Sueur, Martin, McLeod, Mower, Nicollet, Scott, Sibley, Waseca, and Watonwan; parts of Dakota and Hennepin
Vin Weber (North Mankato)	Republican	January 3, 1983 – January 3, 1993	98th 99th 100th 101st 102nd	Redistricted from the 6th district and re-elected in 1982. Re-elected in 1984. Re-elected in 1986. Re-elected in 1988. Re-elected in 1990. Retired.	1983–1993; Big Stone, Brown, Chippewa, Cottonwood, Douglas, Faribault, Jackson, Kandiyohi, Lac qui Parle, Lincoln, Lyon, Martin, McLeod, Meeker, Murray, Nicollet, Nobles, Pipestone, Pope, Redwood, Renville, Rock, Sibley, Stevens, Swift, Traverse, Watonwan, and Yellow Medicine; parts of Grant, Le Sueur, and Wright
David Minge (Montevideo)	Democratic (DFL)	January 3, 1993 – January 3, 2001	103rd 104th 105th 106th	Elected in 1992. Re-elected in 1994. Re-elected in 1996. Re-elected in 1998. Lost re-election.	1993–1995; Big Stone, Brown, Carver, Chippewa, Cottonwood, Jackson, Kandiyohi, Lac qui Parle, Lincoln, Lyon, Martin, McLeod, Meeker, Murray, Nicollet, Nobles, Pipestone, Redwood, Renville, Rock, Sibley, Swift, Watonwan, Wright, and Yellow Medicine; parts of Hennepin and Scott
David Minge (Montevideo)	Democratic (DFL)	January 3, 1993 – January 3, 2001	103rd 104th 105th 106th	Elected in 1992. Re-elected in 1994. Re-elected in 1996. Re-elected in 1998. Lost re-election.	1995–2003; Big Stone, Brown, Carver, Chippewa, Cottonwood, Jackson, Kandiyohi, Lac qui Parle, Lincoln, Lyon, Martin, McLeod, Meeker, Murray, Nobles, Pipestone, Redwood, Renville, Rock, Sibley, Swift, Watonwan, Wright, and Yellow Medicine; parts of Le Sueur, Nicollet, Scott, and Stearns
Mark Kennedy (Watertown)	Republican	January 3, 2001 – January 3, 2003	107th	Elected in 2000. Redistricted to the 6th district.	1995–2003; Big Stone, Brown, Carver, Chippewa, Cottonwood, Jackson, Kandiyohi, Lac qui Parle, Lincoln, Lyon, Martin, McLeod, Meeker, Murray, Nobles, Pipestone, Redwood, Renville, Rock, Sibley, Swift, Watonwan, Wright, and Yellow Medicine; parts of Le Sueur, Nicollet, Scott, and Stearns
John Kline (Burnsville)	Republican	January 3, 2003 – January 3, 2017	108th 109th 110th 111th 112th 113th 114th	Elected in 2002. Re-elected in 2004. Re-elected in 2006. Re-elected in 2008. Re-elected in 2010. Re-elected in 2012. Re-elected in 2014. Retired.	2003–2013 Carver, Goodhue, Le Sueur, Rice, and Scott; parts of Dakota and Washington
John Kline (Burnsville)	Republican	January 3, 2003 – January 3, 2017	108th 109th 110th 111th 112th 113th 114th	Elected in 2002. Re-elected in 2004. Re-elected in 2006. Re-elected in 2008. Re-elected in 2010. Re-elected in 2012. Re-elected in 2014. Retired.	2013–2023 Dakota, Goodhue, Scott, and Wabasha; parts of Rice and Washington
Jason Lewis (Cottage Grove)	Republican	January 3, 2017 – January 3, 2019	115th	Elected in 2016. Lost re-election.	2013–2023 Dakota, Goodhue, Scott, and Wabasha; parts of Rice and Washington
Angie Craig (Prior Lake)	Democratic (DFL)	January 3, 2019 – present	116th 117th 118th 119th	Elected in 2018. Re-elected in 2020. Re-elected in 2022. Re-elected in 2024. Retired to run for U.S Senate.	2013–2023 Dakota, Goodhue, Scott, and Wabasha; parts of Rice and Washington
Angie Craig (Prior Lake)	Democratic (DFL)	January 3, 2019 – present	116th 117th 118th 119th	Elected in 2018. Re-elected in 2020. Re-elected in 2022. Re-elected in 2024. Retired to run for U.S Senate.	2023–present Dakota, Le Sueur, and Scott; parts of Rice and Washington
Matt Little (Lakeville)	Democratic (DFL)	Taking office on January 3, 2027		Elected in 2026.	2023–present Dakota, Le Sueur, and Scott; parts of Rice and Washington

== Recent election results ==
Graph of election results in Minnesota's 2nd congressional district (minor parties omitted)

=== 2002–2012 ===
==== 2002 ====
2002 Second Congressional District of Minnesota election
Party	Candidate	Votes	%
Republican	John Kline	152,533	53.3
Democratic (DFL)	Bill Luther (incumbent)	121,072	42.3
No New Taxes	Sam Garst	12,408	4.3
Write-in		339	0.1
Total votes		286,352	100.0
Republican win (new boundaries)			

==== 2004 ====
2004 Second Congressional District of Minnesota election
Party	Candidate	Votes	%	±%
Republican	John Kline (incumbent)	206,313	56.4	+3.1
Democratic (DFL)	Teresa Daly	147,527	40.3	−2.0
Independence	Doug Williams	11,822	3.2	N/a
Write-in		283	0.1	–0.0
Total votes		365,945	100.0	
Republican hold		Swing	+2.5	

==== 2006 ====
2006 Second Congressional District of Minnesota election
Party	Candidate	Votes	%	±%
Republican	John Kline (incumbent)	163,292	56.2	−0.2
Democratic (DFL)	Coleen Rowley	116,360	40.0	–0.3
Independence	Doug Williams	10,802	3.7	+0.5
Write-in		126	0.0	–0.0
Total votes		290,580	100.0	
Republican hold		Swing	+0.0	

==== 2008 ====
2008 Second Congressional District of Minnesota election
Party	Candidate	Votes	%	±%
Republican	John Kline (incumbent)	220,926	57.3	+1.1
Democratic (DFL)	Steve Sarvi	164,079	42.5	+2.5
Write-in		639	0.2	+0.1
Total votes		385,656	100.0	
Republican hold		Swing	–0.7	

==== 2010 ====
2010 Second Congressional District of Minnesota Election
Party	Candidate	Votes	%	±%
Republican	John Kline (incumbent)	181.341	63.3	+6.0
Democratic (DFL)	Shelley Madore	104,809	36.6	–6.0
Write-in		303	0.1	–0.1
Total votes		286,453	100.0	
Republican hold		Swing	+6.0	

=== 2012–2022 ===
==== 2012 ====
2012 Second Congressional District of Minnesota Election
Party	Candidate	Votes	%
Republican	John Kline (incumbent)	193,587	54.0
Democratic (DFL)	Mike Obermueller	164,338	45.9
Write-in		521	0.1
Total votes		358,446	100.0
Republican win (new boundaries)			

==== 2014 ====
2014 Second Congressional District of Minnesota election
Party	Candidate	Votes	%	±%
Republican	John Kline (incumbent)	137,778	56.0	+2.0
Democratic (DFL)	Mike Obermueller	95,565	38.9	–7.0
Independence	Paula Overby	12,319	5.0	N/a
Write-in		186	0.1	–0.1
Total votes		245,848	100.0	
Republican hold		Swing	+4.5	

==== 2016 ====
2016 Second Congressional District of Minnesota Election
Party	Candidate	Votes	%	±%
Republican	Jason Lewis	173,970	47.0	–9.1
Democratic (DFL)	Angie Craig	167,315	45.2	+6.3
Independence	Paula Overby	28,869	7.8	+2.8
Write-in		360	0.1	+0.0
Total votes		370,514	100.0	
Republican hold		Swing	–7.7	

==== 2018 ====
Minnesota's 2nd congressional district election 2018
Party	Candidate	Votes	%	±%
Democratic (DFL)	Angie Craig	177,954	52.7	+7.5
Republican	Jason Lewis (Incumbent)	159,343	47.1	+0.2
Write-in		668	0.2	+0.1
Total votes		337,965	100.0	
Democratic (DFL) gain from Republican		Swing	+3.7	

==== 2020 ====
Minnesota's 2nd congressional district, 2020
Party	Candidate	Votes	%	±%
Democratic (DFL)	Angie Craig (incumbent)	204,534	48.2	–4.5
Republican	Tyler Kistner	194,954	45.9	–1.2
Legal Marijuana Now	Adam Charles Weeks †	24,751	5.8	N/a
Write-in		273	0.1	–0.1
Total votes		424,512	100.0	
Democratic (DFL) hold		Swing	–1.6	

=== 2022–present ===
==== 2022 ====
2022 Minnesota's 2nd congressional district election
Party	Candidate	Votes	%
Democratic (DFL)	Angie Craig (incumbent)	165,583	50.9
Republican	Tyler Kistner	148,576	45.6
Legal Marijuana Now	Paula Overby †	10,728	3.3
Write-in		585	0.2
Total votes		325,472	100.0
Democratic (DFL) win (new boundaries)			

==== 2024 ====
2024 Minnesota's 2nd congressional district election
Party	Candidate	Votes	%	±%
Democratic (DFL)	Angie Craig (incumbent)	231,751	55.5	+4.7
Republican	Joe Teirab	175,621	42.1	–3.6
Constitutional conservative	Tom Bowman (withdrawn)	9,492	2.3	N/a
Write-in		455	0.1	–0.1
Total votes		417,319	100.0	
Democratic (DFL) hold		Swing	+4.1	
