= Minnesota's 3rd congressional district =

U.S. House district for Minnesota

Coordinates: 44°59′45″N 93°31′43″W

- Interactive map of district boundaries since January 3, 2023, with Hennepin County highlighted in red
- Representative: Kelly Morrison; DFL–Wayzata
- Area: 468 mi^{2} (1,210 km^{2})
- Distribution: 95.57% urban; 4.43% rural
- Population (2025): 721,265
- Median household income: $111,323
- Ethnicity: 71.4% White; 9.5% Black; 8.7% Asian; 5.2% Hispanic; 4.4% Two or more races; 0.8% other
- Cook PVI: D+11

Minnesota's 3rd congressional district contains suburbs in Hennepin and Anoka counties to the west, south, and north of Minneapolis. The district, which is mostly suburban in character, includes a few farming communities on its far western edge and also inner-ring suburban areas on its eastern edge. The district includes the blue collar cities of Brooklyn Park and Coon Rapids to the north-east, middle-income Bloomington to the south, and higher-income Eden Prairie, Edina, Hopkins, Maple Grove, Plymouth, Minnetonka, and Wayzata to the west. Democrat Kelly Morrison currently represents the district in the U.S. House of Representatives, after being elected in 2024.

The 3rd congressional district has the highest median household income out of Minnesota's congressional districts, with a median household income of $100,867, compared to the state average of $74,593. In 2020, 12 percent of residents of the 3rd congressional district were immigrants; the largest countries of origin were India, Mexico, Laos, Liberia, and Vietnam. The largest immigrant populations in the district are concentrated in Brooklyn Park, one of the most ethnically diverse cities in Minnesota, as well as in Eden Prairie and Bloomington.

The 2024 election was between Republican Tad Jude and Democrat Kelly Morrison. It was described as "decidedly low-keyed", notable for a lack of attack ads or advertising in general.

== Recent election results from statewide races ==
Year	Office	Results
2003–2013 Boundaries
2008	President	Obama 52% - 46%
2008	Senate	Coleman 47% - 38%
2010	Governor	Emmer 48% - 38%
2010	Secretary of State	Severson 51% - 46%
2010	Auditor	Anderson 51% - 45%
2010	Attorney General	Swanson 49% - 46%
2013–2023 Boundaries
2012	President	Obama 51% - 47%
2012	Senate	Klobuchar 64% - 33%
2014	Senate	Franken 50% - 47%
2014	Governor	Johnson 48% - 47%
2014	Secretary of State	Severson 50% - 45%
2014	Auditor	Otto 49% - 44%
2014	Attorney General	Swanson 51% - 42%
2016	President	Clinton 51% - 40%
2018	Senate (Reg.)	Klobuchar 63% - 34%
2018	Senate (Spec.)	Smith 55% - 41%
2018	Governor	Walz 55% - 41%
2018	Secretary of State	Simon 54% - 42%
2018	Auditor	Blaha 51% - 42%
2018	Attorney General	Ellison 51% - 44%
2020	President	Biden 59% - 38%
2020	Senate	Smith 54% - 39%
2023–2033 Boundaries
2022	Governor	Walz 59% - 38%
2022	Secretary of State	Simon 61% - 39%
2022	Auditor	Blaha 53% - 42%
2022	Attorney General	Ellison 56% - 44%
2024	President	Harris 59% - 38%
2024	Senate	Klobuchar 63% - 34%
2026	Senate	Flanagan 60% - 38%
2026	Governor	Klobuchar 63% - 36%
2026	Secretary of State	Simon 61% - 36%
2026	Auditor	Filipovich 59% - 38%
2026	Attorney General	Ellison 60% - 40%

== Composition ==
For the 118th and successive Congresses (based on redistricting following the 2020 census), the district contains all or portions of the following counties, townships, and municipalities:

Anoka County (3)

Anoka, Coon Rapids, Ramsey (part; also 6th)

Hennepin County (34)

Bloomington, Brooklyn Park, Champlin, Chanhassen (part; also 6th; shared with Carver County), Corcoran, Dayton, Deephaven, Eden Prairie, Edina (part; also 5th), Excelsior, Greenfield, Greenwood, Hopkins, Independence, Long Lake, Loretto, Maple Grove, Maple Plain, Medicine Lake, Medina, Minnetonka, Minnetonka Beach, Minnetrista, Mound, Orono, Osseo, Plymouth, Rogers, Shorewood, Spring Park, St. Bonifacius, Tonka Bay, Wayzata, Woodland

== List of members representing the district ==
Member	Party	Years	Cong ress	Electoral history	District location
District created March 4, 1873
John T. Averill (St. Paul)	Republican	March 4, 1873 – March 3, 1875	43rd	Redistricted from the 2nd district and re-elected in 1872. Retired.	1873–1883 [data missing]
William S. King (Minneapolis)	Republican	March 4, 1875 – March 3, 1877	44th	Elected in 1874. Retired.	1873–1883 [data missing]
Jacob H. Stewart (St. Paul)	Republican	March 4, 1877 – March 3, 1879	45th	Elected in 1876. Retired.	1873–1883 [data missing]
William D. Washburn (Minneapolis)	Republican	March 4, 1879 – March 3, 1883	46th 47th	Elected in 1878. Re-elected in 1880. Redistricted to the 4th district.	1873–1883 [data missing]
Horace B. Strait (Shakopee)	Republican	March 4, 1883 – March 3, 1887	48th 49th	Redistricted from the 2nd district and re-elected in 1882. Re-elected in 1884. Lost re-election.	1883–1893; Carver, Chippewa, Dakota, Goodhue, Kandiyohi, McLeod, Meeker, Renville, Rice, Scott, and Swift
John L. MacDonald (Shakopee)	Democratic	March 4, 1887 – March 3, 1889	50th	Elected in 1886. Lost re-election.	1883–1893; Carver, Chippewa, Dakota, Goodhue, Kandiyohi, McLeod, Meeker, Renville, Rice, Scott, and Swift
Darwin Hall (Stewart)	Republican	March 4, 1889 – March 3, 1891	51st	Elected in 1888. Lost re-election.	1883–1893; Carver, Chippewa, Dakota, Goodhue, Kandiyohi, McLeod, Meeker, Renville, Rice, Scott, and Swift
Osee M. Hall (Red Wing)	Democratic	March 4, 1891 – March 3, 1895	52nd 53rd	Elected in 1890. Re-elected in 1892. Lost re-election.	1883–1893; Carver, Chippewa, Dakota, Goodhue, Kandiyohi, McLeod, Meeker, Renville, Rice, Scott, and Swift
Osee M. Hall (Red Wing)	Democratic	March 4, 1891 – March 3, 1895	52nd 53rd	Elected in 1890. Re-elected in 1892. Lost re-election.	1893–1903; Carver, Dakota, Goodhue, Le Sueur, McLeod, Meeker, Renville, Rice, Scott, and Sibley
Joel Heatwole (Northfield)	Republican	March 4, 1895 – March 3, 1903	54th 55th 56th 57th	Elected in 1894. Re-elected in 1896. Re-elected in 1898. Re-elected in 1900. Retired.	1893–1903; Carver, Dakota, Goodhue, Le Sueur, McLeod, Meeker, Renville, Rice, Scott, and Sibley
Charles Russell Davis (St. Paul)	Republican	March 4, 1903 – March 3, 1925	58th 59th 60th 61st 62nd 63rd 64th 65th 66th 67th 68th	Elected in 1902. Re-elected in 1904. Re-elected in 1906. Re-elected in 1908. Re-elected in 1910. Re-elected in 1912. Re-elected in 1914. Re-elected in 1916. Re-elected in 1918. Re-elected in 1920. Re-elected in 1922. Lost renomination.	1903–1915 [data missing]
Charles Russell Davis (St. Paul)	Republican	March 4, 1903 – March 3, 1925	58th 59th 60th 61st 62nd 63rd 64th 65th 66th 67th 68th	Elected in 1902. Re-elected in 1904. Re-elected in 1906. Re-elected in 1908. Re-elected in 1910. Re-elected in 1912. Re-elected in 1914. Re-elected in 1916. Re-elected in 1918. Re-elected in 1920. Re-elected in 1922. Lost renomination.	1915–1933; Carver, Dakota, Goodhue, Le Sueur, McLeod, Nicollet, Rice, Scott, Sibley, and Washington
August H. Andresen (Red Wing)	Republican	March 4, 1925 – March 3, 1933	69th 70th 71st 72nd	Elected in 1924. Re-elected in 1926. Re-elected in 1928. Re-elected in 1930. Redistricted to the at-large district and lost re-election.	1915–1933; Carver, Dakota, Goodhue, Le Sueur, McLeod, Nicollet, Rice, Scott, Sibley, and Washington
District inactive		March 4, 1933 – January 3, 1935	73rd	All representatives elected at-large	
Ernest Lundeen (Minneapolis)	Farmer–Labor	January 3, 1935 – January 3, 1937	74th	Redistricted from the at-large district and re-elected in 1934. Retired to run for U.S. senator.	1935–1963; Anoka, Chisago, Isanti, and Washington; parts of Hennepin
Henry Teigan (Minneapolis)	Farmer–Labor	January 3, 1937 – January 3, 1939	75th	Elected in 1936. Lost re-election.	1935–1963; Anoka, Chisago, Isanti, and Washington; parts of Hennepin
John G. Alexander (Minneapolis)	Republican	January 3, 1939 – January 3, 1941	76th	Elected in 1938. Lost renomination.	1935–1963; Anoka, Chisago, Isanti, and Washington; parts of Hennepin
Richard P. Gale (Mound)	Republican	January 3, 1941 – January 3, 1945	77th 78th	Elected in 1940. Re-elected in 1942. Lost re-election.	1935–1963; Anoka, Chisago, Isanti, and Washington; parts of Hennepin
William Gallagher (Minneapolis)	Democratic (DFL)	January 3, 1945 – August 13, 1946	79th	Elected in 1944. Died.	1935–1963; Anoka, Chisago, Isanti, and Washington; parts of Hennepin
Vacant		August 13, 1946 – January 3, 1947	79th		1935–1963; Anoka, Chisago, Isanti, and Washington; parts of Hennepin
George MacKinnon (Minneapolis)	Republican	January 3, 1947 – January 3, 1949	80th	Elected in 1946. Lost re-election.	1935–1963; Anoka, Chisago, Isanti, and Washington; parts of Hennepin
Roy Wier (Minneapolis)	Democratic (DFL)	January 3, 1949 – January 3, 1961	81st 82nd 83rd 84th 85th 86th	Elected in 1948. Re-elected in 1950. Re-elected in 1952. Re-elected in 1954. Re-elected in 1956. Re-elected in 1958. Lost re-election.	1935–1963; Anoka, Chisago, Isanti, and Washington; parts of Hennepin
Clark MacGregor (Plymouth)	Republican	January 3, 1961 – January 3, 1971	87th 88th 89th 90th 91st	Elected in 1960. Re-elected in 1962. Re-elected in 1964. Re-elected in 1966. Re-elected in 1968. Retired to run for U.S. senator.	1935–1963; Anoka, Chisago, Isanti, and Washington; parts of Hennepin
Clark MacGregor (Plymouth)	Republican	January 3, 1961 – January 3, 1971	87th 88th 89th 90th 91st	Elected in 1960. Re-elected in 1962. Re-elected in 1964. Re-elected in 1966. Re-elected in 1968. Retired to run for U.S. senator.	1963–1973; Anoka; parts of Hennepin
Bill Frenzel (Golden Valley)	Republican	January 3, 1971 – January 3, 1991	92nd 93rd 94th 95th 96th 97th 98th 99th 100th 101st	Elected in 1970. Re-elected in 1972. Re-elected in 1974. Re-elected in 1976. Re-elected in 1978. Re-elected in 1980. Re-elected in 1982. Re-elected in 1984. Re-elected in 1986. Re-elected in 1988. Retired.	1963–1973; Anoka; parts of Hennepin
Bill Frenzel (Golden Valley)	Republican	January 3, 1971 – January 3, 1991	92nd 93rd 94th 95th 96th 97th 98th 99th 100th 101st	Elected in 1970. Re-elected in 1972. Re-elected in 1974. Re-elected in 1976. Re-elected in 1978. Re-elected in 1980. Re-elected in 1982. Re-elected in 1984. Re-elected in 1986. Re-elected in 1988. Retired.	1973–1983 [data missing]
Bill Frenzel (Golden Valley)	Republican	January 3, 1971 – January 3, 1991	92nd 93rd 94th 95th 96th 97th 98th 99th 100th 101st	Elected in 1970. Re-elected in 1972. Re-elected in 1974. Re-elected in 1976. Re-elected in 1978. Re-elected in 1980. Re-elected in 1982. Re-elected in 1984. Re-elected in 1986. Re-elected in 1988. Retired.	1983–1993; Parts of Carver, Dakota, Goodhue, Hennepin, and Scott
Jim Ramstad (Minnetonka)	Republican	January 3, 1991 – January 3, 2009	102nd 103rd 104th 105th 106th 107th 108th 109th 110th	Elected in 1990. Re-elected in 1992. Re-elected in 1994. Re-elected in 1996. Re-elected in 1998. Re-elected in 2000. Re-elected in 2002. Re-elected in 2004. Re-elected in 2006. Retired.	1983–1993; Parts of Carver, Dakota, Goodhue, Hennepin, and Scott
Jim Ramstad (Minnetonka)	Republican	January 3, 1991 – January 3, 2009	102nd 103rd 104th 105th 106th 107th 108th 109th 110th	Elected in 1990. Re-elected in 1992. Re-elected in 1994. Re-elected in 1996. Re-elected in 1998. Re-elected in 2000. Re-elected in 2002. Re-elected in 2004. Re-elected in 2006. Retired.	1993–1995; Parts of Dakota, Hennepin, Scott, and Washington
Jim Ramstad (Minnetonka)	Republican	January 3, 1991 – January 3, 2009	102nd 103rd 104th 105th 106th 107th 108th 109th 110th	Elected in 1990. Re-elected in 1992. Re-elected in 1994. Re-elected in 1996. Re-elected in 1998. Re-elected in 2000. Re-elected in 2002. Re-elected in 2004. Re-elected in 2006. Retired.	1995–2003; Parts of Dakota, Hennepin, Scott, and Wright
Jim Ramstad (Minnetonka)	Republican	January 3, 1991 – January 3, 2009	102nd 103rd 104th 105th 106th 107th 108th 109th 110th	Elected in 1990. Re-elected in 1992. Re-elected in 1994. Re-elected in 1996. Re-elected in 1998. Re-elected in 2000. Re-elected in 2002. Re-elected in 2004. Re-elected in 2006. Retired.	2003–2013 Parts of Anoka and Hennepin
Erik Paulsen (Eden Prairie)	Republican	January 3, 2009 – January 3, 2019	111th 112th 113th 114th 115th	Elected in 2008. Re-elected in 2010. Re-elected in 2012. Re-elected in 2014. Re-elected in 2016. Lost re-election.	2003–2013 Parts of Anoka and Hennepin
Erik Paulsen (Eden Prairie)	Republican	January 3, 2009 – January 3, 2019	111th 112th 113th 114th 115th	Elected in 2008. Re-elected in 2010. Re-elected in 2012. Re-elected in 2014. Re-elected in 2016. Lost re-election.	2013–2023 Parts of Anoka, Carver, and Hennepin
Dean Phillips (Plymouth)	Democratic (DFL)	January 3, 2019 – January 3, 2025	116th 117th 118th	Elected in 2018. Re-elected in 2020. Re-elected in 2022. Retired to run for U.S. President.	2013–2023 Parts of Anoka, Carver, and Hennepin
Dean Phillips (Plymouth)	Democratic (DFL)	January 3, 2019 – January 3, 2025	116th 117th 118th	Elected in 2018. Re-elected in 2020. Re-elected in 2022. Retired to run for U.S. President.	2023–present Parts of Anoka and Hennepin
Kelly Morrison (Wayzata)	Democratic (DFL)	January 3, 2025 – present	119th	Elected in 2024. Re-elected in 2026	2023–present Parts of Anoka and Hennepin

== Recent election results ==
Graph of election results in Minnesota's 3rd congressional district View source data.

=== 2022–present ===
==== 2024 ====
2024 Minnesota's 3rd congressional district election
Party	Candidate	Votes	%	±%
Democratic (DFL)	Kelly Morrison	240,209	58.4	
Republican	Tad Jude	170,427	41.5	
Write-in		504	0.1	
Total votes		411,140	100.0	
Democratic (DFL) hold		Swing		

==== 2022 ====
3rd Congressional District of Minnesota Election, 2022
Party	Candidate	Votes	%
Democratic (DFL)	Dean Phillips (Incumbent)	198,883	59.6
Republican	Tom Weiler	134,797	40.4
Write-in			
Total votes			100.0
Democratic (DFL) win (new boundaries)			

=== 2012–2022 ===
==== 2020 ====
3rd Congressional District of Minnesota Election, 2020
Party	Candidate	Votes	%	±%
Democratic (DFL)	Dean Phillips (Incumbent)	246,666	55.6	
Republican	Kendall Qualls	196,625	44.3	
Write-in				
Total votes			100.0	
Democratic (DFL) hold		Swing		

==== 2018 ====
3rd Congressional District of Minnesota Election, 2018
Party	Candidate	Votes	%	±%
Democratic (DFL)	Dean Phillips	202,402	55.6	
Republican	Erik Paulsen (Incumbent)	160,838	44.2	
Write-in				
Total votes			100.0	
Democratic (DFL) gain from Republican		Swing		

==== 2016 ====
3rd Congressional District of Minnesota Election, 2016
Party	Candidate	Votes	%	±%
Republican	Erik Paulsen (Incumbent)	233,075	56.9	
Democratic (DFL)	Terri Bonoff	169,238	43.1	
Write-in				
Total votes			100.0	
Republican hold		Swing		

==== 2014 ====
3rd Congressional District of Minnesota Election, 2014
Party	Candidate	Votes	%	±%
Republican	Erik Paulsen (Incumbent)	167,515	62.1	
Democratic (DFL)	Sharon Sund	101,846	37.8	
Write-in				
Total votes			100.0	
Republican hold		Swing		

==== 2012 ====
3rd Congressional District of Minnesota Election, 2012
Party	Candidate	Votes	%
Republican	Erik Paulsen (Incumbent)	222,335	58.1
Democratic (DFL)	Brian Barnes	159,937	41.8
Write-in		433	0.1
Total votes		382,705	100.0
Republican win (new boundaries)			

=== 2002–2012 ===
==== 2010 ====
3rd Congressional District of Minnesota Election, 2010
Party	Candidate	Votes	%	±%
Republican	Erik Paulsen (Incumbent)	161,177	58.8	
Democratic (DFL)	Jim Meffert	100,240	36.6	
Independence	Jon Oleson	12,508	4.6	
Write-in		167	0.1	
Total votes		274,092	100.0	
Republican hold		Swing		

==== 2008 ====
3rd Congressional District of Minnesota Election, 2008
Party	Candidate	Votes	%	±%
Republican	Erik Paulsen	179,032	48.5	
Democratic (DFL)	Ashwin Madia	150,863	40.9	
Independence	David Dillon	38,987	10.6	
Write-in		415	0.1	
Total votes		369,104	100.0	
Republican hold		Swing		

==== 2006 ====
3rd Congressional District of Minnesota Election, 2006
Party	Candidate	Votes	%	±%
Republican	Jim Ramstad (Incumbent)	184,355	64.9	
Democratic (DFL)	Wendy Wilde	99,599	35.0	
Write-in		323	0.1	
Total votes		284,244	100.0	
Republican hold		Swing		

==== 2004 ====
3rd Congressional District of Minnesota Election, 2004
Party	Candidate	Votes	%	±%
Republican	Jim Ramstad (Incumbent)	231,871	64.7	
Democratic (DFL)	Deborah Watts	126,665	35.3	
Write-in		356	0.1	
Total votes			100.0	
Republican hold		Swing		

==== 2002 ====
3rd Congressional District of Minnesota Election, 2002
Party	Candidate	Votes	%
Republican	Jim Ramstad (Incumbent)	213,334	72.0
Democratic (DFL)	Darryl Stanton	82,575	27.9
Write-in		309	0.1
Total votes		296,218	100.0
Republican win (new boundaries)			

=== 2000 ===
3rd Congressional District of Minnesota Election, 2000
Party	Candidate	Votes	%
Republican	Jim Ramstad (Incumbent)	222,571	67.6
Democratic (DFL)	Sue Schuff	98,219	29.9
Libertarian	Bob Odden	5,302	1.6
Constitution	Arne Niska	2,970	0.9
Total votes		329,062	100.0
Republican hold			

== Historical district boundaries ==
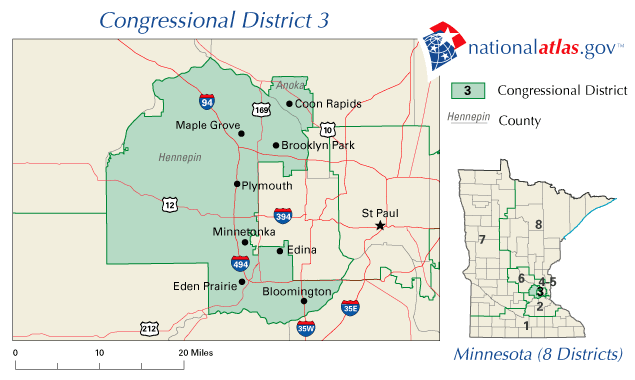
2003–2013

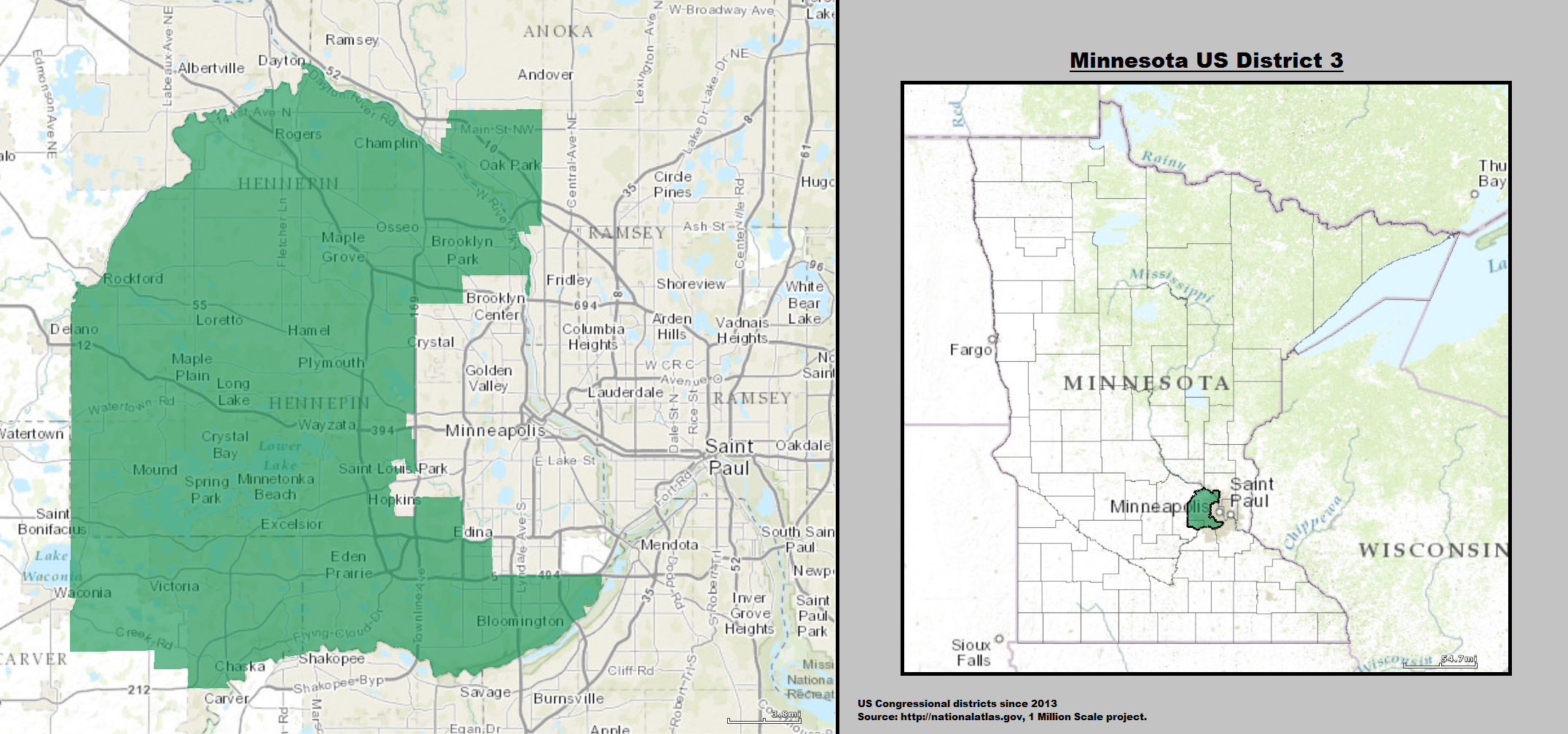
2013–2023

== See also ==
- Minnesota's congressional districts
- List of United States congressional districts
