= Minnesota's 6th congressional district =

U.S. House district for Minnesota

Coordinates: 45°20′13″N 93°51′07″W

- Interactive map of district boundaries since January 3, 2023
- Representative: Tom Emmer; R–Delano
- Area: 3,081 mi^{2} (7,980 km^{2})
- Distribution: 69.55% urban; 30.45% rural
- Population (2025): 759,486
- Median household income: $109,215
- Ethnicity: 84.1% White; 4.6% Black; 4.0% Two or more races; 3.7% Hispanic; 3.0% Asian; 0.7% other
- Cook PVI: R+10

Minnesota's 6th congressional district includes most or all of Benton, Carver, Sherburne, Stearns, Wright, and Anoka Counties. Many of the Twin Cities' outer northern and western suburbs are in this district, such as Blaine (the district's largest city), Andover, Chaska, Ramsey, St. Michael-Albertville, Elk River, Chanhassen, Otsego, Lino Lakes, Buffalo, Ham Lake, Monticello, Waconia, Big Lake, East Bethel, and Victoria. The St. Cloud area is the district's other major population center, including the cities of St. Cloud (the district's second-largest city), Sartell, Sauk Rapids, and Waite Park.

The district has been represented by Republican House majority whip Tom Emmer since 2015.

== Recent election results from statewide races ==
Year	Office	Results
2003–2013 Boundaries
2008	President	McCain 55% - 43%
2008	Senate	Coleman 50% - 32%
2010	Governor	Emmer 55% - 33%
2010	Secretary of State	Severson 57% - 38%
2010	Auditor	Anderson 57% - 39%
2010	Attorney General	Barden 51% - 43%
2013–2023 Boundaries
2012	President	Romney 56% - 41%
2012	Senate	Klobuchar 58% - 38%
2014	Senate	McFadden 54% - 42%
2014	Governor	Johnson 56% - 39%
2014	Secretary of State	Severson 58% - 35%
2014	Auditor	Gilbert 50% - 42%
2014	Attorney General	Newman 49% - 44%
2016	President	Trump 57% - 34%
2018	Senate (Reg.)	Klobuchar 49% - 48%
2018	Senate (Spec.)	Housley 55% - 41%
2018	Governor	Johnson 55% - 41%
2018	Secretary of State	Howe 56% - 39%
2018	Auditor	Myhra 55% - 37%
2018	Attorney General	Wardlow 57% - 36%
2020	President	Trump 58% - 40%
2020	Senate	Lewis 55% - 37%
2023–2033 Boundaries
2022	Governor	Jensen 57% - 40%
2022	Secretary of State	Crockett 57% - 42%
2022	Auditor	Wilson 59% - 35%
2022	Attorney General	Schultz 62% - 38%
2024	President	Trump 59% - 39%
2024	Senate	White 52% - 45%
2026	Senate	Tafoya 56% - 41%
2026	Governor	Demuth 55% - 43%
2026	Secretary of State	Jude 54% - 42%
2026	Auditor	Jensen 57% - 40%
2026	Attorney General	Schutz 58% - 41%

== Composition ==
For the 118th and successive Congresses (based on redistricting following the 2020 census), the district contains all or portions of the following counties, townships, and municipalities:

Anoka County (15)

Andover, Blaine, Bethel, Centerville, Circle Pines, Columbus, East Bethel, Ham Lake, Lexington, Lino Lakes, Linwood Township, Nowthen, Oak Grove, Ramsey (part; also 3rd), St. Francis (part; also 8th; shared with Isanti County)

Benton County (19)

All 19 townships and municipalities

Carver County (21)

All 21 townships and municipalities

Hennepin County (2)

Hanover (shared with Wright County), Rockford (shared with Wright County)

Sherburne County (17)

All 17 townships and municipalities

Stearns County (12)

Collegeville Township, Fair Haven Township, Le Sauk Township, Lynden Township, Rockville, Sartell, St. Augusta, St. Cloud, St. Joseph, St. Joseph Township, St. Wendell Township (part; also 7th), Waite Park

Wright County (35)

All 35 township and municipalities

== List of members representing the district ==
Member	Party	Years	Cong ress	Electoral history	District location
District created March 4, 1893
Melvin Baldwin (Duluth)	Democratic	March 4, 1893 – March 3, 1895	53rd	Elected in 1892. Lost re-election.	
Charles A. Towne (Duluth)	Republican	March 4, 1895 – March 3, 1897	54th	Elected in 1894. Lost re-election as an independent.	
Page Morris (Duluth)	Republican	March 4, 1897 – March 3, 1903	55th 56th 57th	Elected in 1896. Re-elected in 1898. Re-elected in 1900. Retired.	
Clarence Buckman (Little Falls)	Republican	March 4, 1903 – March 3, 1907	58th 59th	Elected in 1902. Re-elected in 1904. Lost renomination.	
Charles August Lindbergh (Little Falls)	Republican	March 4, 1907 – March 3, 1917	60th 61st 62nd 63rd 64th	Elected in 1906. Re-elected in 1908. Re-elected in 1910. Re-elected in 1912. Re-elected in 1914. Retired to run for U.S. senator.	
Harold Knutson (St. Cloud)	Republican	March 4, 1917 – March 3, 1933	65th 66th 67th 68th 69th 70th 71st 72nd	Elected in 1916. Re-elected in 1918. Re-elected in 1920. Re-elected in 1922. Re-elected in 1924. Re-elected in 1926. Re-elected in 1928. Re-elected in 1930. Redistricted to the at-large district.	
District inactive		March 4, 1933 – January 3, 1935	73rd	All members elected at-large.	
Harold Knutson (Manhattan Beach)	Republican	January 3, 1935 – January 3, 1949	74th 75th 76th 77th 78th 79th 80th	Redistricted from the at-large district and Re-elected in 1934. Re-elected in 1936. Re-elected in 1938. Re-elected in 1940. Re-elected in 1942. Re-elected in 1944. Re-elected in 1946. Lost re-election.	1935–1943
Harold Knutson (Manhattan Beach)	Republican	January 3, 1935 – January 3, 1949	74th 75th 76th 77th 78th 79th 80th	Redistricted from the at-large district and Re-elected in 1934. Re-elected in 1936. Re-elected in 1938. Re-elected in 1940. Re-elected in 1942. Re-elected in 1944. Re-elected in 1946. Lost re-election.	1943–1953
Fred Marshall (Grove City)	Democratic (DFL)	January 3, 1949 – January 3, 1963	81st 82nd 83rd 84th 85th 86th 87th	Elected in 1948. Re-elected in 1950. Re-elected in 1952. Re-elected in 1954. Re-elected in 1956. Re-elected in 1958. Re-elected in 1960. Retired.	1943–1953
Fred Marshall (Grove City)	Democratic (DFL)	January 3, 1949 – January 3, 1963	81st 82nd 83rd 84th 85th 86th 87th	Elected in 1948. Re-elected in 1950. Re-elected in 1952. Re-elected in 1954. Re-elected in 1956. Re-elected in 1958. Re-elected in 1960. Retired.	1953–1963; Aitkin County, Benton County, Cass County, Crow Wing County, Hubbard County, Meeker County, Mille Lacs County, Morrison County, Pine County, Redwood County, Renville County, Sherburne County, Stearns County, Todd County, Wadena County and Wright County
Alec G. Olson (Montevideo)	Democratic (DFL)	January 3, 1963 – January 3, 1967	88th 89th	Elected in 1962. Re-elected in 1964. Lost re-election.	1963–1973; Benton County, Big Stone County, Chippewa County, Crow Wing County, Kandiyohi County, Lac qui Parle County, Lincoln County, Lyon County, Meeker County, Mille Lacs County, Redwood County, Renville County, Sherburne County, Stearns County, Stevens County, Swift County, Wright County and Yellow Medicine County
John M. Zwach (Walnut Grove)	Republican	January 3, 1967 – January 3, 1975	90th 91st 92nd 93rd	Elected in 1966. Re-elected in 1968. Re-elected in 1970. Re-elected in 1972. Retired.	1963–1973; Benton County, Big Stone County, Chippewa County, Crow Wing County, Kandiyohi County, Lac qui Parle County, Lincoln County, Lyon County, Meeker County, Mille Lacs County, Redwood County, Renville County, Sherburne County, Stearns County, Stevens County, Swift County, Wright County and Yellow Medicine County
John M. Zwach (Walnut Grove)	Republican	January 3, 1967 – January 3, 1975	90th 91st 92nd 93rd	Elected in 1966. Re-elected in 1968. Re-elected in 1970. Re-elected in 1972. Retired.	1973–1983; Benton County, Big Stone County, Chippewa County, Cottonwood County, Jackson County, Kandiyohi County, Lac qui Parle County, Lincoln County, Lyon County, Meeker County, Mille Lacs County, Murray County, Nobles County, Pipestone County, Redwood County, Renville County, Rock, Sherburne County, Stearns County, Wright County, Yellow Medicine County and Hennepin County (Part)
Rick Nolan (Waite Park)	Democratic (DFL)	January 3, 1975 – January 3, 1981	94th 95th 96th	Elected in 1974. Re-elected in 1976. Re-elected in 1978. Retired.	1973–1983; Benton County, Big Stone County, Chippewa County, Cottonwood County, Jackson County, Kandiyohi County, Lac qui Parle County, Lincoln County, Lyon County, Meeker County, Mille Lacs County, Murray County, Nobles County, Pipestone County, Redwood County, Renville County, Rock, Sherburne County, Stearns County, Wright County, Yellow Medicine County and Hennepin County (Part)
Vin Weber (St. Cloud)	Republican	January 3, 1981 – January 3, 1983	97th	Elected in 1980. Redistricted to the 2nd district.	1973–1983; Benton County, Big Stone County, Chippewa County, Cottonwood County, Jackson County, Kandiyohi County, Lac qui Parle County, Lincoln County, Lyon County, Meeker County, Mille Lacs County, Murray County, Nobles County, Pipestone County, Redwood County, Renville County, Rock, Sherburne County, Stearns County, Wright County, Yellow Medicine County and Hennepin County (Part)
Gerry Sikorski (Stillwater)	Democratic (DFL)	January 3, 1983 – January 3, 1993	98th 99th 100th 101st 102nd	Elected in 1982. Re-elected in 1984. Re-elected in 1986. Re-elected in 1988. Re-elected in 1990. Lost re-election.	1983–1993; Anoka County, Washington County (Majority), Benton County (Part), Hennepin County (Part), Ramsey County (Part) and Wright County (Part)
Rod Grams (Ramsey)	Republican	January 3, 1993 – January 3, 1995	103rd	Elected in 1992. Retired to run for U.S. senator.	1993–2003; Anoka County, Washington County and Dakota County (Part)
Bill Luther (Stillwater)	Democratic (DFL)	January 3, 1995 – January 3, 2003	104th 105th 106th 107th	Elected in 1994. Re-elected in 1996. Re-elected in 1998. Re-elected in 2000. Redistricted to the 2nd district and lost re-election.	1993–2003; Anoka County, Washington County and Dakota County (Part)
Mark Kennedy (Watertown)	Republican	January 3, 2003 – January 3, 2007	108th 109th	Redistricted from the 2nd district and Re-elected in 2002. Re-elected in 2004. Retired to run for U.S. senator.	2003–2013 Benton County, Sherburne County, Wright County, Anoka County (Part), Hennepin County (Part), Stearns County (Part) and Washington County (Part)
Michele Bachmann (Stillwater)	Republican	January 3, 2007 – January 3, 2015	110th 111th 112th 113th	Elected in 2006. Re-elected in 2008. Re-elected in 2010. Re-elected in 2012. Retired.	2003–2013 Benton County, Sherburne County, Wright County, Anoka County (Part), Hennepin County (Part), Stearns County (Part) and Washington County (Part)
Michele Bachmann (Stillwater)	Republican	January 3, 2007 – January 3, 2015	110th 111th 112th 113th	Elected in 2006. Re-elected in 2008. Re-elected in 2010. Re-elected in 2012. Retired.	2013–2023 Benton County, Sherburne County, Wright County, Anoka County (Part), Carver County (Part), Hennepin County (Part), Stearns County (Part) and Washington County (Part)
Tom Emmer (Delano)	Republican	January 3, 2015 – present	114th 115th 116th 117th 118th 119th	Elected in 2014. Re-elected in 2016. Re-elected in 2018. Re-elected in 2020. Re-elected in 2022. Re-elected in 2024. Re-elected in 2026.	2013–2023 Benton County, Sherburne County, Wright County, Anoka County (Part), Carver County (Part), Hennepin County (Part), Stearns County (Part) and Washington County (Part)
Tom Emmer (Delano)	Republican	January 3, 2015 – present	114th 115th 116th 117th 118th 119th	Elected in 2014. Re-elected in 2016. Re-elected in 2018. Re-elected in 2020. Re-elected in 2022. Re-elected in 2024. Re-elected in 2026.	2023–present Benton County, Carver County, Sherburne County, Wright County, Anoka County (Part), Hennepin County (Part) and Stearns County (Part)

== Recent elections ==
=== 1972–1982 ===
==== 1972 ====
Rick Nolan ran unsuccessfully for Minnesota's 6th congressional district seat in the United States House of Representatives in the election of November 7, 1972.

1972 Sixth Congressional District of Minnesota Elections
Party	Candidate	Votes	%
Republican	John M. Zwach {incumbent}	114,537	51.0
Democratic (DFL)	Rick Nolan	109,955	49.0
Write-in		not recorded	
Turnout		224,492	
Registered electors			
Republican win (new boundaries)			

==== 1974 ====
Rick Nolan was elected in his second run on November 5, 1974, to the 94th Congress.

1974 Sixth Congressional District of Minnesota Elections
Party	Candidate	Votes	%	±%
Democratic (DFL)	Rick Nolan	96,465	55.4	+6.4
Republican	Jon Grunseth	77,797	44.6	–6.4
Write-in		not recorded		
Turnout		174,262		
Registered electors				
Democratic (DFL) gain from Republican		Swing	+6.4	

==== 1976 ====
Nolan was reelected in 1976 to the 95th Congress.

1976 Sixth Congressional District of Minnesota Elections
Party	Candidate	Votes	%	±%
Democratic (DFL)	Rick Nolan (incumbent)	147,507	59.8	+4.4
Republican	James Anderson (IR)	99,201	40.2	
Write-in		not recorded		
Turnout		246,708		
Registered electors				
Democratic (DFL) hold		Swing	+4.4	

==== 1978 ====
Nolan was reelected to the 96th Congress on November 7, 1978.

1978 Sixth Congressional District of Minnesota Elections
Party	Candidate	Votes	%	±%
Democratic (DFL)	Rick Nolan (incumbent)	115,880	55.3	–4.5
Republican	Russ Bjorhus (IR)	93,742	44.7	+4.5
Write-in		not recorded		
Turnout		209,622		
Registered electors				
Democratic (DFL) hold		Swing	–4.5	

==== 1980 ====
Vin Weber was elected to serve in the 97th Congress.

1980 Sixth Congressional District of Minnesota Elections
Party	Candidate	Votes	%	±%
Republican	Vin Weber (IR)	140,402	52.7	+7.9
Democratic (DFL)	Archie Baumann (DFL)	126,173	47.3	–7.9
Write-in		not recorded		
Turnout		266,575		
Registered electors				
Republican gain from Democratic (DFL)		Swing	+7.9	

=== 1982–1992 ===
==== 1982 ====
Gerry Sikorski (DFL) was elected to the 98th Congress on November 2, 1982.

1982 Sixth Congressional District of Minnesota Elections
Party	Candidate	Votes	%
Democratic (DFL)	Gerry Sikorski (DFL)	109,246	50.8
Republican	Arlen Erdahl (IR) (incumbent)	105,734	49.2
Turnout		214,980	
Registered electors			
Democratic (DFL) win (new boundaries)			

==== 1984 ====
Sikorski was reelected to the 99th Congress on November 6, 1984, and to the 100th Congress, 101st Congress, and 102nd Congress in 1986, 1988, and 1990.

1984 Sixth Congressional District of Minnesota Elections
Party	Candidate	Votes	%	±%
Democratic (DFL)	Gerry Sikorski (DFL) (incumbent)	154,603	60.5	+9.7
Republican	Patrick Trueman (IR)	101,058	39.5	–9.7
Turnout		255,661		
Registered electors				
Democratic (DFL) hold		Swing	+9.7	

=== 1986 to 2006 ===
The elected representatives were:

- Gerry Sikorski 100th Congress, 101st Congress, and 102nd Congress
- Rod Grams 103rd Congress
- Bill Luther 104th Congress, 105th Congress, 106th Congress, and 107th Congress

=== 2002–2012 ===
==== 2002 ====
Minnesota's 6th Congressional district election, 2002
Party	Candidate	Votes	%
Republican	Mark Kennedy (incumbent)	164,747	57.3
Democratic (DFL)	Janet Robert	100,738	35.1
Independence	Dan Becker	21,484	7.5
Write-in		343	0.1
Total votes		287,312	100.0
Republican win (new boundaries)			

==== 2004 ====
Minnesota's 6th Congressional district election, 2004
Party	Candidate	Votes	%	±%
Republican	Mark Kennedy (incumbent)	203,669	54.0	–3.3
Democratic (DFL)	Patty Wetterling	173,309	45.9	+10.9
Write-in		246	0.1	–0.1
Total votes		377,224	100.0	
Republican hold		Swing	–7.1	

==== 2006 ====
Minnesota's 6th Congressional district election, 2006
Party	Candidate	Votes	%	±%
Republican	Michele Bachmann	151,248	50.1	–3.9
Democratic (DFL)	Patty Wetterling	127,144	42.1	–3.9
Independence	John Binkowski	23,557	7.8	N/a
Write-in		239	0.1	+0.0
Total votes		302,188	100.0	
Republican hold		Swing	–0.0	

==== 2008 ====
Minnesota's 6th congressional district election, 2008
Party	Candidate	Votes	%	±%
Republican	Michele Bachmann (incumbent)	187,817	46.4	–3.6
Democratic (DFL)	Elwyn Tinklenberg	175,786	43.4	+1.4
Independence	Bob Anderson	40,643	10.0	+2.2
Write-in		479	0.1	+0.0
Total votes		404,725	100.0	
Republican hold		Swing	–2.5	

==== 2010 ====
Minnesota's 6th Congressional district election, 2010
Party	Candidate	Votes	%	±%
Republican	Michele Bachmann (incumbent)	159,476	52.5	+6.1
Democratic (DFL)	Tarryl Clark	120,846	39.8	–3.6
Independence	Bob Anderson	17,698	5.8	–4.2
Independent	Aubrey Immelsman	5,490	1.8	N/a
Write-in		181	0.1	–0.1
Total votes		303,691	100.0	
Republican hold		Swing	+4.9	

=== 2012–2022 ===
==== 2012 ====
Although Bachmann's home was not within the new boundaries of the 6th district, she legally ran for reelection and won.

Minnesota's 6th congressional district general election, 2012
Party	Candidate	Votes	%
Republican	Michele Bachmann (incumbent)	179,241	50.5
Democratic (DFL)	Jim Graves	174,944	49.3
Write-in		969	0.3
Total votes		355,154	100.0
Republican win (new boundaries)			

==== 2014 ====
Minnesota's 6th congressional district general election, 2014
Party	Candidate	Votes	%	±%
Republican	Tom Emmer	133,332	56.3	+5.8
Democratic (DFL)	Joe Perske	90,926	38.4	–10.9
Independence	John Denney	12,459	5.3	N/a
Write-in				
Republican hold		Swing		

==== 2016 ====
Minnesota's 6th congressional district general election, 2016
Party	Candidate	Votes	%	±%
Republican	Tom Emmer (incumbent)	235,385	65.6	+9.3
Democratic (DFL)	David Snyder	123,010	34.3	–4.1
Write-in				
Republican hold		Swing		

==== 2018 ====
Minnesota's 6th congressional district general election, 2018
Party	Candidate	Votes	%	±%
Republican	Tom Emmer (incumbent)	192,931	61.11	–4.5
Democratic (DFL)	Ian Todd	122,332	38.75	+4.5
Write-in				
Republican hold		Swing		

==== 2020 ====
Minnesota's 6th congressional district general election, 2020
Party	Candidate	Votes	%	±%
Republican	Tom Emmer (incumbent)	270,901	65.7	+4.3
Democratic (DFL)	Tawnja Zahradka	140,853	34.2	−4.3
Write-in		553	0.1	
Republican hold		Swing		

=== 2012–2022 ===
==== 2022 ====
Minnesota's 6th congressional district general election, 2022
Party	Candidate	Votes	%
Republican	Tom Emmer (incumbent)	198,145	61.97
Democratic (DFL)	Jeanne Hendricks	120,852	37.79
Write-in		770	0.24
Republican win (new boundaries)			

==== 2024 ====
Minnesota's 6th congressional district general election, 2024
Party	Candidate	Votes	%	±%
Republican	Tom Emmer (incumbent)	257,527	62.68	
Democratic (DFL)	Jeanne Hendricks	152,700	37.16	
Write-in		653	0.16	
Republican hold		Swing		

== See also ==
- Minnesota's congressional districts
- List of United States congressional districts
