= 2014 Minnesota elections =

2014 Minnesota general election
- November 4, 2014
- Turnout: 50.51%

A general election was held in the U.S. state of Minnesota on November 4, 2014. All of Minnesota's executive officers were up for election as well as all the seats in the Minnesota House of Representatives, several state judicial seats, a United States Senate seat, all of Minnesota's eight seats in the United States House of Representatives, and several seats for local offices. A primary election was held on August 12, 2014, to nominate major political party candidates for partisan offices and candidates for nonpartisan offices.

== State elections ==
=== Governor ===
Incumbent Democratic–Farmer–Labor Governor Mark Dayton sought re-election. Other candidates included Republican Hennepin County Commissioner Jeff Johnson, Hannah Nicollet of the Independence Party, Chris Wright of the Grassroots Party, and Libertarian Chris Holbrook. Republicans Merrill Anderson, Scott Honour, former state House Minority Leader Marty Seifert, former state House Speaker Kurt Zellers, and Democrats Bill Dahn and Leslie Davis were defeated in the primary election. Republicans St. Louis County Commissioner Rob Farnsworth and state Senator Dave Thompson withdrew after failing to win their party's endorsement at the Republican state convention. Dayton was re-elected to a second term.

=== Attorney General ===
Incumbent Democratic–Farmer–Labor Attorney General Lori Swanson sought re-election. Other candidates included Republican state Senator Scott Newman, Brandan Borgos of the Independence Party, Libertarian Mary O'Connor, former DFL state Representative Andy Dawkins of the Green Party, and Dan Vacek running under the label "Legal Marijuana Now." Republican Sharon Anderson was defeated in the primary election. Swanson was re-elected to a third term.

=== Secretary of State ===
Incumbent Democratic–Farmer–Labor Secretary of State Mark Ritchie announced on June 4, 2013, that he would not seek re-election. Candidates that sought election include DFL state Representative Steve Simon, former Republican state Representative Dan Severson, Bob Helland of the Independence Party, and Libertarian Bob Odden. Democrats Dick Franson and Gregg Iverson, and David Singleton of the Independence Party were defeated in the primary election. Democrats Rachel Bohman and former state Representative Jeremy Kalin withdrew in 2013 several months following their announcements. Republican Dennis Nguyen withdrew in mid-March 2014 following reports of an alleged strip club visit. DFL state Representative Debra Hilstrom and former Republican state Senator John Howe withdrew after failing to win their party's endorsement at their party's state convention. Simon was elected.

=== State Auditor ===
Incumbent Democratic–Farmer–Labor State Auditor Rebecca Otto announced on August 20, 2013, that she would seek re-election. Other candidates included Republican Randy Gilbert, Pat Dean of the Independence Party, Judith Schwartzbacker of the Grassroots Party, and Libertarian Keegan Iversen. Former DFL state House Minority Leader Matt Entenza was defeated in the primary election. Otto was re-elected to a third term.

=== Minnesota House of Representatives ===
All 134 seats in the Minnesota House of Representatives were up for election. The Republican Party of Minnesota won a majority of seats.

=== Judiciary ===
Minnesota Supreme Court justices Wilhelmina Wright and David Lillehaug sought election to six-year terms following their respective appointments in 2012 and 2013 by Governor Mark Dayton. Several seats on the Minnesota Court of Appeals and the Minnesota District Courts were up for election as well. Both Wright and Lillehaug were elected.

== Federal elections ==
=== United States Senate ===
Incumbent Democratic–Farmer–Labor Senator Al Franken sought re-election. Other candidates included Republican Mike McFadden, Steve Carlson of the Independence Party, and Libertarian Heather Johnson. Republicans state Representative Jim Abeler, David Carlson, Patrick Munro, and Ole Savior; Democrat Sandra Henningsgard; and Tom Books, Jack Shepard, Kevin Terrell, and Stephen Williams of the Independence Party were defeated in the primary election. Republicans Chris Dahlberg, Monti Moreno, state Senator Julianne Ortman, and Phillip Parrish withdrew after failing to win their party's endorsement at the Republican state convention. Franken was re-elected to a second term.

=== United States House of Representatives ===
All of Minnesota's eight seats in the United States House of Representatives were up for election. No political party gained or lost seats.
