= 2018 Minnesota Secretary of State election =

- November 6, 2018
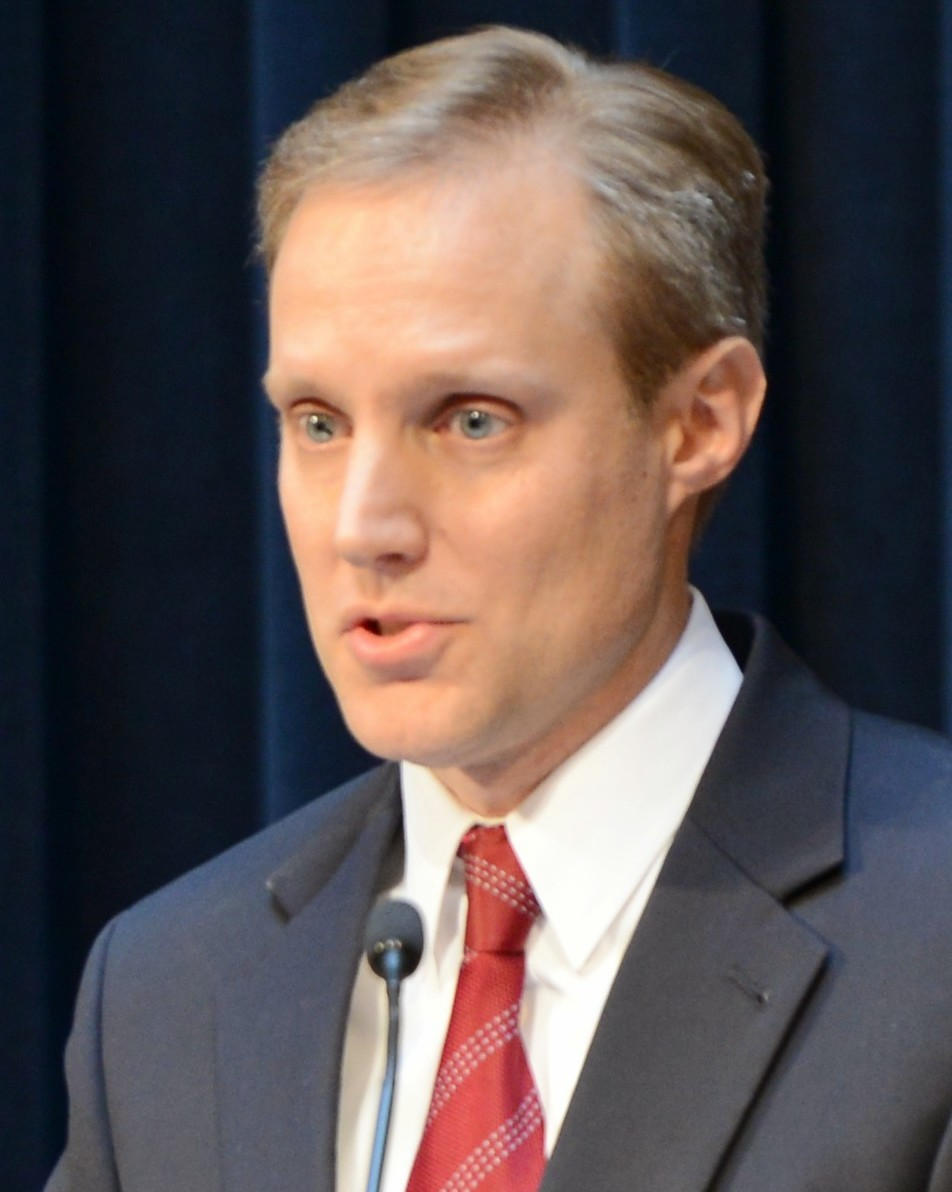

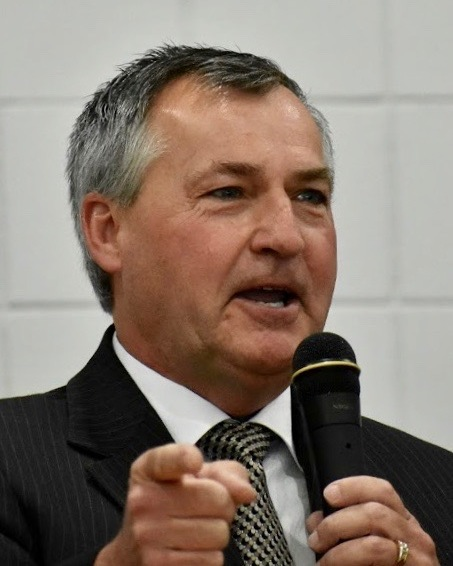
Nominee	Steve Simon	John Howe
Party	Democratic (DFL)	Republican
Popular vote	1,328,502	1,109,093
Percentage	52.25%	43.62%
- Simon: 40–50% 50–60% 60–70% 70–80% 80–90% >90% Howe: 40–50% 50–60% 60–70% 70–80% 80–90% >90%
Secretary of State before election
Steve Simon
Democratic (DFL)
Elected Secretary of State
Steve Simon
Democratic (DFL)

The 2018 Minnesota Secretary of State election was held on November 6, 2018, to elect the secretary of state of the U.S. state of Minnesota. Steve Simon, the incumbent and Minnesota Democratic–Farmer–Labor Party (DFL) nominee, won the election.

== Background ==
DFL incumbent Steve Simon was first elected in 2014—succeeding two-term DFL incumbent Mark Ritchie, who did not seek re-election. Simon announced on January 23, 2018, that he would seek re-election.

== Candidates ==
=== Republican Party of Minnesota ===
- John Howe, member of the Minnesota Senate from 2011 to 2013; candidate for the Republican nomination for Minnesota Secretary of State in 2014

Howe was endorsed by the Republicans on June 2, 2018, at their state convention.

=== Minnesota Democratic–Farmer–Labor Party ===
- Steve Simon, incumbent since 2015

Simon was endorsed by the DFL on June 1, 2018, at their state convention.

=== Minor parties and independents ===
- William Denney, Independence Party of Minnesota

== General election ==
=== Predictions ===
Source	Ranking	As of
Governing	Likely D	October 11, 2018

=== Results ===
Minnesota Secretary of State election, 2018
Party	Candidate	Votes	%	±%
Democratic (DFL)	Steve Simon (incumbent)	1,328,502	52.25%	+5.21%
Republican	John Howe	1,109,093	43.62%	−2.25%
Independence	William Denney	103,610	4.08%	−0.83%
Write-in		1,317	0.05%	-0.01%
Total votes		2,542,522	100.0%	N/A
Democratic (DFL) hold				

==== By congressional district ====
Simon won four of eight congressional districts, with the remaining four going to Howe, including one that elected a Democrat.

District	Simon	Howe	Representative
1st	45%	50%	Jim Hagedorn
2nd	50%	46%	Angie Craig
3rd	53%	43%	Dean Phillips
4th	65%	31%	Betty McCollum
5th	78%	18%	Ilhan Omar
6th	39%	57%	Tom Emmer
7th	38%	58%	Collin Peterson
8th	46%	50%	Pete Stauber

== See also ==
- Minnesota elections, 2018
