= 2014 Minnesota Secretary of State election =

- November 4, 2014
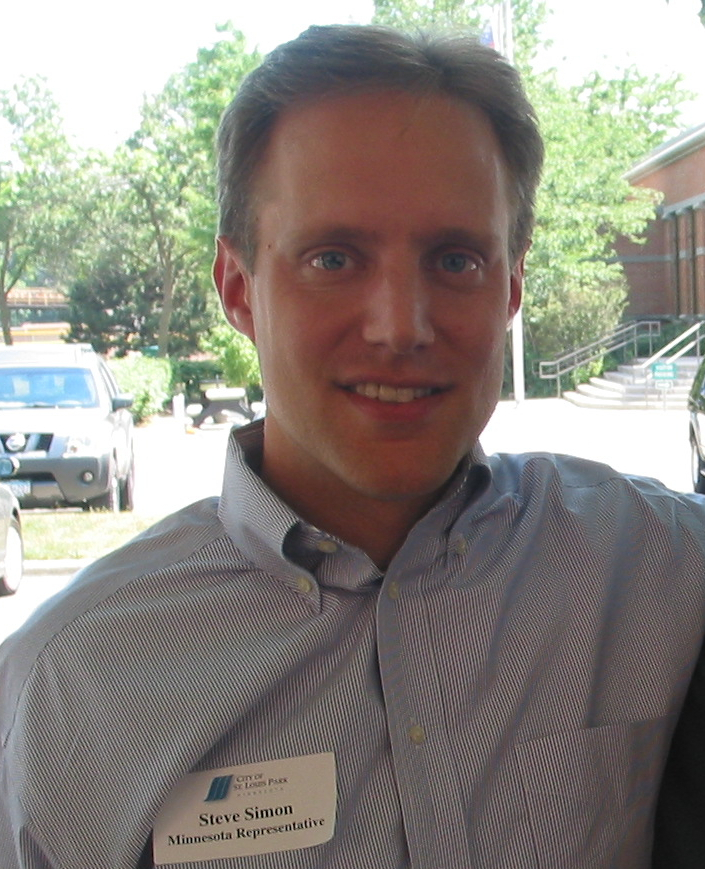

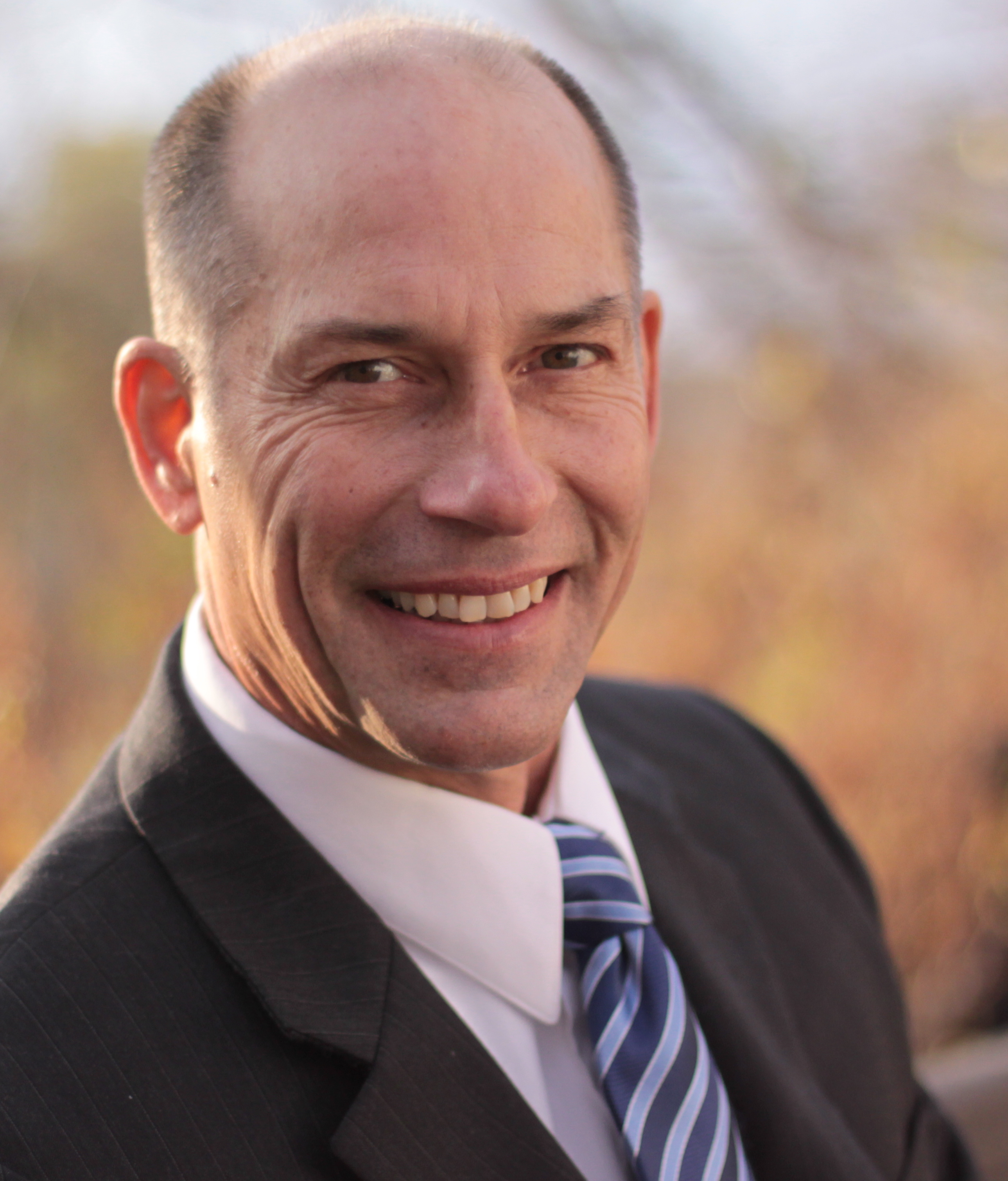
Nominee	Steve Simon	Dan Severson
Party	Democratic (DFL)	Republican
Popular vote	901,450	879,022
Percentage	47.04%	45.87%
- Simon: 40–50% 50–60% 60–70% 70–80% 80–90% >90% Severson: 30–40% 40–50% 50–60% 60–70% 70–80% 80–90% >90% Tie: 20–30% 30–40% 40–50% 50% No votes
Secretary of State before election
Mark Ritchie
Democratic (DFL)
Elected Secretary of State
Steve Simon
Democratic (DFL)

The 2014 Minnesota Secretary of State election was held on November 4, 2014, to elect the Minnesota Secretary of State.

Incumbent Democratic–Farmer–Labor Secretary of State Mark Ritchie did not run for re-election to a third term in office. Primary elections were held on August 12, 2014. The Democratic–Farmer–Labor Party (DFL) nominated State Representative Steve Simon, the Republican Party nominated State Representative Dan Severson and the Independence Party nominated business process analyst Bob Helland.

Simon narrowly defeated Severson in the general election.

== Democratic–Farmer–Labor primary ==
The Democratic–Farmer–Labor endorsement was made on May 31, 2014. State Representative Steve Simon was endorsed by acclamation over fellow State Representative Debra Hilstrom, who conceded before the results of the first ballot were announced and withdrew from the race.

=== Candidates ===
==== Declared ====
- Dick Franson, perennial candidate
- Gregg Iverson
- Steve Simon, state representative (party endorsed)

==== Withdrew ====
- Rachel Bohman, former Hennepin County elections manager
- Debra Hilstrom, state representative
- Jeremy Kalin, former state representative

==== Declined ====
- Roger Reinert, state senator
- Mark Ritchie, incumbent secretary of state
- Ryan Winkler, state representative

=== Results ===
Democratic primary election results
Party	Candidate	Votes	%
Democratic (DFL)	Steve Simon	65,634	42.67
Democratic (DFL)	Dick Franson	44,700	29.06
Democratic (DFL)	Gregg Iverson	43,478	28.27
Total votes		153,812	100

== Republican primary ==
The Republican endorsement was made on May 30, 2014. Former state representative Dan Severson, the Republican nominee for secretary of state in 2010, was endorsed after one ballot when former state senator John Howe withdrew his name from consideration.

=== Candidates ===
==== Declared ====
- Dan Severson, former state representative, nominee for secretary of state in 2010 and candidate for the U.S. Senate in 2012

==== Withdrew ====
- John Howe, former state senator
- Dennis Nguyen, investment executive

==== Declined ====
- Ted Daley, former state senator
- Pat Garofalo, state representative
- Kent Kaiser, professor at Northwestern College
- Mary Kiffmeyer, state senator and former secretary of State
- Joyce Peppin, state representative

=== Results ===
Republican primary election results
Party	Candidate	Votes	%
Republican	Dan Severson	152,754	100
Total votes		152,754	100

== Independence primary ==
The Independence Party endorsement was made on May 17, 2014. Bob Helland won the endorsement.

=== Candidates ===
- Bob Helland, business process analyst (party endorsed)
- David Singleton

=== Results ===
Independence primary election results
Party	Candidate	Votes	%
Independence	Bob Helland	3,059	51.52
Independence	David Singleton	2,879	48.48
Total votes		5,938	100

== General election ==
=== Candidates ===
- Steve Simon (DFL), state representative
- Dan Severson (Republican), former state representative, nominee for secretary of state in 2010 and candidate for the U.S. Senate in 2012
- Bob Helland (Independence), business process analyst
- Bob Odden (Libertarian)

=== Polling ===
Poll source	Date(s) administered	Sample size	Margin of error	Steve Simon (DFL)	Dan Severson (R)	Bob Helland (IP)
Gravis Marketing	July 2–3, 2014	879	± 3%	46%	41%	14%

=== Results ===
Minnesota Secretary of State election, 2014
Party	Candidate	Votes	%	±%
Democratic (DFL)	Steve Simon	901,450	47.04%	−2.06%
Republican	Dan Severson	879,022	45.87%	+0.23%
Independence	Bob Helland	94,065	4.91%	−0.28%
Libertarian	Bob Odden	40,729	2.13%	N/A
Write-in		1,134	0.06%	-0.01%
Total votes		1,916,400	100.0%	
Democratic (DFL) hold				

=== Results by congressional district ===
Despite losing the state, Severson won five of eight congressional districts, including two that elected Democrats.

District	Simon	Severson	Representative
1st	42%	50%	Tim Walz
2nd	43%	50%	John Kline
3rd	43%	51%	Erik Paulsen
4th	56%	37%	Betty McCollum
5th	69%	24%	Keith Ellison
6th	36%	57%	Tom Emmer
7th	40%	52%	Collin Peterson
8th	48%	45%	Rick Nolan

== See also ==
- 2014 Minnesota elections
