= 2022 Minnesota Secretary of State election =

- November 8, 2022
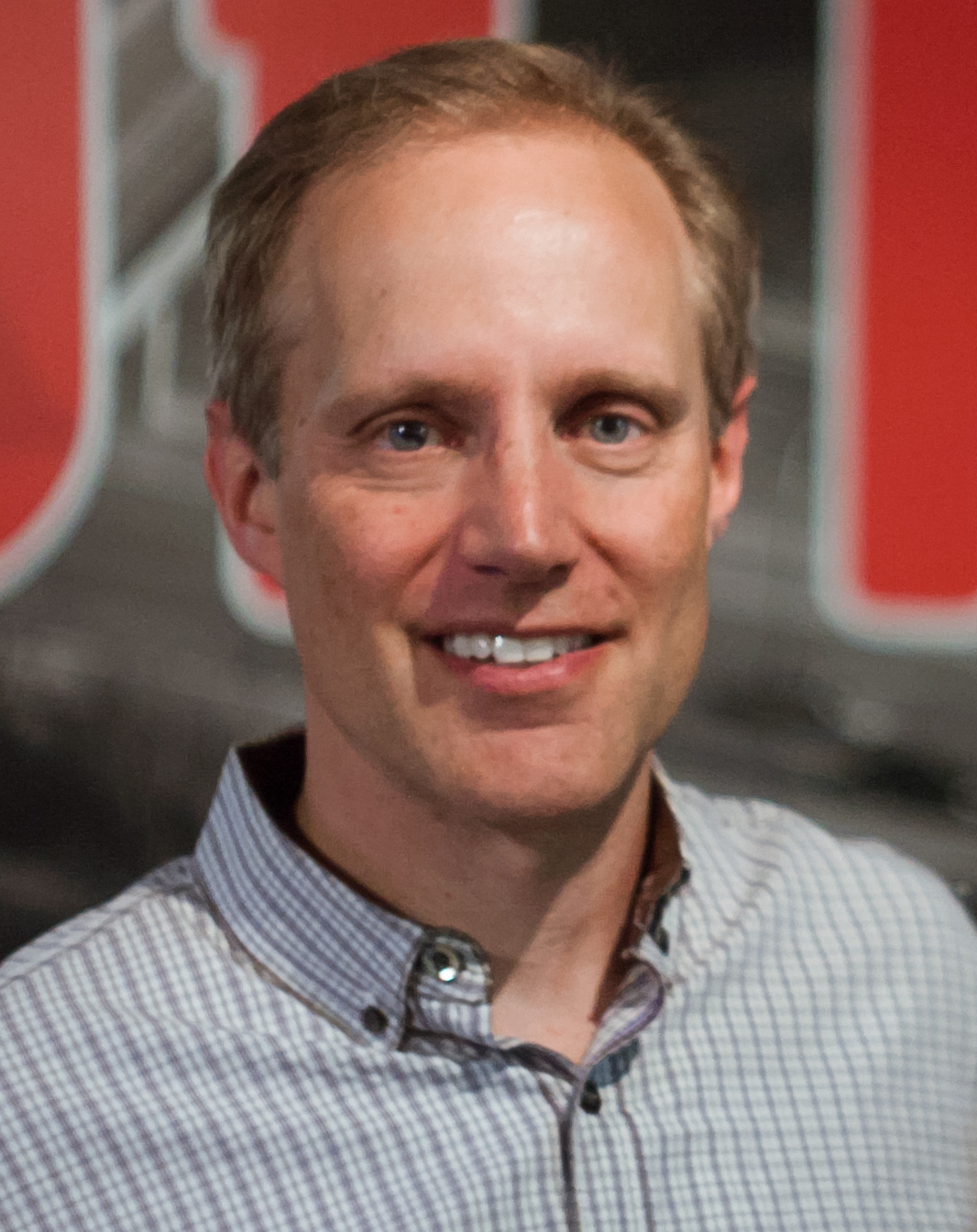

| Nominee | Steve Simon | Kim Crockett |
| Party | Democratic (DFL) | Republican |
| Popular vote | 1,345,685 | 1,119,949 |
| Percentage | 54.53% | 45.38% |
- Simon: 50–60% 60–70% 70–80% 80–90% >90% Crockett: 50–60% 60–70% 70–80% 80–90% >90%
Secretary of State before election
Steve Simon
Democratic (DFL)
Elected Secretary of State
Steve Simon
Democratic (DFL)

The 2022 Minnesota Secretary of State election was held on November 8, 2022, to elect the Secretary of State of Minnesota. Incumbent DFLer Steve Simon won re-election to a third term.

== Democratic–Farmer–Labor primary ==
=== Candidates ===
==== Nominated ====
- Steve Simon, incumbent secretary of state

==== Eliminated in primary ====
- Steve Carlson, perennial candidate

=== Endorsements ===
Steve Simon

Organizations

- Minnesota AFL–CIO
- Minnesota Democratic–Farmer–Labor Party
- TakeAction Minnesota

=== Results ===
Results by county: Simon: 50–60%; 60–70%; 70–80%; 80–90%; Carlson: 50–60%

Democratic primary results
| Party | Candidate | Votes | % |
|---|---|---|---|
| Democratic (DFL) | Steve Simon (incumbent) | 285,314 | 72.51 |
| Democratic (DFL) | Steve Carlson | 108,144 | 27.49 |
| Total votes | | 393,458 | 100.00 |

== Republican primary ==
=== Candidates ===
==== Nominated ====
- Kim Crockett, former vice president of the conservative think tank Center of the American Experiment

==== Eliminated in primary ====
- Erik van Mechelen

==== Dropped out at convention ====
- Kelly Jahner-Byrne, candidate in the 2020 Minnesota House of Representatives election for seat 53B

==== Withdrew before convention ====
- Phillip Parrish, former U.S. naval intelligence officer

=== Results ===
Results by county: Crockett: 50–60%; 60–70%; 70–80%

Republican primary results
| Party | Candidate | Votes | % |
|---|---|---|---|
| Republican | Kim Crockett | 190,156 | 63.15 |
| Republican | Eric van Mechelen | 110,940 | 36.85 |
| Total votes | | 301,096 | 100.00 |

== General election ==
=== Debate ===
A debate was held on October 2 by WCCO.

=== Predictions ===
| Source | Ranking | As of |
|---|---|---|
| Sabato's Crystal Ball | Leans D | November 3, 2022 |
| Elections Daily | Leans D | November 7, 2022 |

=== Post-primary endorsements ===
Steve Simon (DFL)

U.S. Representatives

- Adam Kinzinger, U.S. Representative for Illinois's 16th congressional district (2011–2023) (Republican)

Newspapers

- Star Tribune
Kim Crockett (R)

U.S. Presidents

- Donald Trump, President of the United States (2017–2021)

State legislators

- Mary Kiffmeyer, state senator from the 30th district and former Minnesota Secretary of State (1999–2007)
- Dean Urdahl, state representative (2003–)

Organizations

- Republican Party of Minnesota
- Tea Party Patriots Citizens Fund

=== Polling ===
Graphical summary

| Poll source | Date(s) administered | Sample size (Note: Key: A – all adults RV – registered voters LV – likely voters V – unclear) | Margin of error | Steve Simon (DFL) | Kim Crockett (R) | Undecided |
|---|---|---|---|---|---|---|
| SurveyUSA (Note: This poll was sponsored by KSTP-TV) | Oct. 26 – 30, 2022 | 836 (LV) | ± 3.9% | 47% | 41% | 12% |
| St. Cloud State University | Oct. 10 – 30, 2022 | 212 (A) | ± 8% | 52% | 37% | 11% |
| Trafalgar Group (R) (Note: This poll was sponsored by Alpha News) | Oct. 17 – 19, 2022 | 1,091 (LV) | ± 2.9% | 46.6% | 44.6% | 8.9% |
| Embold Research | Oct. 10 – 14, 2022 | 1,585 (LV) | ± 2.6% | 47.9% | 40.8% | 11.3% |
| SurveyUSA | Sep. 30 – Oct. 3, 2022 | 604 (LV) | ± 4.4% | 42% | 40% | 18% |
| Trafalgar Group (R) (Note: This poll was sponsored by Alpha News) | Sep. 14, 2022 | 1,079 (LV) | ± 2.9% | 46.2% | 45.2% | 8.5% |
| Mason-Dixon | Sep. 12 – 14, 2022 | 800 (LV) | ± 3.5% | 47.6% | 40.0% | 12.4% |
| SurveyUSA | Aug. 30 – Sep. 4, 2022 | 562 (LV) | ± 4.9% | 42% | 38% | 20% |

=== Results ===
2022 Minnesota Secretary of State election
| Party | Candidate | Votes | % | ±% |
|---|---|---|---|---|
| Democratic (DFL) | Steve Simon (incumbent) | 1,345,685 | 54.53% | +2.28% |
| Republican | Kim Crockett | 1,119,949 | 45.38% | +1.76% |
| Write-in | | 2,095 | 0.08% | +0.03% |
| Total votes | | 2,467,729 | 100.00% | N/A |
| Democratic (DFL) hold | | | | |

==== By county ====
| County | Steve Simon DFL | | Kim Crockett GOP | | Write-in | | Margin | | Total votes |
| County | % | # | % | # | % | # | % | # | Total votes |
|---|---|---|---|---|---|---|---|---|---|
| Aitkin | 38.87% | 3,164 | 61.08% | 4,971 | 0.05% | 4 | -22.20% | -1,807 | 8,139 |
| Anoka | 49.80% | 76,983 | 50.11% | 77,463 | 0.09% | 142 | -0.31% | -480 | 154,588 |
| Becker | 33.67% | 4,896 | 66.26% | 9,636 | 0.07% | 10 | -32.60% | -4,740 | 14,542 |
| Beltrami | 48.15% | 8,622 | 51.78% | 9,272 | 0.08% | 14 | -3.63% | -650 | 17,908 |
| Benton | 35.83% | 5,797 | 64.10% | 10,372 | 0.07% | 12 | -28.27% | -4,575 | 16,181 |
| Big Stone | 39.65% | 952 | 60.27% | 1,447 | 0.08% | 2 | -20.62% | -495 | 2,401 |
| Blue Earth | 53.03% | 13,824 | 46.90% | 12,227 | 0.07% | 18 | 6.13% | 1,597 | 26,069 |
| Brown | 35.70% | 4,091 | 64.26% | 7,364 | 0.04% | 5 | -28.56% | -3,273 | 11,460 |
| Carlton | 51.96% | 8,166 | 47.98% | 7,541 | 0.06% | 10 | 3.98% | 625 | 15,717 |
| Carver | 47.65% | 25,398 | 52.28% | 27,863 | 0.07% | 38 | -4.62% | -2,465 | 53,299 |
| Cass | 36.21% | 5,450 | 63.76% | 9,596 | 0.03% | 5 | -27.55% | -4,146 | 15,051 |
| Chippewa | 38.24% | 1,878 | 61.74% | 3,032 | 0.02% | 1 | -23.50% | -1,154 | 4,911 |
| Chisago | 38.30% | 9,752 | 61.65% | 15,698 | 0.05% | 13 | -23.35% | -5,946 | 25,463 |
| Clay | 51.60% | 11,256 | 48.28% | 10,532 | 0.13% | 28 | 3.32% | 724 | 21,816 |
| Clearwater | 26.43% | 929 | 73.54% | 2,585 | 0.03% | 1 | -47.11% | -1,656 | 3,515 |
| Cook | 68.18% | 2,192 | 31.76% | 1,021 | 0.06% | 2 | 36.42% | 1,171 | 3,215 |
| Cottonwood | 32.90% | 1,506 | 66.90% | 3,062 | 0.20% | 9 | -34.00% | -1,556 | 4,577 |
| Crow Wing | 37.95% | 11,919 | 62.00% | 19,470 | 0.05% | 16 | -24.04% | -7,551 | 31,405 |
| Dakota | 57.75% | 111,687 | 42.10% | 81,422 | 0.15% | 286 | 15.65% | 30,265 | 193,395 |
| Dodge | 35.33% | 3,267 | 64.61% | 5,975 | 0.06% | 6 | -29.28% | -2,708 | 9,248 |
| Douglas | 35.94% | 7,013 | 63.97% | 12,484 | 0.09% | 18 | -28.03% | -5,471 | 19,515 |
| Faribault | 34.92% | 2,079 | 65.02% | 3,871 | 0.07% | 4 | -30.10% | -1,792 | 5,954 |
| Fillmore | 40.33% | 3,759 | 59.58% | 5,553 | 0.10% | 9 | -19.25% | -1,794 | 9,321 |
| Freeborn | 41.84% | 5,386 | 58.11% | 7,480 | 0.05% | 7 | -16.27% | -2,094 | 12,873 |
| Goodhue | 45.91% | 10,475 | 53.99% | 12,318 | 0.10% | 22 | -8.08% | -1,843 | 22,815 |
| Grant | 39.53% | 1,154 | 60.26% | 1,759 | 0.21% | 6 | -20.73% | -605 | 2,919 |
| Hennepin | 72.42% | 411,144 | 27.49% | 156,073 | 0.08% | 480 | 44.93% | 255,071 | 567,697 |
| Houston | 42.31% | 3,659 | 57.64% | 4,985 | 0.05% | 4 | -15.33% | -1,326 | 8,648 |
| Hubbard | 37.60% | 3,977 | 62.36% | 6,596 | 0.05% | 5 | -24.76% | -2,619 | 10,578 |
| Isanti | 33.74% | 6,278 | 66.20% | 12,320 | 0.06% | 11 | -32.47% | -6,042 | 18,609 |
| Itasca | 44.65% | 9,415 | 55.30% | 11,660 | 0.05% | 10 | -10.65% | -2,245 | 21,085 |
| Jackson | 33.95% | 1,533 | 65.99% | 2,980 | 0.07% | 3 | -32.04% | -1,447 | 4,516 |
| Kanabec | 35.06% | 2,468 | 64.91% | 4,569 | 0.03% | 2 | -29.85% | -2,101 | 7,039 |
| Kandiyohi | 39.11% | 7,013 | 60.86% | 10,913 | 0.03% | 5 | -21.75% | -3,900 | 17,931 |
| Kittson | 39.28% | 738 | 60.72% | 1,141 | 0.00% | 0 | -21.45% | -403 | 1,879 |
| Koochiching | 40.98% | 2,132 | 58.98% | 3,068 | 0.04% | 2 | -17.99% | -936 | 5,202 |
| Lac qui Parle | 40.51% | 1,263 | 59.43% | 1,853 | 0.06% | 2 | -18.92% | -590 | 3,118 |
| Lake | 53.53% | 3,009 | 46.34% | 2,605 | 0.12% | 7 | 7.19% | 404 | 5,621 |
| Lake of the Woods | 26.01% | 464 | 73.82% | 1,317 | 0.17% | 3 | -47.81% | -853 | 1,784 |
| Le Sueur | 37.79% | 4,919 | 62.15% | 8,090 | 0.06% | 8 | -24.36% | -3,171 | 13,017 |
| Lincoln | 32.43% | 781 | 67.52% | 1,626 | 0.04% | 1 | -35.09% | -845 | 2,408 |
| Lyon | 37.52% | 3,622 | 62.43% | 6,026 | 0.05% | 5 | -24.90% | -2,404 | 9,653 |
| Mahnomen | 43.21% | 690 | 56.73% | 906 | 0.06% | 1 | -13.53% | -216 | 1,597 |
| Marshall | 26.51% | 1,055 | 73.41% | 2,921 | 0.08% | 3 | -46.90% | -1,866 | 3,979 |
| Martin | 32.16% | 2,656 | 67.83% | 5,602 | 0.01% | 1 | -35.67% | -2,946 | 8,259 |
| McLeod | 34.75% | 5,644 | 65.18% | 10,586 | 0.07% | 11 | -30.43% | -4,942 | 16,241 |
| Meeker | 33.33% | 3,573 | 66.58% | 7,137 | 0.08% | 9 | -33.25% | -3,564 | 10,719 |
| Mille Lacs | 33.88% | 3,718 | 66.02% | 7,246 | 0.10% | 11 | -32.15% | -3,528 | 10,975 |
| Morrison | 26.03% | 3,954 | 73.90% | 11,226 | 0.07% | 10 | -47.87% | -7,272 | 15,190 |
| Mower | 47.87% | 6,657 | 52.07% | 7,241 | 0.06% | 8 | -4.20% | -584 | 13,906 |
| Murray | 30.77% | 1,182 | 69.17% | 2,657 | 0.05% | 2 | -38.40% | -1,475 | 3,841 |
| Nicollet | 52.78% | 7,947 | 47.11% | 7,093 | 0.11% | 16 | 5.67% | 854 | 15,056 |
| Nobles | 32.89% | 1,956 | 67.05% | 3,988 | 0.07% | 4 | -34.16% | -2,032 | 5,948 |
| Norman | 41.79% | 1,023 | 58.09% | 1,422 | 0.12% | 3 | -16.30% | -399 | 2,448 |
| Olmsted | 55.02% | 36,930 | 44.94% | 30,165 | 0.04% | 24 | 10.08% | 6,765 | 67,119 |
| Otter Tail | 32.82% | 9,219 | 67.10% | 18,846 | 0.08% | 22 | -34.28% | -9,627 | 28,087 |
| Pennington | 35.58% | 1,921 | 64.33% | 3,473 | 0.09% | 5 | -28.75% | -1,552 | 5,399 |
| Pine | 37.52% | 4,603 | 62.40% | 7,655 | 0.08% | 10 | -24.88% | -3,052 | 12,268 |
| Pipestone | 24.94% | 935 | 75.01% | 2,812 | 0.05% | 2 | -50.07% | -1,877 | 3,749 |
| Polk | 32.87% | 3,522 | 67.08% | 7,188 | 0.05% | 5 | -34.21% | -3,666 | 10,715 |
| Pope | 39.16% | 2,190 | 60.68% | 3,394 | 0.16% | 9 | -21.53% | -1,204 | 5,593 |
| Ramsey | 74.15% | 158,893 | 25.73% | 55,129 | 0.13% | 276 | 48.42% | 103,764 | 214,298 |
| Red Lake | 34.31% | 537 | 65.50% | 1,025 | 0.19% | 3 | -31.18% | -488 | 1,565 |
| Redwood | 30.12% | 1,921 | 69.81% | 4,452 | 0.06% | 4 | -39.69% | -2,531 | 6,377 |
| Renville | 35.20% | 2,197 | 64.74% | 4,041 | 0.06% | 4 | -29.54% | -1,844 | 6,242 |
| Rice | 53.50% | 14,953 | 46.44% | 12,980 | 0.07% | 19 | 7.06% | 1,973 | 27,952 |
| Rock | 29.41% | 1,193 | 70.56% | 2,862 | 0.02% | 1 | -41.15% | -1,669 | 4,056 |
| Roseau | 25.11% | 1,615 | 74.86% | 4,814 | 0.03% | 2 | -49.74% | -3,199 | 6,431 |
| Scott | 46.83% | 30,679 | 53.09% | 34,784 | 0.08% | 50 | -6.27% | -4,105 | 65,513 |
| Sherburne | 35.37% | 14,192 | 64.58% | 25,911 | 0.05% | 21 | -29.21% | -11,719 | 40,124 |
| Sibley | 32.55% | 2,125 | 67.36% | 4,397 | 0.09% | 6 | -34.80% | -2,272 | 6,528 |
| St. Louis | 60.13% | 55,261 | 39.78% | 36,555 | 0.09% | 81 | 20.36% | 18,706 | 91,897 |
| Stearns | 40.28% | 25,998 | 59.63% | 38,485 | 0.09% | 55 | -19.35% | -12,487 | 64,538 |
| Steele | 42.43% | 6,923 | 57.52% | 9,385 | 0.06% | 9 | -15.09% | -2,462 | 16,317 |
| Stevens | 39.66% | 1,585 | 60.29% | 2,409 | 0.05% | 2 | -20.62% | -824 | 3,996 |
| Swift | 39.87% | 1,551 | 60.10% | 2,338 | 0.03% | 1 | -20.23% | -787 | 3,890 |
| Todd | 29.04% | 3,126 | 70.85% | 7,626 | 0.10% | 11 | -41.81% | -4,500 | 10,763 |
| Traverse | 37.25% | 570 | 62.68% | 959 | 0.07% | 1 | -25.42% | -389 | 1,530 |
| Wabasha | 40.08% | 4,242 | 59.85% | 6,335 | 0.08% | 8 | -19.77% | -2,093 | 10,585 |
| Wadena | 28.34% | 1,668 | 71.66% | 4,218 | 0.00% | 0 | -43.32% | -2,550 | 5,886 |
| Waseca | 36.68% | 3,027 | 63.24% | 5,219 | 0.08% | 7 | -26.56% | -2,192 | 8,253 |
| Washington | 55.79% | 71,895 | 44.15% | 56,897 | 0.06% | 74 | 11.64% | 14,998 | 128,866 |
| Watonwan | 39.64% | 1,508 | 60.28% | 2,293 | 0.08% | 3 | -20.64% | -785 | 3,804 |
| Wilkin | 29.51% | 753 | 70.38% | 1,796 | 0.12% | 3 | -40.87% | -1,043 | 2,552 |
| Winona | 49.63% | 10,012 | 50.29% | 10,145 | 0.09% | 18 | -0.66% | -133 | 20,175 |
| Wright | 37.45% | 24,372 | 62.48% | 40,666 | 0.07% | 44 | -25.04% | -16,294 | 65,082 |
| Yellow Medicine | 34.67% | 1,504 | 65.33% | 2,834 | 0.00% | 0 | -30.66% | -1,330 | 4,338 |
| Totals | 54.53% | 1,345,685 | 45.38% | 1,119,949 | 0.08% | 2,095 | 9.15% | 225,736 | 2,467,729 |

Counties that flipped from Democratic to Republican

- Beltrami (largest city: Bemidji)
- Mahnomen (largest city: Mahnomen)
- Mower (largest city: Austin)
- Norman (largest city: Ada)
- Winona (largest city: Winona)

==== By congressional district ====
Simon and Crockett each won four of eight congressional districts.

| District | Simon | Crockett | Representative |
|---|---|---|---|
| 1st | 46% | 54% | Brad Finstad |
| 2nd | 55% | 45% | Angie Craig |
| 3rd | 61% | 39% | Dean Phillips |
| 4th | 70% | 30% | Betty McCollum |
| 5th | 83% | 17% | Ilhan Omar |
| 6th | 42% | 57% | Tom Emmer |
| 7th | 34% | 65% | Michelle Fischbach |
| 8th | 46% | 53% | Pete Stauber |

== See also ==
- 2022 Minnesota elections
