= Steve Simon =

American politician

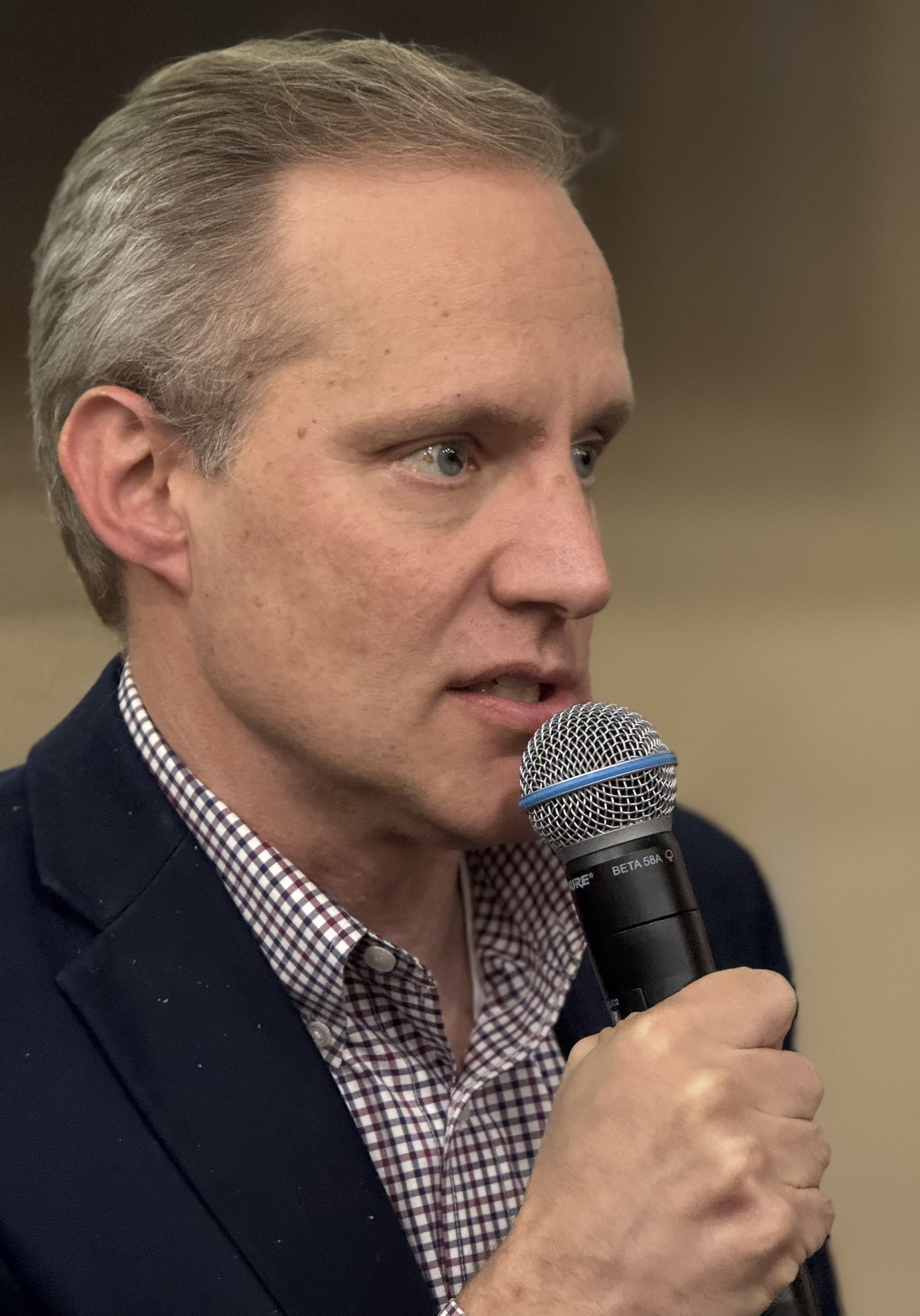
- Simon in 2026

22nd Secretary of State of Minnesota
- Incumbent
- Assumed office January 5, 2015
- Governor: Mark Dayton; Tim Walz; Amy Klobuchar (elect)
- Preceded by: Mark Ritchie

Member of the Minnesota House of Representatives
- In office January 4, 2005 – January 5, 2015
- Preceded by: Jim Rhodes
- Succeeded by: Cheryl Youakim
- Constituency: District 44A (2005–2013); District 46B (2013–2015)

Personal details
- Born: Stephen Frederick Simon; December 12, 1969 (age 56) Minneapolis, Minnesota, U.S.
- Party: Democratic
- Spouse: Leia Christoffer
- Children: 2
- Education: Tufts University (BA); University of Minnesota (JD)

Stephen Frederick Simon (born December 12, 1969) is an American politician from the state of Minnesota serving as the 22nd Minnesota Secretary of State. A member of the Minnesota Democratic–Farmer–Labor Party (DFL), he previously represented District 46B in the Minnesota House of Representatives.

== Early life, education, and career ==
Simon graduated from Hopkins High School in Minnetonka, then went on to Tufts University in Medford, Massachusetts, receiving his B.A. in Political Science in 1992. He earned his J.D. from the University of Minnesota Law School in 1996. He worked as an assistant attorney general for Minnesota attorneys general Hubert H. Humphrey III and Mike Hatch from 1996 to 2001, and was an associate with the law firm of Robins, Kaplan, Miller, and Ciresi from 2001 to 2014.

== Minnesota House of Representatives ==
Simon was first elected in 2004, and was re-elected in 2006, 2008, 2010, and 2012.

In the House, Simon served on the Elections Committee, serving his final term as chair in 2013-14. He authored the provision on no-excuse absentee voting in 2013.

On May 2, 2011, Simon testified about and opposed a proposed constitutional amendment to ban same-sex marriage in Minnesota, saying, "How many more gay people does God have to create before we ask ourselves whether or not God actually wants them around?" His comments drew national attention.

== Minnesota Secretary of State ==
=== Campaigns ===
On August 6, 2013, Simon announced his candidacy in the 2014 Minnesota Secretary of State election. He narrowly defeated Republican nominee Dan Severson. In 2018, Simon was reelected by a fairly large margin over Republican nominee John Howe. In 2022, he was reelected over Republican nominee Kim Crockett by an even larger margin. As of 2026, Simon has never lost an election.

On December 8, 2025, Simon announced he would seek a fourth term. He won his fourth term on November 3, 2026, defeating Republican nominee Tad Jude.

In 2026, Simon received the Joan Growe Award at the Humphrey-Mondale Awards.

== Personal life ==
Steve Simon is married to Leia Christoffer Simon, and they have two children together. Active in his local community, Simon is a member of the TwinWest Chamber of Commerce, the American Cancer Society, the local League of Women Voters, the St. Louis Park Community Education Advisory Council, and the Lenox Foundation, which raises funds for the St. Louis Park Senior Program. He is a member of Temple Israel, has served on the board of the Minnesota Chapter of the Jewish Community Relations Council, and is an attorney.

== Electoral history ==
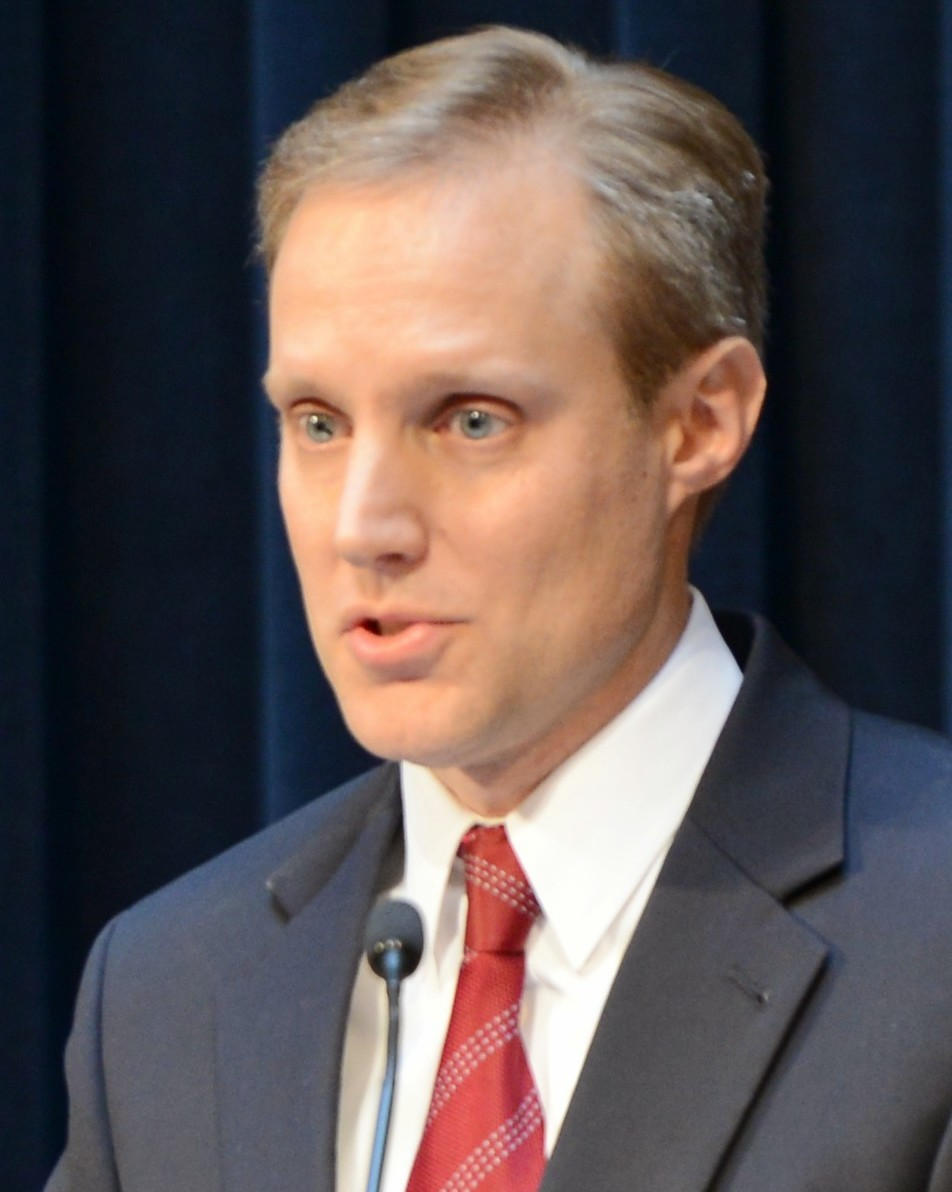
Simon in 2015

Minnesota House of Representatives District 44A Election, 2004
| Party | Candidate | Votes | % |
| DFL | Steve Simon | 11,643 | 55.55 |
| Republican | Jim Rhodes | 9,272 | 44.23 |
| Write-ins | Write-ins | 46 | 0.22 |

Minnesota House of Representatives District 44A Election, 2006
| Party | Candidate | Votes | % |
| DFL | Steve Simon (inc.) | 10,886 | 70.21 |
| Republican | Jason Van Buren | 4,590 | 29.60 |
| Write-ins | Write-ins | 29 | 0.19 |

Minnesota House of Representatives District 44A Election, 2008
| Party | Candidate | Votes | % |
| DFL | Steve Simon (inc.) | 14,394 | 68.54 |
| Republican | Tracy Leahy | 6,553 | 31.20 |
| Write-ins | Write-ins | 53 | 0.25 |

Minnesota House of Representatives District 44A Election, 2010
| Party | Candidate | Votes | % |
| DFL | Steve Simon (inc.) | 9,538 | 65.36 |
| Republican | Stephen Manderfeld | 5,031 | 34.48 |
| Write-ins | Write-ins | 24 | 0.16 |

Minnesota House of Representatives District 46B Election, 2012
| Party | Candidate | Votes | % |
| DFL | Steve Simon | 14,956 | 69.98 |
| Republican | David Arvidson | 6,372 | 29.81 |
| Write-ins | Write-ins | 45 | 0.21 |

Minnesota Secretary of State DFL Primary Election, 2014
| Party | Candidate | Votes | % |
|---|---|---|---|
| Democratic (DFL) | Steve Simon | 65,634 | 42.67 |
| Democratic (DFL) | Dick Franson | 44,700 | 29.06 |
| Democratic (DFL) | Gregg Iverson | 43,478 | 28.27 |
| Total votes | | 153,812 | 100 |

Minnesota Secretary of State election, 2014
| Party | Candidate | Votes | % | ±% |
|---|---|---|---|---|
| Democratic (DFL) | Steve Simon | 901,450 | 47.04% | −2.06% |
| Republican | Dan Severson | 879,022 | 45.87% | +0.23% |
| Independence | Bob Helland | 94,065 | 4.91% | −0.28% |
| Libertarian | Bob Odden | 40,729 | 2.13% | N/A |
| Write-in | | 1,134 | 0.06% | -0.01% |
| Total votes | | 1,916,400 | 100.0% | |
| Democratic (DFL) hold | | | | |

Minnesota Secretary of State election, 2018
| Party | Candidate | Votes | % | ±% |
|---|---|---|---|---|
| Democratic (DFL) | Steve Simon (incumbent) | 1,328,502 | 52.25% | +5.21% |
| Republican | John Howe | 1,109,093 | 43.62% | −2.25% |
| Independence | William Denney | 103,610 | 4.08% | −0.83% |
| Write-in | | 1,317 | 0.05% | -0.01% |
| Total votes | | 2,542,522 | 100.0% | N/A |
| Democratic (DFL) hold | | | | |

Minnesota Secretary of State DFL Primary Election, 2022
| Party | Candidate | Votes | % |
|---|---|---|---|
| Democratic (DFL) | Steve Simon (incumbent) | 285,314 | 72.51 |
| Democratic (DFL) | Steve Carlson | 108,144 | 27.49 |
| Total votes | | 393,458 | 100.00 |

2022 Minnesota Secretary of State election
| Party | Candidate | Votes | % | ±% |
|---|---|---|---|---|
| Democratic (DFL) | Steve Simon (incumbent) | 1,345,685 | 54.53% | +2.28% |
| Republican | Kim Crockett | 1,119,949 | 45.38% | +1.76% |
| Write-in | | 2,095 | 0.08% | +0.03% |
| Total votes | | 2,467,729 | 100.0% | |
| Democratic (DFL) hold | | | | |

Minnesota Secretary of State DFL Primary Election, 2026
| Party | Candidate | Votes | % |
|---|---|---|---|
| Democratic (DFL) | Steve Simon (incumbent) | 615,129 | 100.0 |
| Total votes | | 615,129 | 100.0 |

2026 Minnesota Secretary of State election
| Party | Candidate | Votes | % | ±% |
|---|---|---|---|---|
| Democratic (DFL) | Steve Simon (incumbent) | 1,529,231 | 54.71% | +0.18% |
| Republican | Tad Jude | 1,168,635 | 41.81% | −3.57% |
| Libertarian | George "Chip" Tangen | 54,684 | 1.96% | |
| Green | Seth Kuhl-Stennes | 41,368 | 1.48% | |
| Write-in | | 1,256 | 0.05% | −0.03% |
| Total votes | | 2,795,174 | 100.0 | |

Party political offices
| Preceded by Mark Ritchie | Democratic nominee for Secretary of State of Minnesota; 2014, 2018, 2022, 2026 | Most recent |
Political offices
| Preceded by Mark Ritchie | Secretary of State of Minnesota; 2015–present | Incumbent |
