= John Howe (Minnesota politician) =

American politician

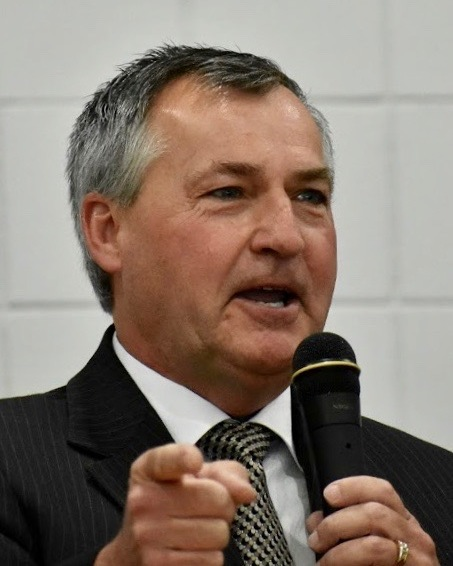

Member of the Minnesota Senate from the 28th district
- In office January 4, 2011 – January 7, 2013
- Preceded by: Steve Murphy
- Succeeded by: Matt Schmit (Redistricted)

Mayor of Red Wing
- In office 2008–2011
- Preceded by: Donna Dummer
- Succeeded by: Dennis Egan

Personal details
- Born: August 26, 1963 (age 62)
- Party: Republican
- Children: 3
- Education: St. Cloud State University (BA)

John Sterling Howe (born August 26, 1963) is an American politician and former Republican member of the Minnesota Senate who represented District 28, which included portions of Goodhue, Wabasha, and Winona counties in southeastern Minnesota.

== Early life, education, and career ==
Howe attended St. Cloud State University in St. Cloud, earning his B.A. in Criminal Justice. He has worked as a laborer, corrections officer and Sears store owner. Howe was a member of the Goodhue County Social Services Board, and was mayor of Red Wing from 2008 until becoming a senator in 2011. He also served on the Minnesota Clean Water Council, appointed by Minnesota Governor Tim Pawlenty. He is also the owner of Howe Properties, LLC, based in Red Wing.

== Political career ==
Howe was first elected to the Senate in 2010. He was a member of the Energy, Utilities and Telecommunications, the Jobs and Economic Growth, the Taxes, and the Transportation committees. His special legislative concerns were energy and the environment. Howe failed in his 2012 bid for re-election, losing to Red Wing DFLer Matt Schmit. Howe attributed his loss to fliers that featured a mug shot of his rival after being arrested on suspicion of drunken driving.

Howe unsuccessfully sought the Republican endorsement to be Minnesota Secretary of State in 2014. He ran again for Minnesota Secretary of State as the Republican nominee in 2018.

Party political offices
Preceded by Dan Severson	Republican nominee for Minnesota Secretary of State; 2018	Succeeded by Kim Crockett
