= 2010 Minnesota Secretary of State election =

- November 2, 2010
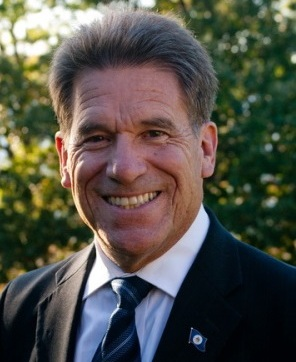

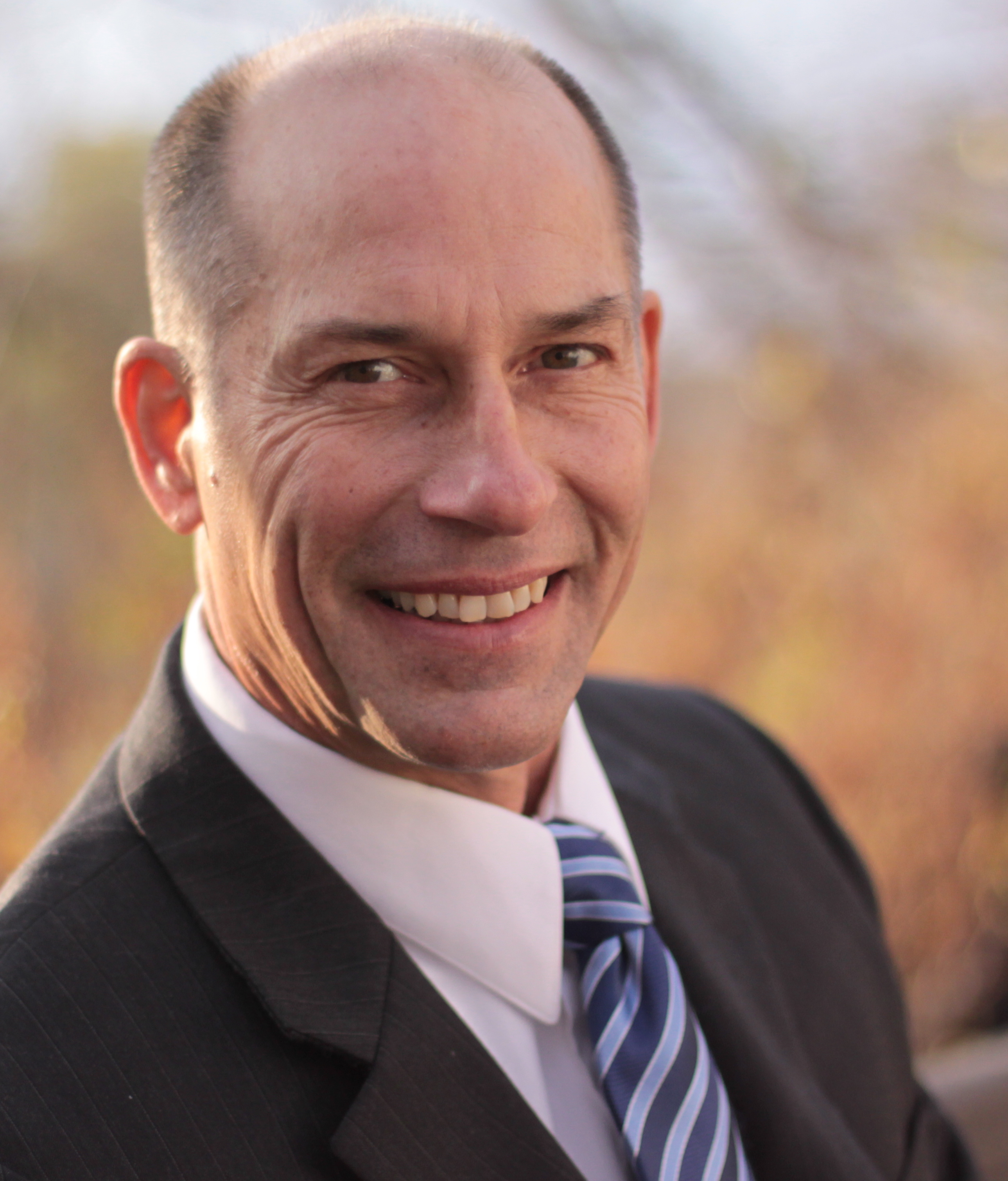

Nominee	Mark Ritchie	Dan Severson	Jual Carlson
Party	Democratic (DFL)	Republican	Independence
Popular vote	999,382	928,913	105,675
Percentage	49.1%	45.6%	5.19%
- Ritchie: 30–40% 40–50% 50–60% 60–70% 70–80% 80–90% >90% Severson: 30–40% 40–50% 50–60% 60–70% 70–80% 80–90% >90% Carlson: 50–60% Tie: 30–40% 40–50% 50% No votes
Secretary of State before election
Mark Ritchie
Democratic (DFL)
Elected Secretary of State
Mark Ritchie
Democratic (DFL)

The 2010 Minnesota secretary of state election was held on Tuesday, November 2, 2010 to elect the Minnesota secretary of state for a four-year term. Primary elections were held on August 10, 2010. Incumbent Mark Ritchie of the Minnesota Democratic–Farmer–Labor Party (DFL) won re-election to a second term.

== Candidates ==
=== Democratic–Farmer–Labor Party ===
Incumbent Mark Ritchie won endorsement at the Minnesota Democratic–Farmer–Labor Party (DFL) convention. He faced only token opposition in his party's primary from perennial candidate Dick Franson, and easily won his party's nomination in the August 10, 2010 primary.

=== Republican Party ===
State Representative Dan Severson received the endorsement of the Republican Party of Minnesota at its state convention and was unchallenged in his party primary.

=== Independence Party ===
Jual Carlson filed at the last minute as an Independence Party of Minnesota candidate. As the only Independence candidate, he faced no opposition in the Independence primary. Carlson had previously sought office as a Republican.

== Results ==
Candidate	Party	Votes	
Candidate	Party	#	%
Mark Ritchie	Democratic–Farmer–Labor	999,382	49.10
Dan Severson	Republican	928,913	45.64
Jual Carlson	Independence	105,675	5.19
Write-in	—	1,395	0.07
Total		2,035,365	100.00
Valid votes		2,035,365	95.86
Blank votes		88,004	4.14
Turnout		2,123,369	55.81
Eligible voters		3,804,746	

Source: Minnesota Secretary of State
