= Dan Severson =

American politician (born 1954)

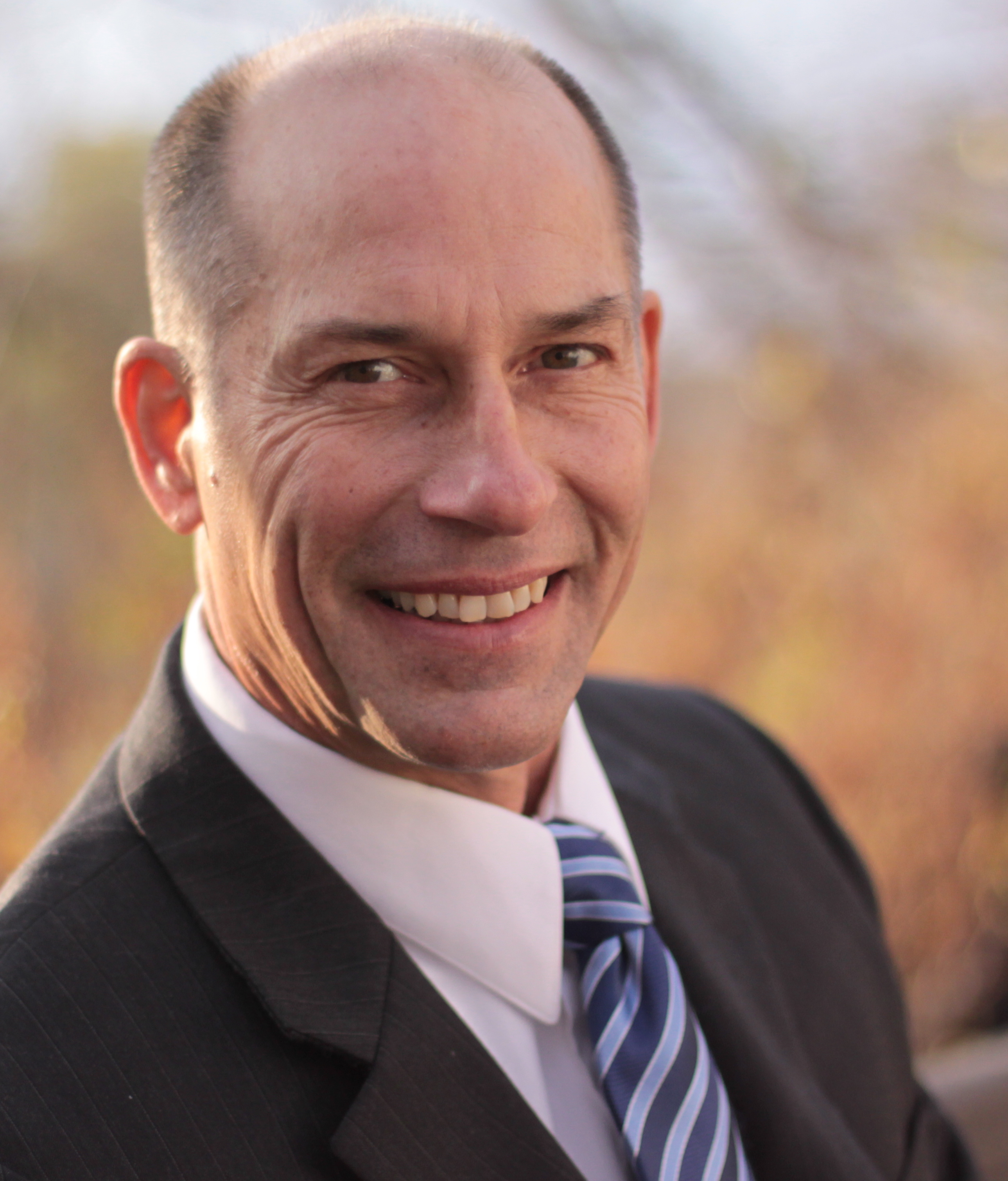

Member of the Minnesota House of Representatives from the 14A district
- In office January 7, 2003 – January 3, 2011
- Preceded by: Steve Dehler
- Succeeded by: Tim O'Driscoll

Personal details
- Born: Daniel Mark Severson; August 31, 1954 (age 72) Mora, Minnesota, U.S.
- Party: Republican
- Spouse: Cathy Jo
- Education: St. Cloud State University
- Profession: Business owner Fighter pilot Politician; Veteran

Military service
- Allegiance: U.S.
- Branch/service: United States Navy
- Years of service: 1978–2000
- Rank: Commander

Daniel Mark Severson (born August 31, 1954) is a former member of the Minnesota House of Representatives who represented District 14A, which includes portions of Benton and Stearns counties in the north central part of the state. He is a retired U.S. Navy fighter pilot, business owner, and substitute teacher.

== Early life, education, and military service ==
Severson graduated from St. Cloud State University in St. Cloud in 1979 with a B.A. in Physics. He was a Navy fighter pilot, officer and commander from 1978 to 2000.

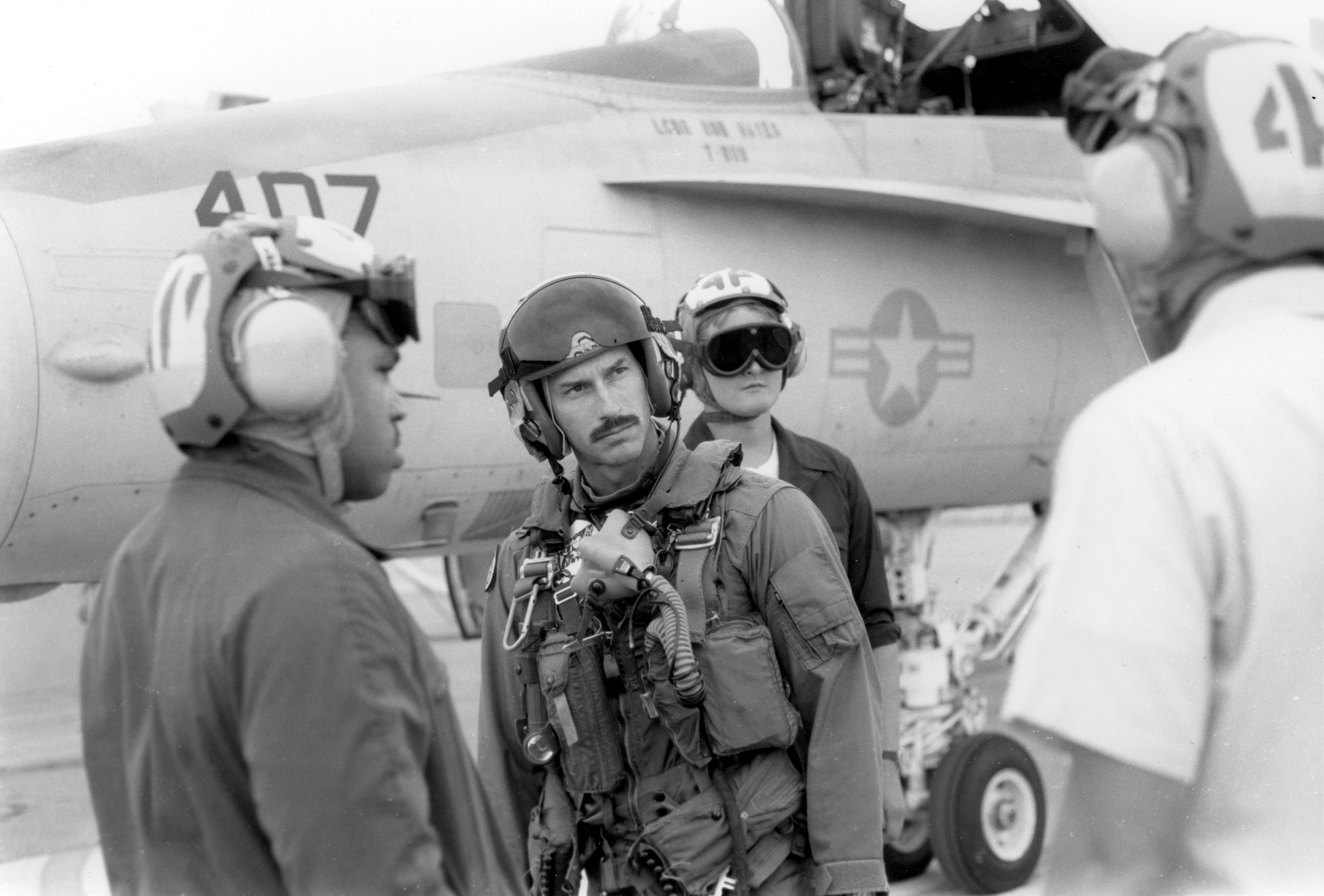
Dan "Doc" Severson with crew and FA18 Hornet

Severson enlisted in the Navy in 1978 at the age of 21. Severson was in the Navy for 22 years, most of those years as a Strike-Fighter Pilot.

== Minnesota House of Representatives ==
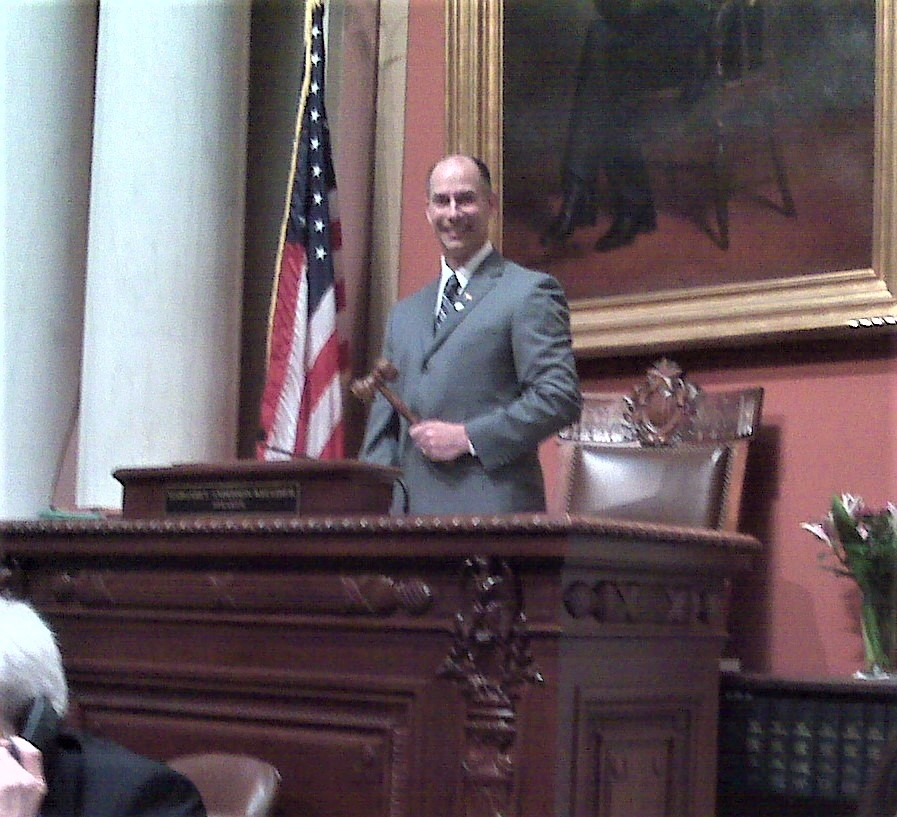
Rep. Dan Severson serving as Minority Whip

=== Elections ===
In 2002, after redistricting, Severson ran for the newly redrawn Minnesota House District 14A and won defeating DFL nominee Dennis Molitor 49%-47%. In 2004, he won re-election to a second term with 62% of the vote. In 2006, he won re-election to a third term with 54% of the vote. In 2008, he won re-election to a fourth term with 55% of the vote.

=== Tenure ===
He was House Republican Minority Whip. He co-sponsored a bill that would eliminate second-hand smoke in bars and restaurants. In 2008, he supported Republican governor Tim Pawlenty when he vetoed a $3.2 billion budget increase paid for by higher taxes. In 2009, he introduced an amendment to the Minnesota State Constitution to prohibit marriage or civil unions between same-sex couples.

=== Committee assignments ===
Severson was a member of the House Agriculture, Rural Economies and Veterans Affairs Subcommittee for the Veterans Affairs Division, and the Finance subcommittees for the Housing Finance and Policy and Public Health Finance Division, the Public Safety Finance Division, and the Transportation Finance and Policy Division.

== 2010 Secretary of State campaign ==
In October 2009, Severson announced that he had filed the paperwork to run for Minnesota Secretary of State, seeking the Republican Party's endorsement for his candidacy at their 2010 state convention. He received the party's endorsement on April 29, 2010, and challenged incumbent secretary of state Mark Ritchie in the November 2010 general election.

In his filing for secretary of state, Severson sought to be listed using his Navy pilot call name Doc Severson, some thought it to be an allusion to former Tonight Show band leader Doc Severinsen. Severson was challenged because he had not previously appeared on the ballot with the nickname "Doc." Severson stated the nickname had been given to him as he went through flight training and followed him through his 22 year career.

Severson ran for secretary of state on the contention that there was widespread fraud in the recount of the 2008 Senate election and a requirement that voters show a Photo ID to vote. Incumbent Democratic secretary of state Mark Ritchie won re-election and defeated Severson 49%-46%.

== 2012 U.S. Senate campaign ==
On May 16, 2011, Severson announced that he would seek the Republican party's endorsement for the U.S. Senate seat held by Democrat Amy Klobuchar. However, he lost the endorsement at the party convention and withdrew in favor of State Representative Kurt Bills. Klobuchar was re-elected in a landslide, winning all but two counties.

== 2014 Secretary of State campaign ==
Severson ran for secretary of state again in 2014. After winning the party endorsement ahead of former state senator John Howe, Severson was unopposed in the primary election. He lost the general election to Democratic state representative Steve Simon by 901,450 votes (47.04%) to 879,022 (45.87%).

== 2020 U.S. House of Representatives campaign ==
Severson moved to Florida in 2015. In October, 2019 Congressman Francis Rooney announced his retirement from congress, Severson declared his candidacy for the United States House of Representatives for Florida's 19th congressional district in the 2020 elections. During his campaign, Severson made a tweet including the hashtag "#WWG1WGA", a slogan used by followers of the QAnon conspiracy theory. He came in seventh place in the GOP primary, with just 3.1% of the vote.

== 2022 Lee County School District campaign ==
After losing the U.S. House of Representatives race, Dan also ran for but lost in a more modest local school board election

Party political offices
Preceded by Mary Kiffmeyer	Republican nominee for Minnesota Secretary of State; 2010, 2014	Succeeded by John Howe
