= 2018 Minnesota Attorney General election =

- November 6, 2018
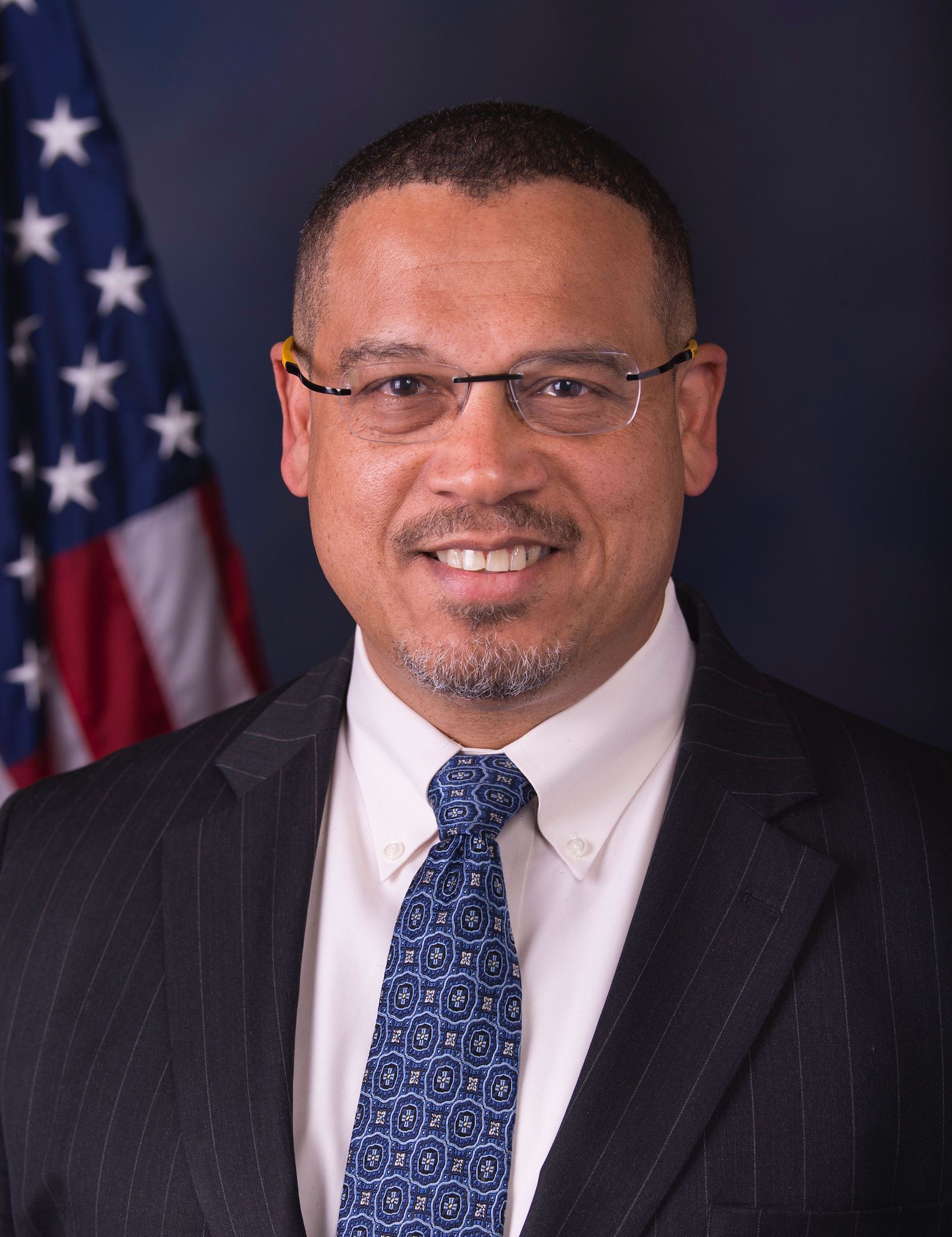

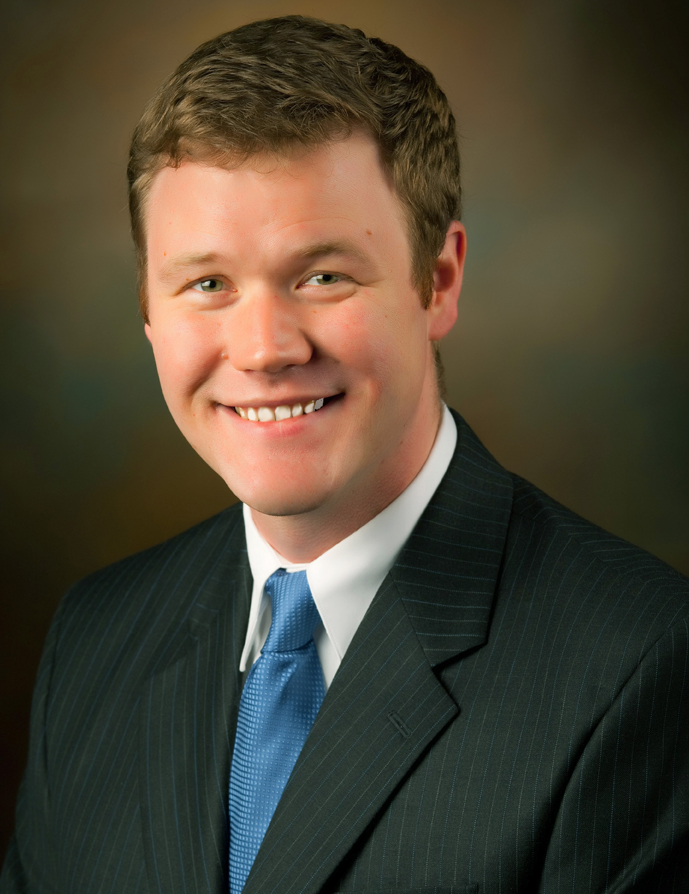

Nominee	Keith Ellison	Doug Wardlow	Noah Johnson
Party	Democratic (DFL)	Republican	Grassroots—LC
Popular vote	1,249,407	1,150,459	145,748
Percentage	48.96%	45.08%	5.71%
- Ellison: 40–50% 50–60% 60–70% 70–80% 80–90% >90% Wardlow: 40–50% 50–60% 60–70% 70–80% 80–90% >90% Tie: No votes
Attorney General before election
Lori Swanson
Democratic (DFL)
Elected Attorney General
Keith Ellison
Democratic (DFL)

The 2018 Minnesota Attorney General election was held on November 6, 2018, to elect the attorney general of the U.S. state of Minnesota. A primary election was held on August 14, 2018, in which Doug Wardlow was nominated as the Republican candidate and Keith Ellison was nominated as the Democratic–Farmer–Labor (DFL) candidate. Ellison won the election, albeit with the narrowest margin of victory for the DFL since 1998.

== Background ==
DFL incumbent Lori Swanson was first elected attorney general in 2006. Swanson succeeded two-term DFL incumbent Mike Hatch, who opted to run for governor in 2006. Swanson was re-elected in 2010 and 2014. On January 28, 2018, Swanson announced that she would seek re-election. The announcement came after months of speculation that she would run for governor in 2018. On June 4, 2018, after failing to receive her own party's endorsement for attorney general, Swanson ended her campaign for attorney general and opted to run for governor instead.

== Democratic–Farmer–Labor primary ==
=== Candidates ===
- Keith Ellison, Deputy Chair of the Democratic National Committee since 2017; U.S. Representative for Minnesota's 5th congressional district since 2007
- Tom Foley, former Ramsey County attorney
- Debra Hilstrom, member of the Minnesota House of Representatives since 2001; former Anoka County assistant attorney
  - Initially withdrew in January 2018 following Swanson's announcement that she would seek re-election. Re-entered the race following Swanson's withdrawal.
- Matt Pelikan, attorney; activist; former clerk for Minnesota Supreme Court Justices Paul Anderson and David Lillehaug
- Mike Rothman, commissioner of the Minnesota Department of Commerce from 2011 to 2017
  - Initially withdrew on February 16, 2018, following Swanson's announcement that she would seek re-election. Re-entered the race following Swanson's withdrawal.

It was reported in late January 2018 that Ellison was exploring the possibility of seeking election to be attorney general. According to several people he had spoken with recently, Ellison was not likely to run but found it enticing. Following Swanson's withdrawal from the election on June 4, 2018, it was reported that Ellison was likely to enter the race, which he did the next day.

On June 2, 2018, the DFL endorsed Pelikan at their state convention. Swanson received 52 percent over Pelikan after the first round of balloting, but not the required 60 percent. Swanson then withdrew her nomination for the party's endorsement, but did not indicate if she would run in the primary election.

On June 4, 2018, Swanson announced she would no longer seek re-election and would instead run for Governor. The day after her announcement, Ellison, Foley, Hatch, Hilstrom, and Rothman entered the race. Hatch said he did not think Pelikan had sufficient courtroom experience and would withdraw if someone he thought was qualified entered the race, which he did the next day.

==== Withdrawn ====
- Sam Clark, former Saint Paul city attorney; former state director and counsel for U.S. Senator Amy Klobuchar
  - Withdrew on January 31, 2018, following Swanson's announcement that she would seek re-election.
- Mike Hatch, attorney general from 1999 to 2007
  - Withdrew on June 6, 2018.
- John Lesch, member of the Minnesota House of Representatives since 2003; Saint Paul assistant city attorney
  - Withdrew on September 15, 2017, saying he wanted to spend more time with his infant daughter, to help the DFL win control of the Minnesota of House of Representatives, and cited the uncertainty of whether DFL incumbent Lori Swanson would seek re-election.
- Lori Swanson, incumbent since 2007
  - Withdrew on June 4, 2018, to seek election to be governor.
- Ryan Winkler, general counsel for Biothera; member of the Minnesota House of Representatives from 2007 to 2015
  - Withdrew in January 2018 following Swanson's announcement that she would seek re-election.

=== Results ===
Results by county Map legend: Ellison—60–70%; Ellison—50–60%; Ellison—40–50%; Ellison—30–40%; Ellison—<30%; Hilstrom—30–40%

Results by congressional district Map legend: Ellison—60–70%; Ellison—50–60%

Democratic primary election results
Party	Candidate	Votes	%
Democratic (DFL)	Keith Ellison	281,142	49.8
Democratic (DFL)	Debra Hilstrom	108,048	19.2
Democratic (DFL)	Tom Foley	70,786	12.5
Democratic (DFL)	Matt Pelikan	59,876	10.6
Democratic (DFL)	Mike Rothman	44,522	7.9
Total votes		564,374	100.0

== Republican primary ==
=== Candidates ===
- Sharon Anderson, perennial candidate and nominee for attorney general in 1994
- Bob Lessard, DFL member of the Minnesota Senate from 1977 to 2003
- Doug Wardlow, attorney for the Alliance Defending Freedom; member of the Minnesota House of Representatives from 2011 to 2013

Wardlow was endorsed by the Republicans on June 2, 2018, at their state convention.

==== Withdrawn ====
- Harry Niska, attorney; candidate for the Ramsey City Council in 2010
  - Withdrew on November 5, 2017, saying campaigning required too much personal life sacrifice.

=== Results ===
Results by county Map legend: Wardlow—50–60%; Wardlow—40–50%; Wardlow—30–40%; Anderson—30–40%; Anderson—40–50%; Lessard—30–40%; Lessard—40–50%

Results by congressional district Map legend: Wardlow—50–60%; Wardlow—40–50%; Wardlow—30–40%

Republican primary election results
Party	Candidate	Votes	%
Republican	Doug Wardlow	135,971	46.3
Republican	Sharon Anderson	94,245	32.0
Republican	Bob Lessard	63,722	21.7
Total votes		293,398	100.0

== Minor parties and independents ==
=== Candidates ===
- Noah Johnson (Grassroots–Legalize Cannabis Party), attorney

On October 15, 2018, Grassroots–Legalize Cannabis Party candidate Noah Johnson announced his endorsement of DFL nominee Keith Ellison. In explaining his endorsement, Johnson cited Ellison's recent statement of support for marijuana legalization. Johnson also stated that he wished to avoid drawing votes away from Ellison and thereby increasing Republican nominee Doug Wardlow's chances of victory. Johnson's name remained on the ballot.

== General election ==
On October 27, 2018, Politico reported that the State of Minnesota had not elected a Republican attorney general in more than 40 years, but added that Ellison was "putting that streak to the test." According to Politico, Ellison had been "rocked by accusations of domestic abuse" and had fallen behind Wardlow in a recent poll; Politico added that the race "revolves around Ellison and what voters make of the misconduct allegations he's facing."

=== Predictions ===
Source	Ranking	As of
Governing	Tossup	October 26, 2018

=== Endorsements ===
Keith Ellison (DFL)

Organizations

- CWA Minnesota State Council
- Democracy for America
- LIUNA Minnesota & North Dakota
- MoveOn
- NARAL Pro-Choice Minnesota
- Our Revolution MN
- TakeAction Minnesota
- Teamsters Local 120
- UFCW Local 1189
- West Area Labor Council / BTCGM

National figures

- Walter Mondale, former vice president of the United States and Democratic nominee for president in 1984
- Bernie Sanders, U.S. senator (I-VT) and 2016 presidential candidate

State senators

- Melisa Franzen
- Jeff Hayden
- Jason Isaacson
- Carolyn Laine
- Sandy Pappas, Senate president 2013–2017
- Melissa Wiklund

State representatives

- Susan Allen
- David Bly
- Karen Clark
- Jim Davnie
- Raymond Dehn
- Betty Folliard, former
- Mike Freiberg
- Alice Hausman
- Sheldon Johnson
- Erin Koegel
- Mary Kunesh-Podein
- Fue Lee
- John Lesch
- Carlos Mariani
- Rena Moran
- Ryan Winkler, former and candidate
- Cheryl Youakim

County commissioners

- Patrick Boyle, St. Louis
- Debbie Goettell, Hennepin
- Linda Higgins, Hennepin
- Frank Jewell, St. Louis
- Mary Jo McGuire, Ramsey

Mayors

- Myron Bailey, Cottage Grove
- Melvin Carter, St. Paul
- Jacob Frey, Minneapolis
- Shep Harris, Golden Valley
- Jim Hovland, Edina
- Ted Kozlowski, Stillwater
- Dan Lund, Newport

City councilors

- Lisa Bender, Minneapolis
- Tim Brausen, St. Louis Park
- Amy Bredmoen, St. Paul
- Marquita Butler, Brooklyn Center
- Alondra Cano, Minneapolis
- Joanie Clausen, Golden Valley
- Phillipe Cunningham, Minneapolis
- Jeremiah Ellison, Minneapolis
- Steve Fletcher, Minneapolis
- Jason Gad, Hopkins
- Edwin Garcia, Richfield
- Maria Regan Gonzales, Richfield
- Lisa Goodman, Minneapolis
- Andrea Jenkins, Minneapolis
- Anne Mavity, St. Louis Park
- Linea Palmisano, Minneapolis
- Steve Schmidgall, Golden Valley
- Jeremy Schroeder, Minneapolis
- Simon Trautman, Richfield
- Abdi Warsame, Minneapolis

Others

- Rachel Bohman, Rochester township board member
- Steve Marchese, St. Paul school board member
Doug Wardlow (R)

U.S. executive branch officials

- Donald Trump, 45th president of the United States

U.S. representatives

- Tom Emmer (MN-06)
- Jason Lewis (MN-02)

Organizations

- Minnesota Gun Owners PAC
- Minnesota State Cattlemen's Association PAC
- National Federation of Independent Business
- Police Officers Federation of Minneapolis

Newspapers

- Duluth News Tribune
Declined to endorse

Newspapers

- Star Tribune

=== Debate ===
2018 Minnesota Attorney General election debate
No.	Date	Host	Moderator	Link	Democratic	Republican	Grassroots–Legalize Cannabis
Key: P Participant A Absent N Not invited I Invited W Withdrawn							
Key: P Participant A Absent N Not invited I Invited W Withdrawn					Keith Ellison	Doug Wardlow	Noah Johnson
1	Sep. 21, 2018	Twin Cities PBS	Eric Eskola; Cathy Wurzer	Twin Cities PBS	P	P	P

=== Polling ===
Poll source	Date(s) administered	Sample size	Margin of error	Keith Ellison (DFL)	Doug Wardlow (R)	Other	Undecided
SurveyUSA	October 29–31, 2018	600	±5.3%	44%	40%	4%	12%
Mason-Dixon	October 15–17, 2018	800	±3.5%	36%	43%	5%	16%
Mason-Dixon	September 10–12, 2018	800	±3.5%	41%	36%	5%	18%
SurveyUSA	September 6–8, 2018	574	±4.9%	41%	41%	4%	14%

=== Results ===
County results for Noah Johnson: Map legend: 8%; 7%; 6%; 5%; 4%; 3%

2018 Minnesota Attorney General election
Party	Candidate	Votes	%	±%
Democratic (DFL)	Keith Ellison	1,249,407	48.96%	−3.64
Republican	Doug Wardlow	1,150,459	45.08%	+6.07
Grassroots—LC	Noah Johnson (withdrawn)	145,748	5.71%	N/A
Write-in		6,158	0.24%	+0.20
Total votes		2,551,772	100.00%	N/A
Democratic (DFL) hold				

==== By congressional district ====
Despite losing the state, Wardlow won five of eight congressional districts, including two that elected Democrats.

District	Ellison	Wardlow	Representative
1st	42%	52%	Jim Hagedorn
2nd	46%	48%	Angie Craig
3rd	50%	45%	Dean Phillips
4th	61%	33%	Betty McCollum
5th	74%	20%	Ilhan Omar
6th	36%	58%	Tom Emmer
7th	36%	59%	Collin Peterson
8th	43%	51%	Pete Stauber

== See also ==
- 2018 Minnesota elections
