= 2018 Minnesota gubernatorial election =

- November 6, 2018
- Turnout: 2,587,287 (63.6%) (Note: Based on an estimated number of 4,064,389 eligible voters)
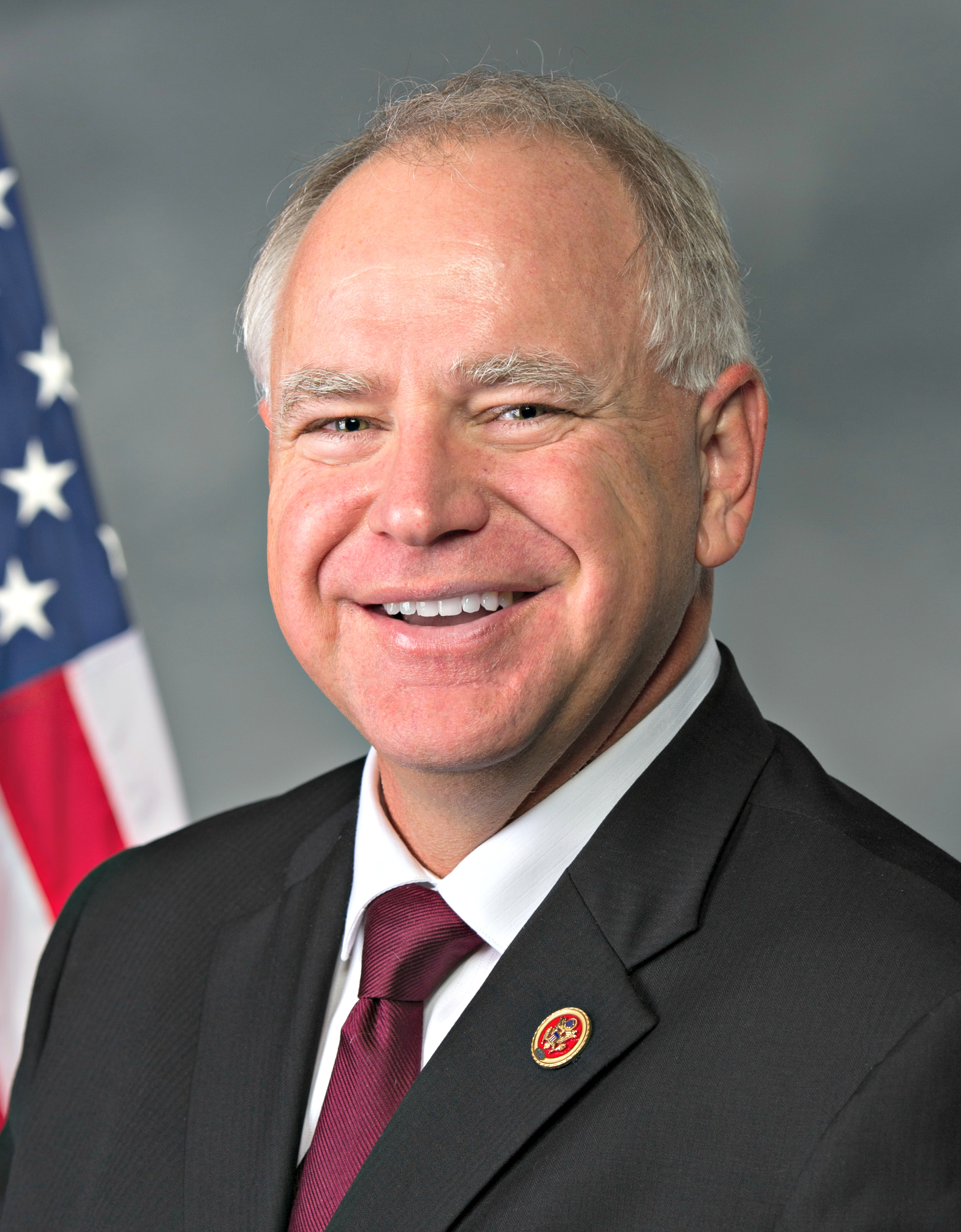

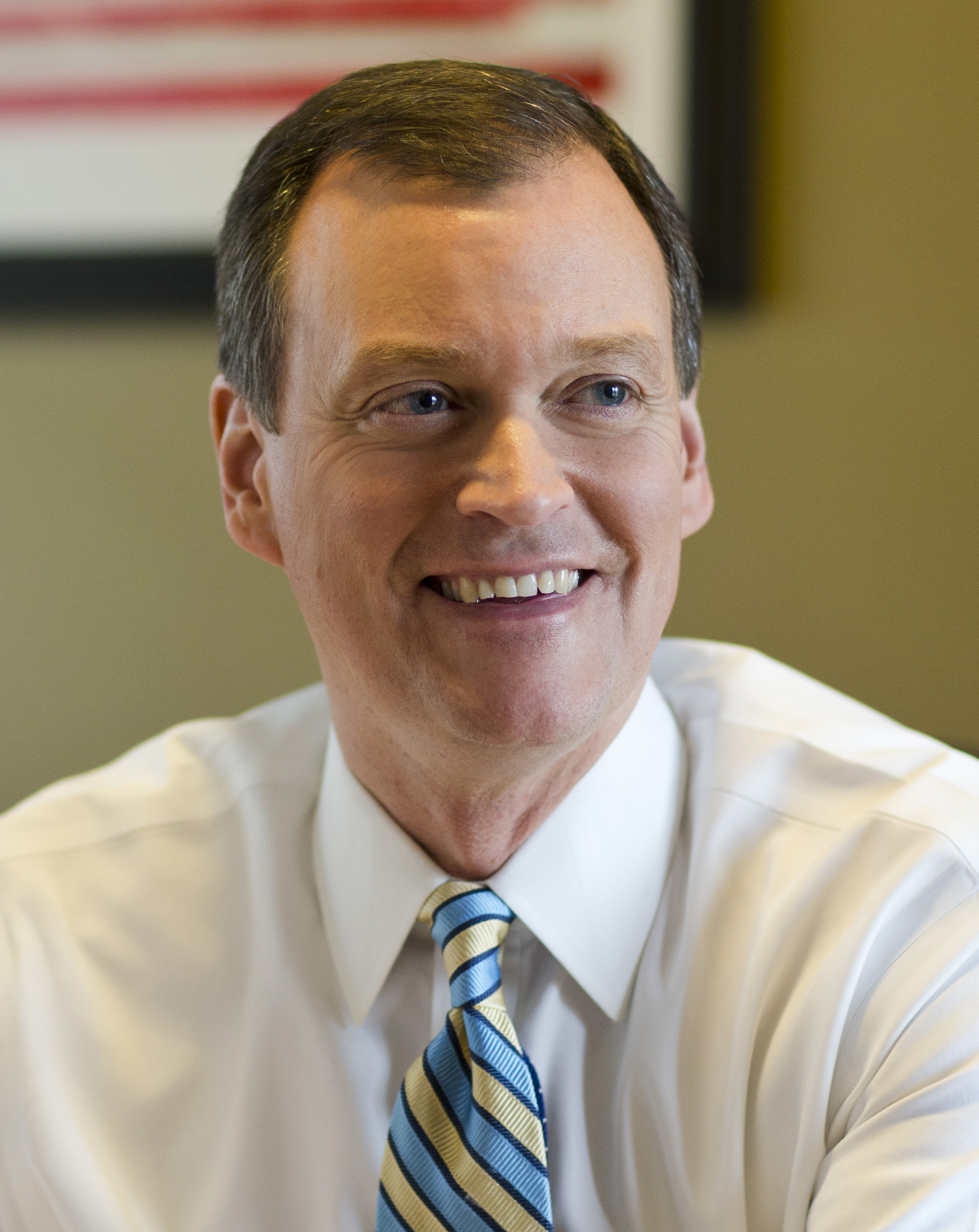
Nominee	Tim Walz	Jeff Johnson
Party	Democratic (DFL)	Republican
Running mate	Peggy Flanagan	Donna Bergstrom
Popular vote	1,393,096	1,097,705
Percentage	53.84%	42.43%
- Walz: 40–50% 50–60% 60–70% 70–80% 80–90% >90% Johnson: 30–40% 40–50% 50–60% 60–70% 70–80% 80–90% >90% Tie: 40–50% 50% No votes
Governor before election
Mark Dayton
Democratic (DFL)
Elected Governor
Tim Walz
Democratic (DFL)

The 2018 Minnesota gubernatorial election took place on November 6, to elect the 41st governor of Minnesota, as incumbent Democratic (DFL) Governor Mark Dayton chose not to run for re-election for a third term. The Democratic nominee was U.S. Representative Tim Walz from Minnesota's 1st congressional district, while the Republican Party nominated Hennepin County commissioner Jeff Johnson for a second consecutive time. The Independence Party of Minnesota did not field a candidate for the first time since 1994. Going into the election, polls showed Walz ahead; the race was characterized as lean or likely DFL.

Walz went on to defeat Johnson by the largest margin for a DFL candidate since 1986, receiving more votes than any other gubernatorial candidate in Minnesota history. This was the first Minnesota gubernatorial election since 1958 in which any party won more than two consecutive elections, as well as the first time since 1998 that the party of the incumbent president lost.

Republicans carried Traverse County for the first time since 1998, and Chippewa, Swift, Big Stone, Itasca, Kittson, Lac qui Parle, Red Lake, and Marshall counties since 1994. Meanwhile, Democrats carried Olmsted County for the first time since 1974, and Dakota and Washington counties since 1986.

== Democratic–Farmer–Labor primary ==
=== Candidates ===
==== Nominated ====
- Tim Walz, U.S. representative from Minnesota's 1st congressional district
  - Running mate: Peggy Flanagan, state representative

==== Eliminated in primary ====
- Tim Holden, real estate investor and candidate for mayor of Saint Paul in 2017
  - Running mate: James P. Mellin II
- Erin Murphy, state representative
  - Running mate: Erin Maye Quade, state representative
- Olé Savior, perennial candidate
  - Running mate: Chris Edman
- Lori Swanson, attorney general of Minnesota
  - Running mate: Rick Nolan, U.S. representative

==== Withdrawn ====
- Chris Coleman, former mayor of Saint Paul
- Tina Liebling, state representative
- Rebecca Otto, Minnesota state auditor
  - Running mate: Zarina Baber, IT professional
- Paul Thissen, state representative, former House minority leader, and former speaker of the House

==== Declined ====
- Tom Bakk, minority leader of the Minnesota Senate and candidate for governor in 2010
- Mark Dayton, incumbent governor and former U.S. senator
- Debra Hilstrom, state representative and candidate for secretary of state in 2014 (ran for attorney general)
- Amy Klobuchar, U.S. senator (ran for re-election)
- Rick Nolan, U.S. representative from Minnesota's 8th congressional district (ran for lieutenant governor)
- R. T. Rybak, former vice chair of the Democratic National Committee, former mayor of Minneapolis and candidate for governor in 2010
- Tina Smith, U.S. senator (ran for U.S. Senate)

=== Endorsements ===
Erin Murphy (DFL)

Organizations

- Minnesota Democratic–Farmer–Labor Party

Labor unions

- AFSCME Council 5
- IATSE Local 13
- Minnesota Nurses Association
- SEIU Minnesota State Council

State elected officials

- Susan Allen, state representative
- David Bly, state representative
- Lyndon Carlson, state representative
- Karen Clark, state representative
- Mark Dayton, governor of Minnesota
- Raymond Dehn, state representative
- Chris Eaton, state senator
- Melisa Franzen, state senator
- Mike Freiberg, state representative
- Joan Growe, former Minnesota secretary of state
- Frank Hornstein, state representative
- Matt Klein, state senator
- Erin Koegel, state representative
- Mary Kunesh-Podein, state representative
- Carolyn Laine, state senator
- Diane Loeffler, state representative
- Becky Lourey, former state senator
- Tim Mahoney, state representative
- Carlos Mariani, state representative
- John Marty, state senator
- Sandra Masin, state representative
- Rena Moran, state representative
- Liz Olson, state representative
- Ilhan Omar, state representative
- Sandy Pappas, state senator
- Erin Maye Quade, state representative
- Ann Rest, state senator
- Mary Sawatzky, former state representative
- Jennifer Schultz, state representative
- ~~Erik Simonson, state senator~~
- Linda Slocum, state representative
- Yvonne Prettner Solon, former Minnesota lieutenant governor and former state senator
- JoAnn Ward, state representative

Local officials

- Lisa Bender, Minneapolis City Council president
- Alondra Cano, Minneapolis City Council
- Melvin Carter, mayor of Saint Paul
- John Choi, Ramsey County attorney
- Phillipe Cunningham, Minneapolis City Council
- Jeremiah Ellison, Minneapolis City Council
- Andrea Jenkins, Minneapolis City Council
- Emily Larson, mayor of Duluth
- Mary Jo McGuire, Ramsey County commissioner
- Gene Short, Currie City Council

National organizations

- Color of Change PAC
- CPD Action
- EMILY's List
- LGBTQ Victory Fund
- NARAL Pro-Choice America
- National Nurses United
- Our Revolution
Rebecca Otto (DFL)

State officials

- Tina Liebling, state representative, former 2018 gubernatorial candidate

Individuals

- Khizr Khan, Gold Star father
Lori Swanson (DFL)

Federal politicians

- Rick Nolan, U.S. representative and candidate for lieutenant governor on the same ticket

State elected officials

- Tom Bakk, state senator and minority leader
- David Tomassoni, state senator

Newspapers

- International Falls Journal (primary)
- Mesabi Daily News (primary)

Unions

- Teamsters, Local 120
Tim Walz (DFL)

Federal politicians

- Max Cleland, former U.S. senator
- Barney Frank, former U.S. representative
- Betty McCollum, U.S. representative
- Denis McDonough, former chief of staff to President Barack Obama
- Walter Mondale, former vice president, nominee for president in 1984, and former U.S. senator
- Collin Peterson, U.S. representative

Mayors

- Ardell Brede, mayor of Rochester
- Jacob Frey, mayor of Minneapolis
- R. T. Rybak, former mayor of Minneapolis
- Nora Slawik, mayor of Maplewood
- Elwin Tinklenberg, former mayor of Blaine

State elected officials

- Jamie Becker-Finn, state representative
- Karla Bigham, state senator
- Terri Bonoff, former state senator
- Robin Brown, former state representative
- Jim Carlson, state senator
- Greg Clausen, state senator
- Dick Cohen, state senator
- Jack Considine, state representative
- Kevin Dahle, former state senator
- John Dorn, former state representative
- Rob Ecklund, state representative
- Nick Frentz, state senator
- Patti Fritz, former state representative
- Foung Hawj, state senator
- Jeff Hayden, state senator
- Jason Isaacson, state senator
- Alice Johnson, former state senator
- Clark Johnson, state representative
- Ruth Johnson, former state representative
- Steve Kelley, former state senator
- Susan Kent, state senator
- Ron Latz, state senator
- Fue Lee, state representative
- Leon Lillie, state representative
- Matt Little, state senator
- Tony Lourey, state senator
- Paul Marquart, state representative
- John Persell, former state representative
- Jeanne Poppe, state representative
- Roger Reinert, former state senator
- Mark Ritchie, former Minnesota secretary of state
- Sharon Ropes, former state senator
- Don Samuelson, former state senator
- Duane Sauke, state representative
- Tom Saxhaug, former state senator
- Matt Schmit, former state senator
- Yvonne Selcer, former state representative
- Kathy Sheran, former state senator
- Erik Simonson, state senator
- Rod Skoe, former state senator
- Loren Solberg, former state representative
- Dan Sparks, state senator
- Mike Sundin, state representative
- Ted Suss, former state representative
- Chuck Wiger, state senator
- Cheryl Youakim, state representative

Individuals

- Wesley Clark, retired general, former Supreme Allied Commander of NATO, candidate for president of the United States in 2004
- Judy Shepard, board president of Matthew Shepard Foundation, LGBT-rights activist

Tribal nations

- Mille Lacs Band of Ojibwe

Newspapers

- Duluth News Tribune (DFL primary)
- Minneapolis Star Tribune (DFL primary)

Labor unions

- American Federation of Government Employees
- Brotherhood of Maintenance of Way Employes
- Education Minnesota
- IBEW – International Brotherhood of Electrical Engineers – Minnesota State Council
- International Union of Operating Engineers
- Ironworkers Local 512 – International Association of Bridge, Structural, Ornamental and Reinforcing Iron Workers
- IUPAT Local 82 – International Union of Painters and Allied Trades
- Laborers' International Union of North America
- MAPE – Minnesota Association of Professional Employees
- Minneapolis Firefighters Local 82 – International Association of Fire Fighters
- Minnesota Professional Firefighters – International Association of Fire Fighters
- Minnesota State Building & Construction Trades Council
- Minnesota State Council of Machinists – International Association of Machinists and Aerospace Workers
- Roofers, Waterproofers & Allied Trades Local 96 – United Union of Roofers, Waterproofers and Allied Workers
- SMART Sheet Metal Workers Local 10 – Sheet Metal Workers' International Association
- SMART Transportation Division, UTU – United Transportation Union
- Teamsters Joint Council 32
- UFCW Local 1189 – United Food and Commercial Workers
- United Brotherhood of Carpenters and Joiners of America
- United Steelworkers

Organizations

- VoteVets.org

=== Polling ===
Poll source	Date(s) administered	Sample size	Margin of error	Erin Murphy	Lori Swanson	Tim Walz	Other	Undecided
Emerson College	August 8–11, 2018	217	± 6.9%	19%	29%	28%	–	24%
Marist College	July 15–19, 2018	439	± 5.6%	11%	28%	24%	1%	37%
GQR Research (D-Minnesota Victory PAC)	June 25–27, 2018	602	–	17%	37%	29%	1%	16%

Hypothetical polling

Poll source	Date(s) administered	Sample size	Margin of error	Tom Bakk	Chris Coleman	Amy Klobuchar	Erin Murphy	Rebecca Otto	R. T. Rybak	Tina Smith	Lori Swanson	Tim Walz	Undecided
SurveyUSA	November 17–19, 2016	–	–	1%	3%	25%	0%	1%	6%	1%	3%	5%	54%

Poll source	Date(s) administered	Sample size	Margin of error	Chris Coleman	Tina Liebling	Erin Murphy	Rebecca Otto	Lori Swanson	Paul Thissen	Tim Walz	Undecided
Mason-Dixon	January 8–10, 2018	298	–	12%	2%	6%	9%	16%	4%	21%	30%

Poll source	Date(s) administered	Sample size	Margin of error	Erin Murphy	Rebecca Otto	Tim Walz	Other	Undecided
Expedition Strategies (D-Walz)	April 23–26, 2018	600	± 4.0%	3%	19%	27%	2%	49%

=== Straw poll ===
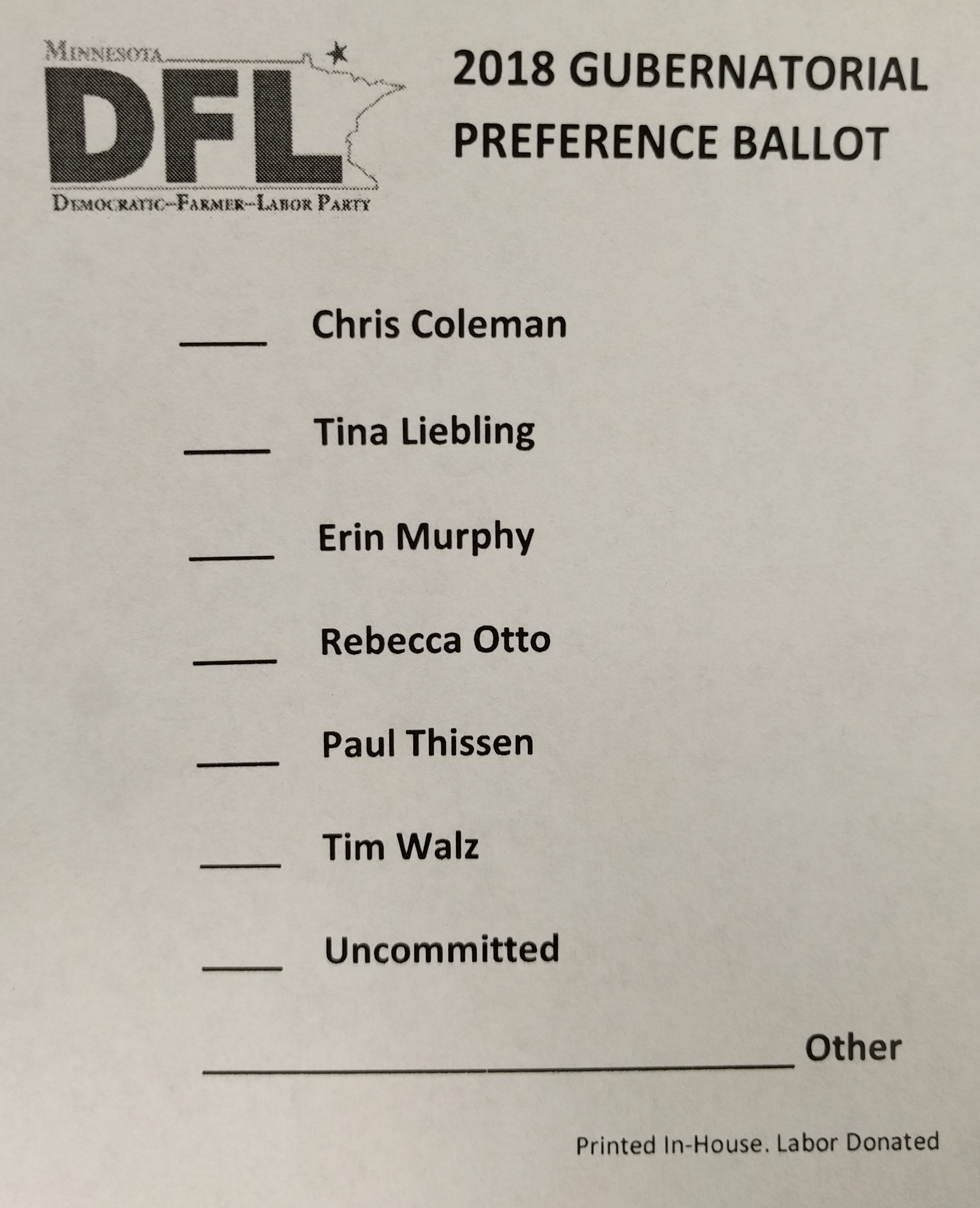
Straw poll ballot at the Minnesota DFL February 2018 precinct caucuses

On February 6, 2018, the DFL conducted a statewide straw poll among registered Democrats in Minnesota. Caucus-goers were scheduled to elect delegates to their party's Senate district and county conventions, which in turn would elect state convention delegates who would endorse candidates for governor, two U.S. Senate seats, attorney general, state auditor and secretary of state. Congressional district delegates would endorse U.S. House candidates. After the straw poll, the three lowest performing candidates withdrew from the race (Paul Thissen, Chris Coleman, and Tina Liebling).

Congressional unit	Total attendance	Chris Coleman	Tina Liebling	Erin Murphy	Rebecca Otto	Paul Thissen	Tim Walz	Other	Uncommitted
1	2,577	71	355	107	232	56	1,558	4	163
2	3,501	384	202	411	656	120	1,156	4	523
3	4,291	670	202	386	827	186	1,362	8	530
4	6,072	854	297	1,111	1,227	139	1,384	11	897
5	9,519	1,019	457	1,400	1,462	537	2,363	30	1,137
6	2,375	326	115	294	587	59	590	4	375
7	2,121	124	106	274	405	172	761	4	273
8	3,873	441	277	474	1,082	263	759	8	527
Statewide	34,329	3,889	2,011	4,457	6,478	1,532	9,933	73	4,425
Percent	-	11.86%	6.13%	13.59%	19.75%	4.67%	30.29%	0.22%	13.49%

=== Results ===
Results by county Walz: 30–40%; 40–50%; 50–60%; 60–70%; 70–80%; Murphy: 40–50%; Swanson: 30–40%; 40–50%; 50–60%

Results by congressional district Walz: 40–50%; 70–80%; Murphy: 40–50%; Swanson: 40–50%

Results by precinct Walz: 30–40%; 40–50%; 50–60%; 60–70%; 70–80%; 80–90%; >90%; Murphy: 20–30%; 30–40%; 40–50%; 50–60%; 60–70%; 70–80%; 80–90%; >90%; Swanson: 20–30%; 30–40%; 40–50%; 50–60%; 60–70%; 70–80%; 80–90%; >90%; Holden: 50–60%; 60–70%; >90%; Savior: >90%; Tied: 20-30%; 30-40%; 40-50%; 50%; No votes

Minnesota Democratic–Farmer–Labor Party primary results
Party	Candidate	Votes	%
Democratic (DFL)	Tim Walz	242,832	41.60%
Democratic (DFL)	Erin Murphy	186,969	32.03%
Democratic (DFL)	Lori Swanson	143,517	24.59%
Democratic (DFL)	Tim Holden	6,398	1.10%
Democratic (DFL)	Olé Savior	4,019	0.69%
Total votes		583,735	100.00%

== Republican primary ==
=== Candidates ===
==== Nominated ====
- Jeff Johnson, Hennepin County Commissioner, former state representative, and nominee for governor in 2014
  - Running mate: Donna Bergstrom, retired Marine Corps intelligence officer

==== Eliminated in primary ====
- Mathew Kruse
  - Running mate: Theresa Loeffler
- Tim Pawlenty, former governor and candidate for president in 2012
  - Running mate: Michelle Fischbach, incumbent lieutenant governor

==== Withdrew ====
- Christopher Chamberlin (ran for U.S. House)
- Matt Dean, state representative
- Keith Downey, former chairman of the Republican Party of Minnesota and former state representative
- Blake Huffman, Ramsey County Commissioner
- David Osmek, state senator
- Phillip Parrish, Naval Reserve intelligence officer and candidate for the U.S. Senate in 2014
- Mary Giuliani Stephens, mayor of Woodbury
  - Running mate: Jeff Backer, state representative

==== Declined ====
- Sarah Anderson, state representative
- Michele Bachmann, former U.S. representative and candidate for president in 2012
- Michelle Benson, state senator and candidate for lieutenant governor in 2014
- Kurt Daudt, speaker of the Minnesota House of Representatives (endorsed Pawlenty)
- Tom Emmer, U.S. representative and nominee for governor in 2010 (running for re-election)
- Karin Housley, state senator (ran for U.S. Senate)
- Amy Koch, former majority leader of the Minnesota Senate
- Mike Lindell, CEO of My Pillow
- Mike McFadden, businessman and nominee for the U.S. Senate in 2014
- Carla Nelson, state senator
- Erik Paulsen, U.S. representative from Minnesota's 3rd congressional district (ran for re-election)
- Julie Rosen, state senator (endorsed Pawlenty)
- Rich Stanek, Hennepin County sheriff and former state representative (ran for re-election)

=== Endorsements ===
Tim Pawlenty

State officials

- Josh Heintzeman, state representative
- John Jasinski, state senator
- Steve Sviggum, former speaker of the Minnesota House of Representatives
- Kurt Zellers, former Speaker of the Minnesota House of Representatives

Organizations

- Associated Builders and Contractors
- Housing First Minnesota
- Minnesota Chamber of Commerce
- Minnesota College Republicans
- Police Officers Federation of Minneapolis

Newspapers and publications

- Duluth News Tribune
- Mesabi Daily News
- Star Tribune

=== Polling ===
Poll source	Date(s) administered	Sample size	Margin of error	Jeff Johnson	Matt Kruse	Tim Pawlenty	Other	Undecided
Emerson College	August 8–11, 2018	156	± 8.0%	34%	–	43%	–	23%
Marist College	July 15–19, 2018	340	± 6.4%	32%	–	51%	1%	16%
BK Strategies (R)	June 24–25, 2018	439	± 4.7%	20%	3%	54%	–	23%

Hypothetical polling

Poll source	Date(s) administered	Sample size	Margin of error	Kurt Daudt	Keith Downey	Tom Emmer	Mike McFadden	Erik Paulsen	Tim Pawlenty	Rich Stanek	Undecided
SurveyUSA	November 17–19, 2016	–	–	2%	1%	4%	2%	8%	19%	1%	64%

Poll source	Date(s) administered	Sample size	Margin of error	Kurt Daudt	Matt Dean	Keith Downey	Jeff Johnson	Julie Rosen	Mary G. Stephens	Undecided
Mason-Dixon	January 8–10, 2018	218	–	12%	2%	1%	24%	4%	1%	54%

=== Results ===
Results by county Johnson: 40–50%; 50–60%; 60–70%; 70–80%; Pawlenty: 40–50%; 50–60%; 60–70%

Results by congressional district Johnson: 40–50%; 50–60%; Pawlenty: 40–50%

Republican Party of Minnesota primary results
Party	Candidate	Votes	%
Republican	Jeff Johnson	168,841	52.61%
Republican	Tim Pawlenty	140,743	43.86%
Republican	Mathew Kruse	11,330	3.53%
Total votes		320,914	100.00%

== Third parties and independents ==
=== Candidates ===
==== Declared ====
- Josh Welter (Libertarian Party)
- Chris Wright (Grassroots–Legalize Cannabis Party), Grassroots Party nominee for governor in 1998, 2010 and 2014

== General election ==
=== Predictions ===
Source	Ranking	As of
The Cook Political Report	Likely D	October 26, 2018
The Washington Post	Lean D	November 5, 2018
FiveThirtyEight	Likely D	November 5, 2018
Rothenberg Political Report	Likely D	November 1, 2018
Sabato's Crystal Ball	Lean D	November 5, 2018
RealClearPolitics	Lean D	November 4, 2018
Daily Kos	Likely D	November 5, 2018
Fox News (Note: The Fox News Midterm Power Rankings uniquely does not contain a category for Safe/Solid races)	Lean D	November 5, 2018
Politico	Likely D	November 5, 2018
Governing	Lean D	November 5, 2018

=== Debates ===
The debate season began only three days after the primaries, with Johnson and Walz participating in two debates on Friday, August 17. A third debate was held on Friday, August 31.

Host network/sponsors	Date	Link(s)	Participants	
Host network/sponsors	Date	Link(s)	Tim Walz (DFL)	Jeff Johnson (R)
MPR News	August 31, 2018		Invited	Invited
KSTP-TV	August 17, 2018		Invited	Invited
Twin Cities PBS (Almanac)	August 17, 2018		Invited	Invited

=== Endorsements ===
Jeff Johnson (R)

Executive branch officials

- Mike Pence, 48th vice president of the United States
- Donald Trump, 45th president of the United States

U.S. senators

- Marco Rubio, U.S. senator from Florida

U.S. representatives

- Tom Emmer, U.S. representative and 2010 nominee for governor

Statewide and local officials

- Michelle Benson, Minnesota state senator
- Matt Dean, state representative
- Carol Molnau, former Minnesota lieutenant governor
- Tim Pawlenty, former governor of Minnesota and candidate for governor
- Al Quie, former governor of Minnesota

Individuals

- Mike Lindell, conservative businessman and CEO of My Pillow

Organizations

- Minnesota Farm Bureau
- National Federation of Independent Business
- Police Officers Federation of Minneapolis
Tim Walz (DFL)

Federal officials

- Max Cleland, former U.S. senator
- Amy Klobuchar, U.S. senator
- Betty McCollum, U.S. representative
- Dennis McDonough, former chief of staff to Barack Obama
- Walter Mondale, former vice president, nominee for president in 1984, and former U.S. senator
- Rick Nolan, U.S. representative and former candidate for lieutenant governor
- Barack Obama, 44th president of the United States
- Collin Peterson, U.S. representative
- Tina Smith, U.S. senator

Newspapers

- Duluth News Tribune (general election)
- ECM Publishers
- Mesabi Daily News (general election)
- Minnesota Daily (general election)
- Star Tribune (general election)
- Winona Daily News (general election)

Mayors

- Rita Albrecht, mayor of Bemidji
- Robert Beussman, mayor of New Ulm
- Bob Byrnes, mayor of Marshall
- Rick Cannata, mayor of Hibbing
- Melvin Carter, mayor of St. Paul
- Molly Cummings, mayor of Hopkins
- Jacob Frey, mayor of Minneapolis
- Mary Gaasch, mayor of Lauderdale
- Eric Garcetti, mayor of Los Angeles
- Emily Larson, mayor of Duluth
- Kirsten Hagen-Kennedy, mayor of North Branch
- Mike Kuhle, mayor of Worthington
- Mike Maguire, mayor of Eagan
- Rick Miller, mayor of Waite Park
- Harold Peterson, mayor of Blooming Prairie
- Sarah Schroeder, mayor of Spring Grove
- Nancy Tyra-Lukens, mayor of Eden Prairie
- Ardell Brede, mayor of Rochester
- Ben Schierer, mayor of Fergus Falls
- Jim Hovland, mayor of Edina
- Shep Harris, mayor of Golden Valley
- Gary Skalko, mayor of Mountain Iron
- Roy Srp, mayor of Waseca
- Myron Bailey, mayor of Cottage Grove
- Pat Baustian, mayor of Luverne
- Bob Broeder, mayor of Le Seur
- Ted Kozlowski, mayor of Stillwater
- Jack L'Heureux, mayor of Mora
- Charles Novak, mayor of Ely
- Mark Peterson, mayor of Winona
- Dennis Phelps, mayor of Westbrook
- Mike Poellinger, mayor of La Crescent
- R. T. Rybak, former mayor of Minneapolis
- Gary Skalko, mayor of Mountain Iron
- Nora Slawik, mayor of Maplewood
- Dave Smiglewski, mayor of Granite Falls
- Tom Stiehm, mayor of Austin
- El Tinklenberg, former mayor of Blaine
- John Tuorilla, mayor of Columet

State and local officials

- Jamie Becker-Finn, state representative
- Karla Bigham, state senator
- Terri Bonoff, former state senator
- Robin Brown, former state representative
- Arne Carlson, former governor of Minnesota (R)
- Jim Carlson, state senator
- Greg Clausen, state senator
- Dick Cohen, state senator
- Jack Considine, state representative
- Kevin Dahle, former state senator
- Mark Dayton, governor of Minnesota
- John Dorn, former state representative
- Rob Eklund, state representative
- Nick Frentz, state senator
- Patti Fritz, former state representative
- Foung Hawj, state senator
- Jeff Hayden, state senator
- Jason Isaacson, state senator
- Alice Johnson, former state senator
- Clark Johnson, state representative
- Ruth Johnson, former state representative
- Steve Kelley, former state senator
- Susan Kent, state senator
- Ron Latz, state senator
- Fue Lee, state representative
- Tina Liebling, state representative and former candidate for governor
- Leon Lille, state representative
- Matt Little, state senator
- Tony Lourey, state senator
- Paul Marquart, state representative
- Erin Murphy, state representative, former candidate for governor
- John Persell, former state representative
- Jeanne Poppe, state representative
- Roger Reinert, former state senator
- Mark Ritchie, former Minnesota secretary of state
- Sharon Ropes, former state senator
- Don Samuelson, former state senator
- Duane Sauke, state representative
- Tom Saxhaug, former state senator
- Matt Schmit, former state senator
- Jennifer Schultz, state representative
- Yvonne Selcer, former state representative
- Kathy Sheran, former state senator
- Erik Simonson, state senator
- Rod Skoe, former state senator
- Loren Solberg, former state representative
- Dan Sparks, state senator
- Mike Sundin, state representative
- Ted Suss, former state representative
- Lori Swanson, Minnesota attorney general, former candidate for governor
- Chuck Wiger, state senator
- Cheryl Youakim, state representative

Local officials

- Betsy Tate Anderson, former Hopkins School Board
- David Boone, Robbinsdale School Board
- Jen Bouchard, Hopkins School Board
- Crystal Brakke, Richfield School Board
- Katy Campbell, Hopkins Council
- Anne Casey, St. Louis Park School Board
- Joanie Clausen, Golden Valley Council
- Mari Daily, Moorhead Council
- Jim Grabowska, St. Clair School Board
- Dan Hartman, former Duluth Council
- Michael Herring, Robbinsdale School Board
- Linda Higgins, Hennepin County commissioner
- Noah Hobbs, Duluth City Council
- Valerie Holthus, Andover City Council
- Andrew Johnson, Minneapolis City Council
- Chris LaTondresse, Hopkins School Board
- Pam Lindberg, Robbinsdale School Board
- Nevada Littlewolf, Virginia City Council
- Nancy Livingston, North St. Paul School Board
- Randy Maluchnik, Carver County commissioner
- Ken Morrison, St. Louis Park School Board
- Reed Olson, Beltrami County commissioner
- Linea Palmisano, Minneapolis City Council
- Todd Rengo, Esko School Board
- Gillian Rosenquist, Golden Valley Council
- Kevin Staunton, Edina City Council
- Vance Stuehrenberg, Blue Earth County commissioner
- Christian Torkelson, Little Canada Council
- Mary Tomback, St. Louis Park School Board
- Renee Van Nett, Duluth City Council
- Karen Waters, St. Louis Park School Board
- Gordy Wagner, Pope County commissioner
- Abdi Warsame, Minneapolis City Council

Individuals

- Wesley Clark, retired general, former Supreme Allied Commander of NATO
- Ken Martin, chair of the Minnesota DFL Party
- Judy Shepard, board president of Matthew Shepard Foundation, LGBT-rights activist
- David Wellstone, son of late senator Paul Wellstone

Tribal nations

- Mille Lacs Band of Ojibwe

Unions

- AFSCME Council 5 – American Federation of State, County and Municipal Employees
- American Federation of Government Employees
- Brotherhood of Maintenance of Way Employes
- Education Minnesota
- IBEW – International Brotherhood of Electrical Engineers – Minnesota State Council
- Inter Faculty Organization
- International Union of Operating Engineers – Local 49
- Ironworkers Local 512 – International Association of Bridge, Structural, Ornamental and Reinforcing Iron Workers
- IUPAT Local 82 – International Union of Painters and Allied Trades
- LiUNA! – Laborers' International Union of North America – Minnesota & North Dakota
- MAPE – Minnesota Association of Professional Employees
- Minnesota AFL–CIO
- Minneapolis Firefighters Local 82 – International Association of Fire Fighters
- Minnesota Pipe Trades
- Minnesota Professional Firefighters – International Association of Fire Fighters
- Minnesota State Building & Construction Trades Council
- Minnesota State Council of Machinists – International Association of Machinists and Aerospace Workers
- North Central States Regional Council of Carpenters – United Brotherhood of Carpenters and Joiners of America
- Roofers, Waterproofers & Allied Trades Local 96 – United Union of Roofers, Waterproofers and Allied Workers
- Service Employees International Union Minnesota
- SMART Sheet Metal Workers Local 10 – Sheet Metal Workers' International Association
- SMART Transportation Division, UTU – United Transportation Union
- Teamsters Joint Council 32
- Teamsters Local 120
- UFCW Local 1189 – United Food and Commercial Workers
- United Steelworkers District 11 – USW

National organizations

- NARAL Pro-Choice America – Minnesota chapter
- VoteVets.org

=== Polling ===
Poll source	Date(s) administered	Sample size	Margin of error	Tim Walz (DFL)	Jeff Johnson (R)	Josh Welter (L)	Other	Undecided
Change Research	November 2–4, 2018	953	–	53%	41%	2%	2%	–
Research Co.	November 1–3, 2018	450	± 4.6%	48%	42%	–	1%	9%
SurveyUSA	October 29–31, 2018	600	± 5.3%	49%	41%	–	2%	9%
St. Cloud State University	October 15–30, 2018	404	–	50%	34%	–	–	–
Mason-Dixon	October 15–17, 2018	800	± 3.5%	45%	39%	3%	2%	12%
Change Research	October 12–13, 2018	1,413	–	47%	44%	3%	4%	2%
Marist College	September 30 – October 4, 2018	637 LV	± 4.9%	51%	36%	6%	<1%	6%
Marist College	September 30 – October 4, 2018	637 LV	± 4.9%	55%	38%	–	<1%	7%
Marist College	September 30 – October 4, 2018	860 RV	± 4.2%	49%	37%	7%	<1%	7%
Marist College	September 30 – October 4, 2018	860 RV	± 4.2%	53%	39%	–	1%	8%
Mason-Dixon	September 10–12, 2018	800	± 3.5%	45%	36%	1%	2%	16%
SurveyUSA	September 6–8, 2018	574	± 4.9%	47%	40%	–	3%	10%
Suffolk University	August 17–20, 2018	500	± 4.4%	46%	41%	1%	1%	12%
Emerson College	August 8–11, 2018	500	± 4.6%	40%	33%	–	–	27%

Hypothetical polling

with Erin Murphy and Tim Pawlenty

Poll source	Date(s) administered	Sample size	Margin of error	Erin Murphy (D)	Tim Pawlenty (R)	Other	Undecided
Marist College	July 15–19, 2018	876	± 4.0%	48%	40%	2%	9%

with Lori Swanson and Tim Pawlenty

Poll source	Date(s) administered	Sample size	Margin of error	Lori Swanson (D)	Tim Pawlenty (R)	Other	Undecided
Emerson College	August 8–11, 2018	500	± 4.6%	44%	36%	–	21%
Marist College	July 15–19, 2018	876	± 4.0%	51%	40%	2%	7%
BK Strategies	June 24–25, 2018	1,574	± 2.5%	46%	41%	–	13%

with Tim Walz and Tim Pawlenty

Poll source	Date(s) administered	Sample size	Margin of error	Tim Walz (D)	Tim Pawlenty (R)	Other	Undecided
Emerson College	August 8–11, 2018	500	± 4.6%	44%	33%	–	23%
Marist College	July 15–19, 2018	876	± 4.0%	51%	40%	1%	8%
BK Strategies	June 24–25, 2018	1,574	± 2.5%	48%	41%	–	11%

with Lori Swanson and Jeff Johnson

Poll source	Date(s) administered	Sample size	Margin of error	Lori Swanson (D)	Jeff Johnson (R)	Undecided
Emerson College	August 8–11, 2018	500	± 4.6%	37%	32%	31%

Poll source	Date(s) administered	Sample size	Margin of error	Generic Democrat	Generic Republican	Undecided
BK Strategies	June 24–25, 2018	1,574	± 2.5%	48%	42%	10%
Public Policy Polling (D-A Better Minnesota)	June 15–16, 2018	717	–	46%	39%	16%

=== Results ===
2018 Minnesota gubernatorial election
Party	Candidate	Votes	%	±%
Democratic (DFL)	Tim Walz	1,393,096	53.84%	+3.77%
Republican	Jeff Johnson	1,097,705	42.43%	−2.08%
Grassroots—LC	Chris Wright	68,667	2.65%	+1.07%
Libertarian	Josh Welter	26,735	1.03%	+0.11%
Write-in		1,084	0.04%	0.00%
Total votes		2,587,287	100.00%	N/A
Democratic (DFL) hold				

==== By county ====
County	Tim Walz DFL		Jeff Johnson Republican		Various candidates Other parties		Margin		Total votes cast
County	#	%	#	%	#	%	#	%	Total votes cast
Aitkin	5,400	36.7%	8,754	59.6%	543	3.7%	-3,384	-22.9%	14,727
Anoka	76,239	47.9%	75,957	47.7%	7,090	4.4%	282	0.2%	159,286
Becker	3,360	41.3%	4,481	55.0%	303	3.7%	-1,121	-13.7%	8,144
Beltrami	8,848	49.3%	8,328	46.4%	778	4.3%	520	2.9%	17,954
Benton	6,020	37.5%	9,405	58.6%	623	3.9%	-3,385	-21.1%	16,048
Big Stone	1,111	43.2%	1,353	52.6%	109	4.2%	-242	-9.4%	2,573
Blue Earth	16,317	58.0%	10,806	38.4%	1,012	3.6%	5,511	19.6%	28,135
Brown	4,932	41.8%	6,461	54.7%	416	3.5%	-1,529	-12.9%	11,809
Carlton	9,051	55.5%	6,621	40.6%	640	3.9%	2,430	14.9%	16,312
Carver	22,334	43.9%	26,822	52.7%	1,700	3.4%	-4,488	-8.8%	50,856
Cass	5,319	38.0%	8,145	58.3%	517	3.7%	-2,826	-20.3%	13,981
Chippewa	2,261	41.1%	3,008	54.6%	238	4.3%	-747	-15.5%	5,507
Chisago	10,091	39.2%	14,556	56.5%	1,127	4.3%	-4,465	-17.3%	25,774
Clay	12,748	52.6%	10,301	42.5%	1,170	4.8%	2,447	10.1%	24,219
Clearwater	1,125	32.4%	2,239	64.6%	103	2.9%	-1,114	-32.2%	3,467
Cook	2,054	64.4%	1,009	31.6%	128	4.0%	1,045	32.8%	3,191
Cottonwood	2,045	40.7%	2,843	56.6%	131	2.6%	-798	-15.9%	5,019
Crow Wing	11,866	37.9%	18,176	58.1%	1,268	4.0%	-6,310	-20.2%	31,310
Dakota	111,429	53.9%	87,266	42.2%	8,706	3.8%	24,163	11.7%	206,771
Dodge	3,773	41.3%	5,037	55.2%	318	3.5%	-1,264	-13.9%	9,128
Douglas	6,643	36.8%	10,901	60.4%	501	2.7%	-4,258	-23.6%	18,045
Faribault	2,627	41.3%	3,495	54.9%	242	3.7%	-868	-13.6%	6,364
Fillmore	4,607	47.5%	4,797	49.4%	300	3.1%	-190	-1.9%	9,704
Freeborn	6,846	49.0%	6,651	47.6%	473	3.3%	195	1.4%	13,970
Goodhue	10,471	45.3%	11,668	50.5%	952	4.1%	-1,197	-5.2%	23,091
Grant	1,287	41.3%	1,710	54.9%	118	3.8%	-423	-13.6%	3,115
Hennepin	422,618	67.4%	182,128	29.1%	21,916	3.5%	240,490	38.3%	626,662
Houston	4,416	49.3%	4,269	47.7%	271	3.0%	147	1.6%	8,956
Hubbard	3,883	38.3%	5,885	58.1%	362	3.6%	-2,002	-19.8%	10,130
Isanti	6,084	35.1%	10,483	60.4%	784	4.5%	-4,399	-25.3%	17,351
Itasca	10,130	47.0%	10,470	48.6%	962	4.4%	-340	-1.6%	21,562
Jackson	1,879	40.3%	2,594	55.7%	188	4.0%	-715	-15.4%	4,661
Kanabec	2,547	38.0%	3,853	57.5%	302	4.5%	-1,306	-19.5%	6,702
Kandiyohi	7,490	40.3%	10,438	56.1%	676	3.6%	-2,948	-15.8%	18,604
Kittson	1,085	46.5%	1,149	49.2%	100	4.3%	-64	-2.7%	2,334
Koochiching	2,541	48.7%	2,512	48.1%	165	3.2%	29	0.6%	5,218
Lac Qui Parle	1,461	43.6%	1,776	53.0%	114	3.4%	-315	-9.4%	3,351
Lake	3,264	55.4%	2,432	41.2%	200	3.3%	832	14.2%	5,896
Lake of the Woods	601	32.8%	1,171	63.9%	61	3.3%	-570	-29.1%	1,833
Le Sueur	5,533	43.2%	6,827	53.3%	444	3.5%	-1,294	-10.1%	12,804
Lincoln	1,049	43.2%	1,326	54.5%	56	2.3%	-277	-11.3%	2,431
Lyon	4,143	41.6%	5,468	54.9%	345	3.4%	-1,325	-13.3%	9,956
McLeod	5,241	35.2%	9,065	60.8%	596	4.0%	-3,824	-25.6%	14,902
Mahnomen	992	52.0%	823	43.2%	92	4.9%	169	8.8%	1,907
Marshall	1,436	35.1%	2,512	61.4%	140	3.4%	-1,076	-26.3%	4,088
Martin	3,232	37.0%	5,190	59.5%	307	3.4%	-1,958	-22.5%	8,729
Meeker	3,584	34.8%	6,325	61.4%	398	3.9%	-2,741	-26.6%	10,307
Mille Lacs	3,927	36.6%	6,292	58.7%	498	4.6%	-2,365	-22.1%	10,717
Morrison	4,123	28.9%	9,711	68.0%	452	3.1%	-5,588	-39.1%	14,286
Mower	8,690	52.4%	6,464	44.1%	518	3.5%	1,226	8.3%	14,672
Murray	1,676	40.7%	2,323	56.4%	123	2.9%	-647	-15.7%	4,122
Nicollet	9,156	58.2%	6,132	39.0%	445	2.8%	3,024	19.2%	15,733
Nobles	3,000	43.0%	3,734	53.6%	237	3.4%	-734	-10.6%	6,971
Norman	1,280	47.7%	1,280	47.7%	122	4.6%	0	0.0%	2,682
Olmsted	38,613	54.3%	30,517	42.9%	2,015	2.8%	8,096	11.4%	71,145
Otter Tail	9,873	36.1%	16,622	60.7%	870	3.1%	-6,749	-24.6%	27,365
Pennington	2,183	40.7%	2,949	55.0%	227	4.3%	-766	-14.3%	5,359
Pine	4,793	41.5%	6,240	54.0%	524	4.5%	-1,447	-12.5%	11,557
Pipestone	1,228	33.1%	2,379	64.1%	104	2.9%	-1,151	-31.0%	3,711
Polk	4,642	39.4%	6,736	57.1%	418	3.6%	-2,094	-17.7%	11,796
Pope	2,276	41.8%	3,014	55.4%	151	2.7%	-738	-13.6%	5,441
Ramsey	170,553	69.9%	63,685	26.1%	9,798	4.0%	106,868	43.8%	244,036
Red Lake	724	44.1%	855	52.0%	64	3.9%	-131	-7.9%	1,643
Redwood	2,154	34.7%	3,855	62.1%	197	3.1%	-1,701	-27.4%	6,206
Renville	2,470	39.4%	3,562	56.8%	238	3.8%	-1,092	-17.4%	6,270
Rice	14,910	52.5%	12,353	43.5%	1,117	3.9%	2,557	9.0%	28,380
Rock	1,390	36.9%	2,288	60.8%	87	2.3%	-898	-23.9%	3,765
Roseau	1,915	29.7%	4,335	67.3%	192	3.0%	-2,420	-37.6%	6,442
St. Louis	60,383	60.7%	35,212	35.4%	3,852	3.8%	25,171	25.3%	99,447
Scott	29,223	44.3%	34,201	51.8%	2,616	4.0%	-4,978	-6.5%	66,040
Sherburne	13,851	35.3%	23,721	60.5%	1,659	4.2%	-9,870	-25.2%	39,231
Sibley	2,387	36.4%	3,936	60.0%	240	3.6%	-1,549	-23.6%	6,563
Stearns	26,707	40.5%	36,830	55.9%	2,388	3.6%	-10,123	-15.4%	65,925
Steele	6,991	42.8%	8,733	53.5%	602	3.7%	-1,742	-10.7%	16,326
Stevens	1,916	43.8%	2,306	52.7%	156	3.5%	-390	-8.9%	4,378
Swift	1,751	43.3%	2,179	53.9%	111	2.7%	-428	-10.6%	4,041
Todd	3,058	31.8%	6,244	65.0%	300	3.1%	-3,186	-33.2%	9,602
Traverse	649	43.0%	806	53.3%	56	3.8%	-157	-10.3%	1,511
Wabasha	4,311	43.2%	5,324	53.3%	352	3.5%	-1,013	-10.1%	9,987
Wadena	1,731	31.2%	3,667	66.1%	146	2.6%	-1,936	-34.9%	5,544
Waseca	3,500	42.9%	4,406	54.0%	247	3.0%	-906	-11.1%	8,153
Washington	67,751	52.2%	57,537	44.3%	4,465	3.4%	10,214	7.9%	129,753
Watonwan	2,005	48.5%	2,018	48.9%	107	2.5%	-13	-0.4%	4,130
Wilkin	925	36.2%	1,528	59.8%	104	4.1%	-603	-23.6%	2,557
Winona	11,893	55.7%	8,679	40.6%	789	3.6%	3,214	15.1%	21,361
Wright	21,834	36.9%	34,992	59.1%	2,417	4.0%	-13,158	-22.2%	59,243
Yellow Medicine	1,641	38.1%	2,544	59.0%	127	2.9%	-903	-20.9%	4,312
Totals	1,393,096	53.8%	1,097,705	42.4%	96,486	3.7%	295,391	11.4%	2,587,287

Counties that flipped from Democratic to Republican

- Aitkin (largest city: Aitkin)
- Big Stone (largest city: Ortonville)
- Chippewa (largest city: Montevideo)
- Grant (largest city: Elbow Lake)
- Itasca (largest city: Grand Rapids)
- Kittson (largest city: Hallock)
- Lac qui Parle (largest city: Madison)
- Marshall (largest city: Warren)
- Pennington (largest city: Thief River Falls)
- Pine (largest city: Pine City)
- Pope (largest city: Glenwood)
- Red Lake (largest city: Red Lake Falls)
- Stevens (largest city: Morris)
- Swift (largest city: Benson)
- Traverse (largest city: Wheaton)
- Watonwan (largest city: St. James)

Counties that flipped from Democratic to Tied

- Norman (largest city: Ada)

Counties that flipped from Republican to Democratic

- Anoka (largest city: Blaine)
- Dakota (largest city: Lakeville)
- Olmsted (largest city: Rochester)
- Washington (largest city: Woodbury)

==== By congressional district ====
Walz won five of eight congressional districts, with the remaining three going to Johnson. Each candidate won a district that elected a representative of the other party.

District	Walz	Johnson	Representative
1st	50%	47%	Jim Hagedorn
2nd	51%	45%	Angie Craig
3rd	54%	42%	Dean Phillips
4th	66%	31%	Betty McCollum
5th	78%	18%	Ilhan Omar
6th	41%	55%	Tom Emmer
7th	40%	57%	Collin Peterson
8th	47%	49%	Pete Stauber

== Analysis ==
=== Voter demographics ===
Edison Research exit poll
Demographic subgroup	Walz	Johnson	No answer	% of voters
Gender
Men	48	49	3	46
Women	59	37	4	54
Age
18–24 years old	71	25	4	6
25–29 years old	63	34	3	5
30–39 years old	60	38	2	12
40–49 years old	51	46	3	13
50–64 years old	54	45	1	29
65 and older	52	46	2	35
Race
White	53	46	1	89
Black	84	14	2	5
Latino	N/A	N/A	N/A	3
Asian	N/A	N/A	N/A	2
Other	N/A	N/A	N/A	2
Race by gender
White men	46	53	1	41
White women	59	39	2	48
Black men	N/A	N/A	N/A	3
Black women	N/A	N/A	N/A	2
Latino men	N/A	N/A	N/A	1
Latino women	N/A	N/A	N/A	1
Others	N/A	N/A	N/A	3
Education
High school or less	52	45	3	17
Some college education	48	49	3	24
Associate degree	48	49	3	17
Bachelor's degree	56	40	4	26
Advanced degree	70	28	2	16
Education and race
White college graduates	61	35	4	38
White no college degree	46	51	3	51
Non-white college graduates	70	26	4	4
Non-white no college degree	74	23	3	7
Whites by education and gender
White women with college degrees	68	29	3	21
White women without college degrees	51	45	4	28
White men with college degrees	54	43	3	17
White men without college degrees	40	58	2	23
Non-whites	73	24	3	11
Income
Under $30,000	63	34	3	14
$30,000–49,999	54	43	3	21
$50,000–99,999	48	51	1	36
$100,000–199,999	55	42	3	23
Over $200,000	N/A	N/A	N/A	7
Party ID
Democrats	95	5	N/A	39
Republicans	10	90	N/A	32
Independents	51	42	7	28
Party by gender
Democratic men	94	5	1	14
Democratic women	95	4	1	25
Republican men	8	92	N/A	16
Republican women	12	88	N/A	17
Independent men	47	48	5	16
Independent women	58	34	8	13
Ideology
Liberals	94	2	4	27
Moderates	65	32	3	39
Conservatives	10	87	3	33
Marital status
Married	47	49	4	68
Unmarried	63	33	4	32
Gender by marital status
Married men	43	54	3	31
Married women	51	45	4	36
Unmarried men	52	43	5	15
Unmarried women	72	24	4	18
First-time midterm election voter
Yes	52	44	4	12
No	55	42	3	88
Most important issue facing the country
Health care	74	24	2	50
Immigration	20	79	1	22
Economy	30	67	3	18
Gun policy	N/A	N/A	N/A	8
Area type
Urban	67	30	3	40
Suburban	50	46	4	32
Rural	41	56	3	28
Source: CNN

== See also ==
- 2018 Minnesota elections
- 2018 Minnesota House of Representatives election
- 2018 United States House of Representatives elections in Minnesota
- 2018 United States Senate special election in Minnesota
- 2018 United States Senate election in Minnesota
