= Jeff Johnson (Minnesota politician) =

American politician (born 1966)

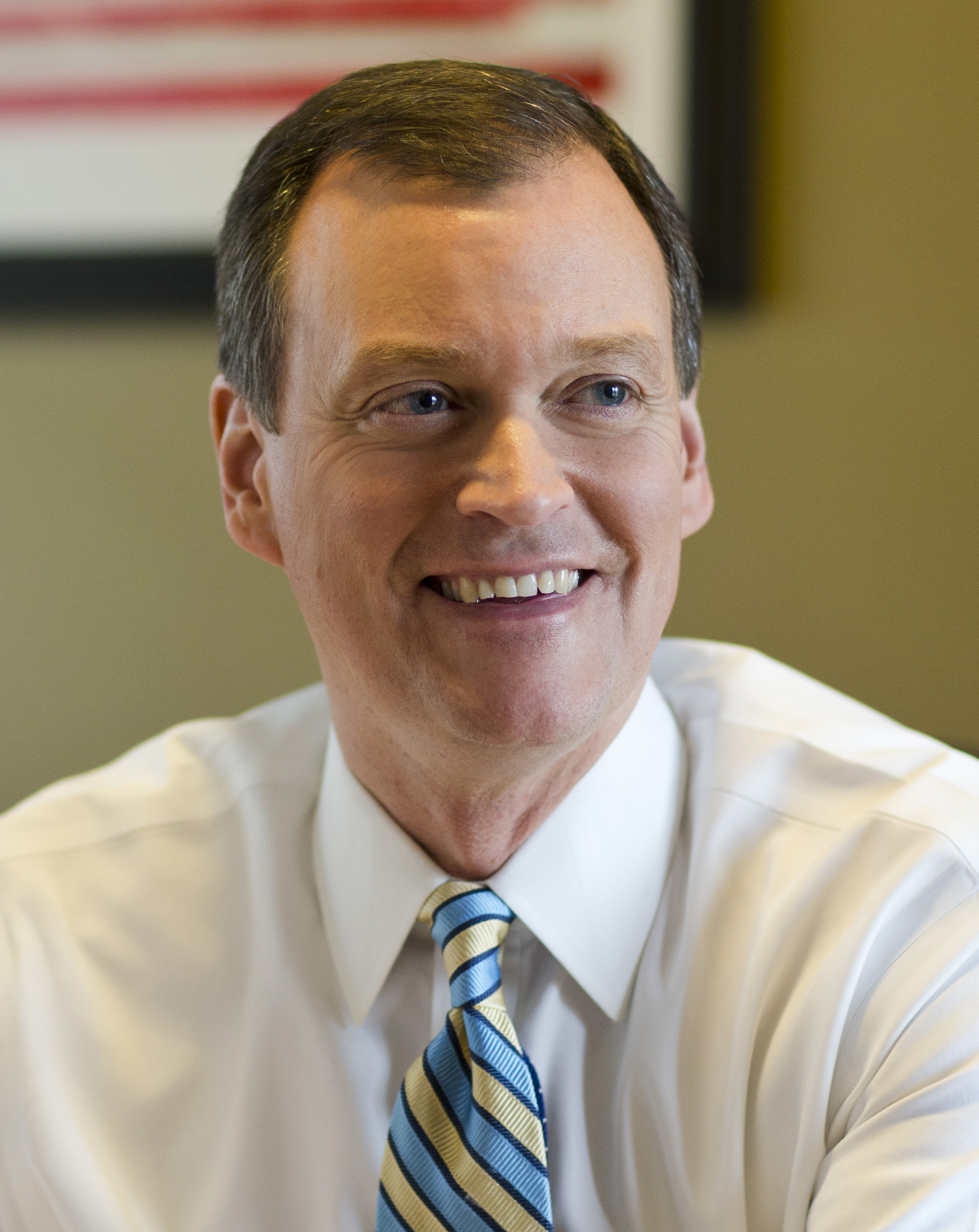
- Johnson in 2017

Member of the Hennepin County Board of Commissioners from the 7th district
- In office January 1, 2009 – January 4, 2021
- Preceded by: Penny Steele
- Succeeded by: Kevin Anderson

Member of the Minnesota House of Representatives
- In office January 3, 2001 – January 3, 2007
- Preceded by: Todd Van Dellen
- Succeeded by: Sarah Anderson
- Constituency: District 43A (2003–2007); District 34B (2001–2003)

Personal details
- Born: November 11, 1966 (age 59) Detroit Lakes, Minnesota, U.S.
- Party: Republican
- Spouse: Sondi Johnson
- Children: 2
- Education: Concordia College (BA); Georgetown University (JD)

Jeff Johnson (born November 11, 1966) is an American politician. He was elected to the Minnesota House of Representatives in 2000 and served there from 2001 to 2007. Johnson left the legislature to run for state attorney general in 2006, but was defeated. Johnson served as a Hennepin County commissioner for the 7th district from 2009 to 2021. He was elected as the Republican National Committeeman from Minnesota in April 2011.

Johnson was the Republican nominee for governor of Minnesota in 2014, losing to incumbent Democrat Mark Dayton, and again in 2018, losing to the Democratic nominee, U.S. Representative Tim Walz.

== Early life, education, and career ==
Born in Detroit Lakes, Minnesota, Johnson graduated from Detroit Lakes High School in Minnesota in 1985. He received a triple Bachelor of Arts in economics and political science/history in 1989 from Concordia College and attended Georgetown University Law School, earning a J.D. in 1992. Johnson then practiced at the law firms of Lord, Bissell and Brook in Chicago and Parsinen, Kaplan & Levy in Minneapolis. He joined Cargill in 1998, practicing employment and labor law until starting his own company, Midwest Employment Resources, providing employment law and human resources services.

== Political career ==
In 2000, Johnson was elected to represent District 34B in the Minnesota House of Representatives, winning 62.8% of the vote. The seat had been vacated by Henry Todd Van Dellen, who had retired. In 2006, Johnson ran for state attorney general and lost to the DFL nominee, Lori Swanson, with 40.72% of the vote.

In 2011, Johnson ran against Tom Emmer for the position of Minnesota's Republican National Committeeman, winning an upset victory. In 2012, he was elected without opposition to a full four-year term as Committeeman.

On May 5, 2013, Johnson announced his candidacy for governor. He received the Republican Party's endorsement at its May 2014 convention, and defeated four other candidates in the August 12 primary to become the party's nominee to challenge incumbent governor Mark Dayton. He lost the November general election by a six-point margin.

On May 10, 2017, Johnson announced that he would again seek the Republican endorsement for governor of Minnesota. On June 2, 2018, the Republican Party of Minnesota formally endorsed him at their state convention in Duluth. On August 14, in what many political commentators considered an upset, Johnson defeated former governor Tim Pawlenty in the primary election to become the party's nominee. President Donald Trump then endorsed Johnson. He lost the general election to the Democratic nominee, U.S. Representative Tim Walz, 54% to 42%.

== KingFish purchase ==
In March 2010, the Hennepin County Board tabled a request by Sheriff Rich Stanek to spend $426,150 to acquire the cellphone spying program KingFish. Johnson voted against tabling the motion, with the Star Tribune reporting that "Commissioner Jeff Johnson said he was convinced it was an important and useful law enforcement tool that wouldn't violate privacy rights." Johnson was absent the day funding was finally approved. Johnson later wrote in a blog post that he was able to ask Stanek's office questions about KingFish and was "...quite comfortable with the answers" he received.

In December 2013, Johnson publicly repudiated his KingFish vote. While admitting that he had supported it, he said it was one of the "votes I might choose to change".

Party political offices
| Preceded by Thomas Kelly | Republican nominee for Attorney General of Minnesota; 2006 | Succeeded by Christopher Barden |
| Preceded by Tom Emmer | Republican nominee for Governor of Minnesota; 2014, 2018 | Succeeded by Scott Jensen |
