= Scott Newman (politician) =

American politician

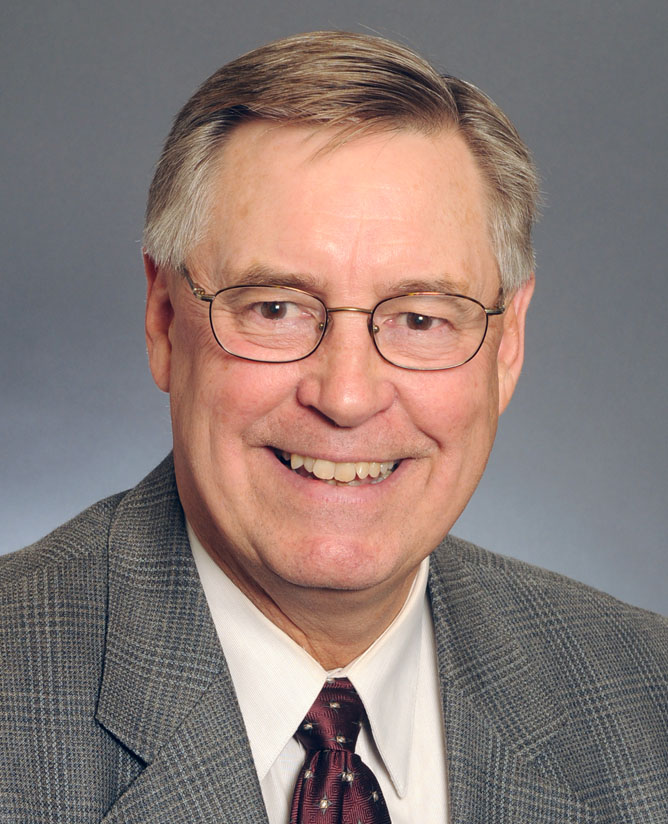

Member of the Minnesota Senate from the 18th district
- In office January 4, 2011 – January 2, 2023
- Preceded by: Steve Dille

Member of the Minnesota House of Representatives from the 18A district
- In office January 8, 2004 – January 2, 2007
- Preceded by: Tony Kielkucki
- Succeeded by: Ron Shimanski

Personal details
- Born: January 14, 1947 (age 79) Hutchinson, Minnesota, U.S.
- Party: Republican
- Spouse: Ginny
- Children: 3
- Education: Minnesota State University, Mankato; William Mitchell College of Law
- Occupation: attorney, legislator

Scott J. Newman (born January 14, 1947) is an American attorney and former Republican member of the Minnesota Senate. He represented Senate District 18, which includes portions of McLeod, Meeker, Sibley and Wright counties just west of the Twin Cities metropolitan area. He is also a former member of the Minnesota House of Representatives and was the Republican nominee for attorney general in the 2014 election.

== Early life, education, and career ==
Newman graduated from Minnesota State University, Mankato in Mankato, receiving his B.A. in history and political science. He later earned his J.D. from William Mitchell College of Law in Saint Paul.

He previously worked as a deputy sheriff in Hennepin County, as a public defender, and as an administrative law judge.

Newman ran unsuccessfully as the Republican party endorsed candidate for the 1st Judicial District Court Judge in the 2006 election.

== Minnesota House of Representatives ==
Newman served in the Minnesota House of Representatives from 2004 to 2007, running in a 2003 special election after Rep. Tony Kielkucki resigned to accept an appointment as a deputy secretary of state. While in the House, he served on the Education Finance, the Education Policy, the Governmental Operations and Veterans Affairs Policy, the State Government Finance, the Ethics, the Public Safety Policy and Finance, and the Transportation committees.

== Minnesota Senate ==
Newman was first elected to the Senate in 2010, running after longtime incumbent Senator Steve Dille announced he would not seek re-election. Newman was re-elected in 2012, 2016 and 2020. While in office, he served as chairman of the Senate Transportation Finance and Policy Committee.

Party political offices
Preceded by Christopher Barden	Republican nominee for Attorney General of Minnesota; 2014	Succeeded by Doug Wardlow
Minnesota Senate
Preceded by Steve Dille	Senator from the 18th district 2011–present	Incumbent
Minnesota House of Representatives
Preceded by Tony Kielkucki	Member of the House of Representatives from the 18A district 2004–2007	Succeeded by Ron Shimanski
