= Lori Swanson =

American politician

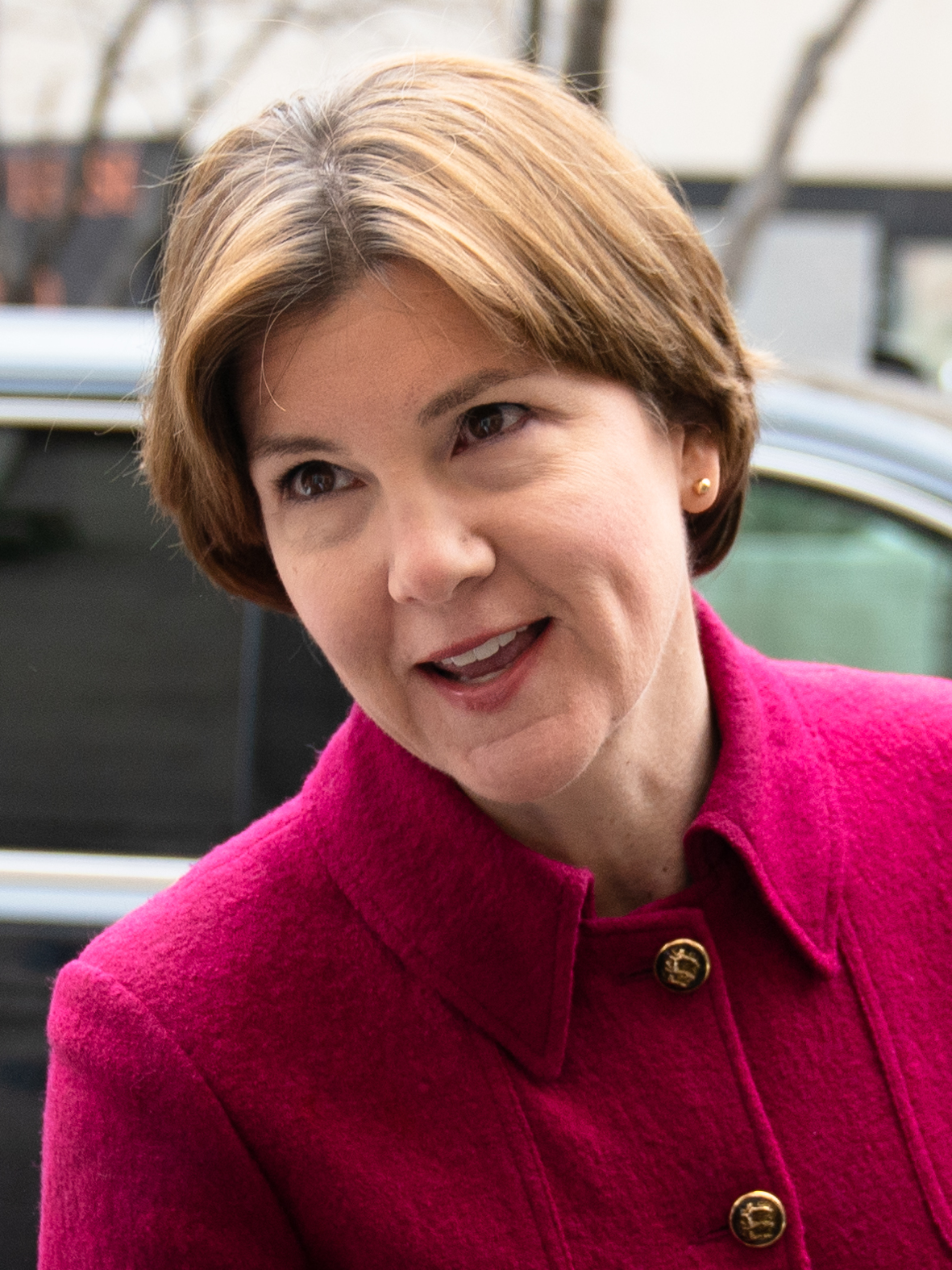
- Swanson in 2019

29th Attorney General of Minnesota
- In office January 2, 2007 – January 7, 2019
- Governor: Tim Pawlenty; Mark Dayton
- Preceded by: Mike Hatch
- Succeeded by: Keith Ellison

Personal details
- Born: December 16, 1966 (age 59)
- Party: Democratic
- Education: University of Wisconsin, Madison (BA); William Mitchell College of Law (JD)

Lori Swanson (born December 16, 1966) is an American lawyer and politician who served as the attorney general of Minnesota from 2007 to 2019. She was the first female attorney general elected in Minnesota. In 2018, she ran for Governor of Minnesota with running mate U.S. Representative Rick Nolan finishing in third place in the Democratic-Farmer-Labor primary.

After leaving public office, Swanson founded a law firm with Mike Hatch, her predecessor as attorney general.

== Early life and education ==
Swanson was born on December 16, 1966. She earned her undergraduate degree from the University of Wisconsin-Madison and her J.D. magna cum laude from William Mitchell College of Law in Saint Paul.

== Early legal career ==
Swanson served as deputy attorney general during Mike Hatch's first term, and as solicitor general during his second term. She also served as chair of the Consumer Advisory Council to the Federal Reserve Board of Governors in Washington, D.C., in 2006. Swanson was appointed to the Consumer Advisory Council of the Federal Reserve board of governors in Washington, D.C., in 2004. Swanson was appointed as vice-chair of the council in 2005. She was appointed chair of the council in 2006.

== Attorney General of Minnesota ==
=== 2007–2011: First term ===
She was elected Minnesota Attorney General on November 7, 2006, and took office on January 2, 2007, becoming the first woman to serve as Minnesota's attorney general. She also became the first William Mitchell College of Law grad to serve as the Minnesota Attorney General, ending the University of Minnesota Law School's continued streak of holding the office since in 1929.

After being sworn in as attorney general, Swanson filed a series of lawsuits against life insurance companies that sold unsuitable annuities to senior citizens. She argued that the insurance companies were responsible for agents who sold long-term annuities with high surrender charge to the elderly. In 2007 and 2008, she sued several insurers, including Allianz Life Insurance Company, American Equity Life Insurance Company, Midland National Life Insurance company, AmeriUs Life Insurance Company and American Investors Life Insurance. The lawsuits resulted in settlements that provided for industry-wide reforms and hundreds of millions of dollars in refund offers to senior citizens. Swanson testified in the U.S. Senate Committee on Aging about the need for insurance companies to require sales agents to ensure the suitability of the sale of an insurance product.

As Swanson took office, the country was beginning to face a housing crisis and eventual recession spurred by predatory subprime mortgage lending. Before she took office, Swanson announced a predatory lending working group to make recommendations to legislators for reforming abuses in the mortgage industry. The group made a number of recommendations, such as the elimination of “no doc” mortgages in which a loan is issued without proof of a borrower's ability to repay it. Many of these proposals were enacted into law, and the Martin Luther King-inspired Drum Major Institute called them one of the 10 best public policy proposals in the United States. A New York Times editorial heralded the law in 2009. Swanson was asked to testify before the United States Congress and the Federal Reserve Board of Governors about the Minnesota reforms. During the housing crisis, Swanson filed 19 lawsuits against mortgage foreclosure companies that defrauded homeowners by charging thousands of dollars and falsely promising to help save their homes from foreclosure. Swanson entered into settlements with a number of national banks for their role in the foreclosure crisis, giving the money back to homeowners who were victimized by the banks’ conduct.

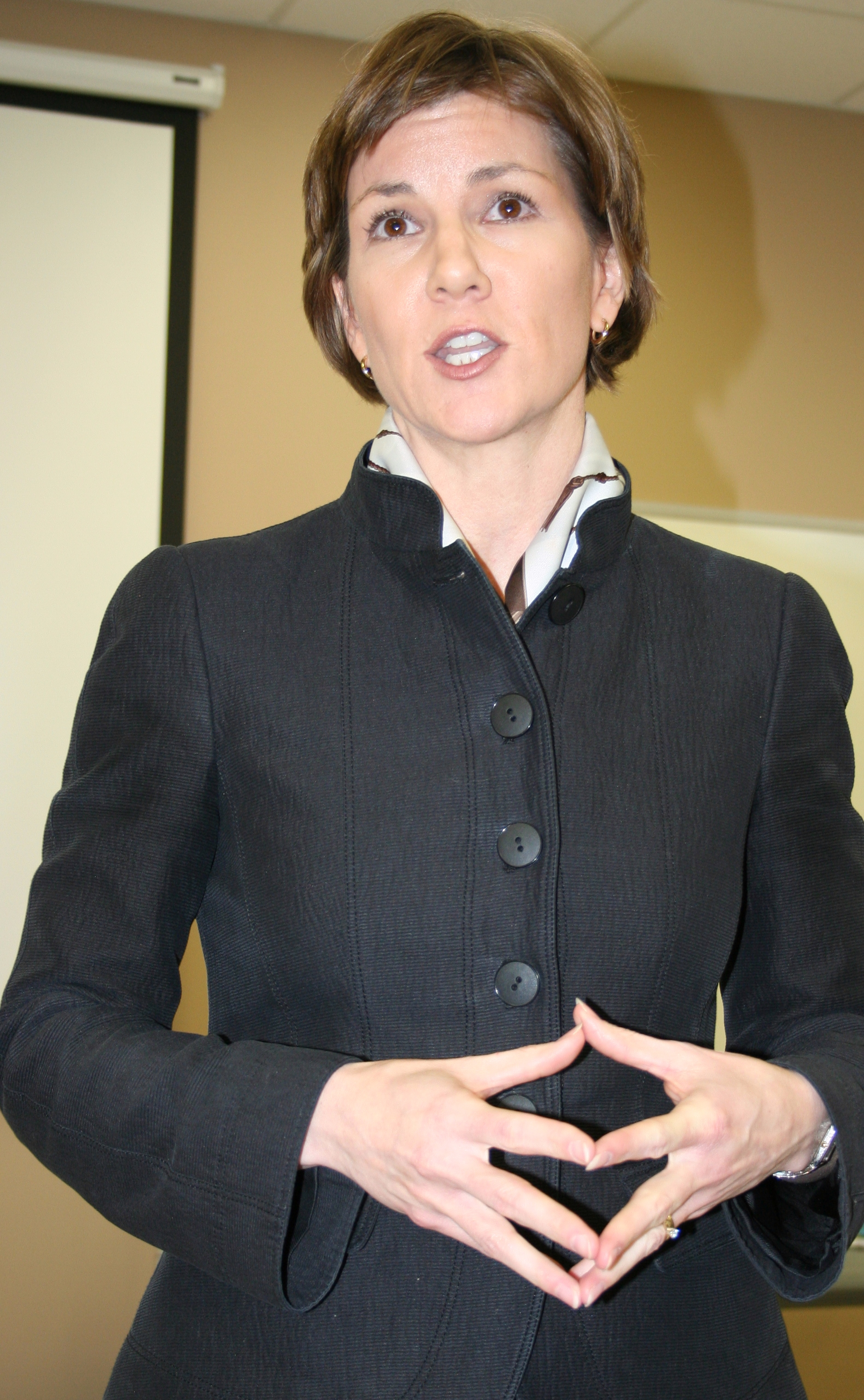
Swanson in 2009

In 2007, a group of attorneys working for Swanson attempted to form a union with the help of AFSCME council 5 to improve their working conditions and provide some protection from being asked to violate the Minnesota Rules of Professional Conduct by bringing baseless lawsuits against individuals and organizations to suit Swanson's political aspirations. As of April 2017, three months into Swanson's tenure, at least 30 members of Swanson's staff had left the office. On March 7, 2008, MinnPost reported on the internal fight for unionization that was still ongoing, including reports that attorneys who did not support Swanson politically were given punishment assignments or were removed from cases. Later on that spring, in May 2008, an attorney who publicly advocated for the formation of a union, Amy Lawler, was fired by Swanson.

In 2009, Swanson filed a lawsuit against National Arbitration Forum (NAF), at that time the largest consumer arbitration organization in the country. NAF had been criticized by consumer advocacy groups, U.S. Senators, and Public Citizen for bias against consumers. Swanson alleged that NAF was owned by a group of equity funds that also were simultaneously affiliated with a national debt collection agency, Axiant, and the administration of the largest collection law firm at the time, Mann Brakken. In July 2009 NAF signed a consent order with Swanson agreeing to stop arbitrating consumer claims. Shortly thereafter, Axiant and Mann Bracken went out of business.

Swanson was re-elected on November 2, 2010, defeating Republican challenger Chris Barden.

=== 2011–2015: Second term ===
In January 2012, Swanson sued Accretive Health, a billing and revenue consulting firm hired by two Twin Cities hospitals, for losing patient data on a lap top. At the time, Accretive was a multibillion-dollar publicly traded company. The lawsuit expanded when Swanson discovered that, unbeknownst to the patients, the data was being used to calculate the “frailty condition” of patients, complete with a “complexity score” of the physical condition of patients. In April 2012, the lawsuit again expanded when Swanson alleged that Accretive embedded bill collectors in the emergency rooms of hospitals and demanded payment by patients before and during treatment. Chicago Mayor Rahm Emanuel then intervened on behalf of Chicago-based Accretive to stop the litigation, which Swanson declined to do. The litigation ended with Accretive paying a $2.5 million penalty and being banned from the state. Accretive is believed to be the first NYSE company to be banned from doing business in a state.

In April 2013, Swanson intervened in a proposed merger of South Dakota–based Sanford Health and Fairview Health Systems. The merger would have included the control of the University of Minnesota Hospital System by the out-of-state Sanford. Swanson convened a hearing on the proposed merger in the State Capitol, grilling executives of the three organizations about the impact of the merger on the 23,000 Fairview employees in Minnesota and the $1.2 billion in assets held by the non-profit Fairview. The hearing was hotly contested. On April 10, 2013, Sanford withdrew from the merger discussion.

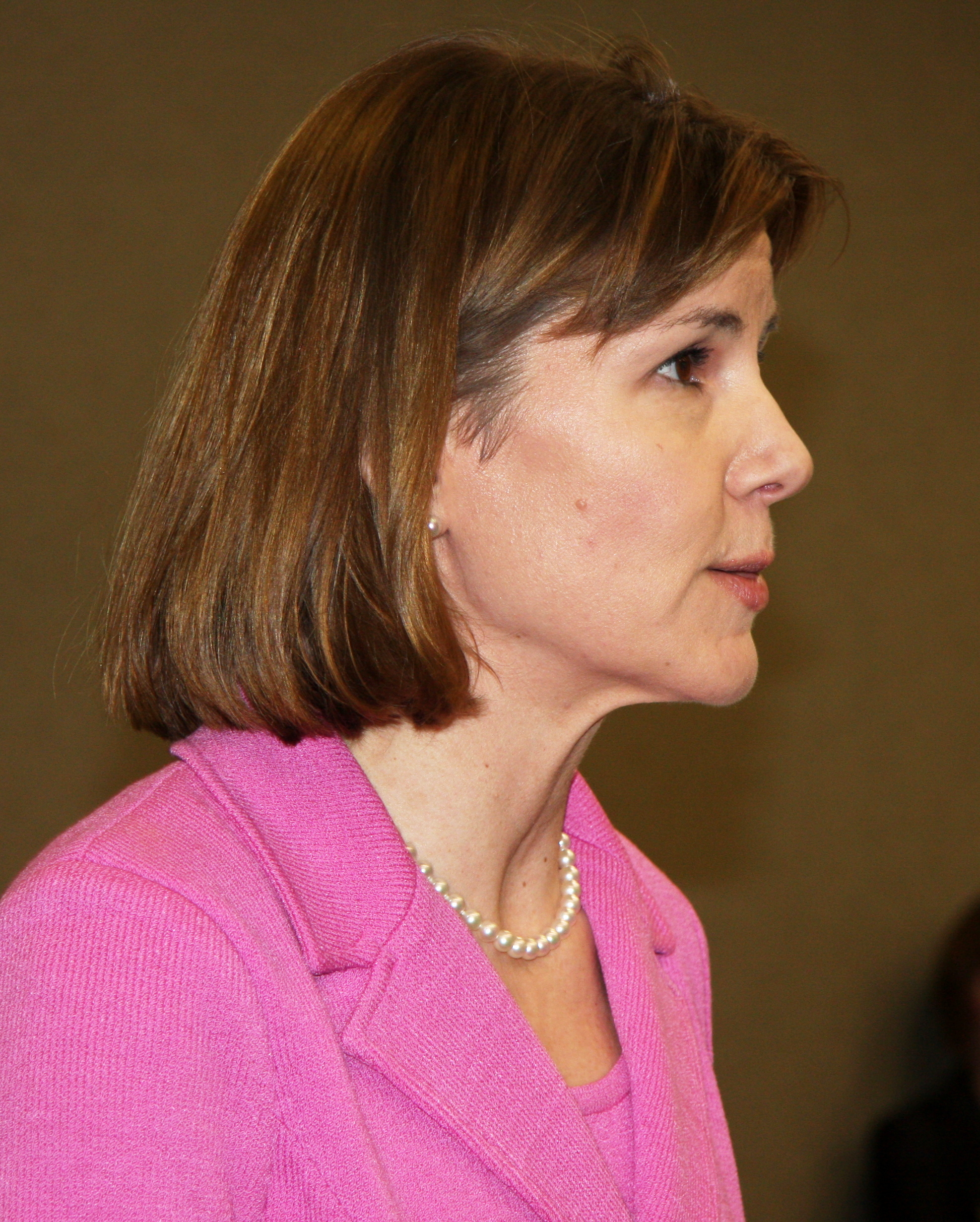
Swanson in 2014

In 2013 and 2014 Swanson took on for-profit colleges. Pointing out that over 70% of graduates of for-profit colleges earn less than high school drop outs, Swanson took action against colleges who misrepresented job placement rates, who steered students to high interest rates loans, and who misrepresented the transferability of credits to other institutions. In November, 2013 Swanson reached a settlement that required a for-profit college to make restitution to students whom it enrolled in a medical assisting degree program costing over $30,000 that wasn't properly accredited to train medical assistants to work for Minnesota employers. In September, 2016 the district court in Hennepin County ruled that another for-profit college sued by Swanson violated the consumer fraud laws by enrolling students who wanted to become police officers in a criminal justice program that was not certified by the state to train police officers. In July, 2017 the Minnesota Supreme Court found in Swanson's lawsuit that the school made illegal usurious loans to students at interest rates as high as 18 percent. In 2015, Swanson became one of the first attorneys general in the country to file lawsuits against student loan assistance companies that charged students thousands of dollars for bogus help in supposedly alleviating student loan debt.

In 2014, Swanson issued a scathing report on charities that contract with Savers, Inc., a for profit company that collects and sells second hand clothing through the United States and Canada. Swanson said that the charities and Savers were engaged in deceptive activities because the charities received only a few pennies in exchange for the dollars received by Savers for the sale of donated clothing. Swanson settled the matter in 2015 when Savers agreed to disclose that it is a for-profit company, that it will no longer commingle goods donated to specific charities, that it will disclose the amount of the revenue it receives which is donated to charity, that it will compensate charities for non-clothing items donated to the charity, and that it pay $1.8 million to the charities it serviced in the state of Minnesota.

In 2014 Swanson was re-elected attorney general, winning seven of the eight Congressional Districts in Minnesota. She won with 52.6% of the vote, beating Republican Scott Newman's 39%.

=== 2015–2019: Third term ===
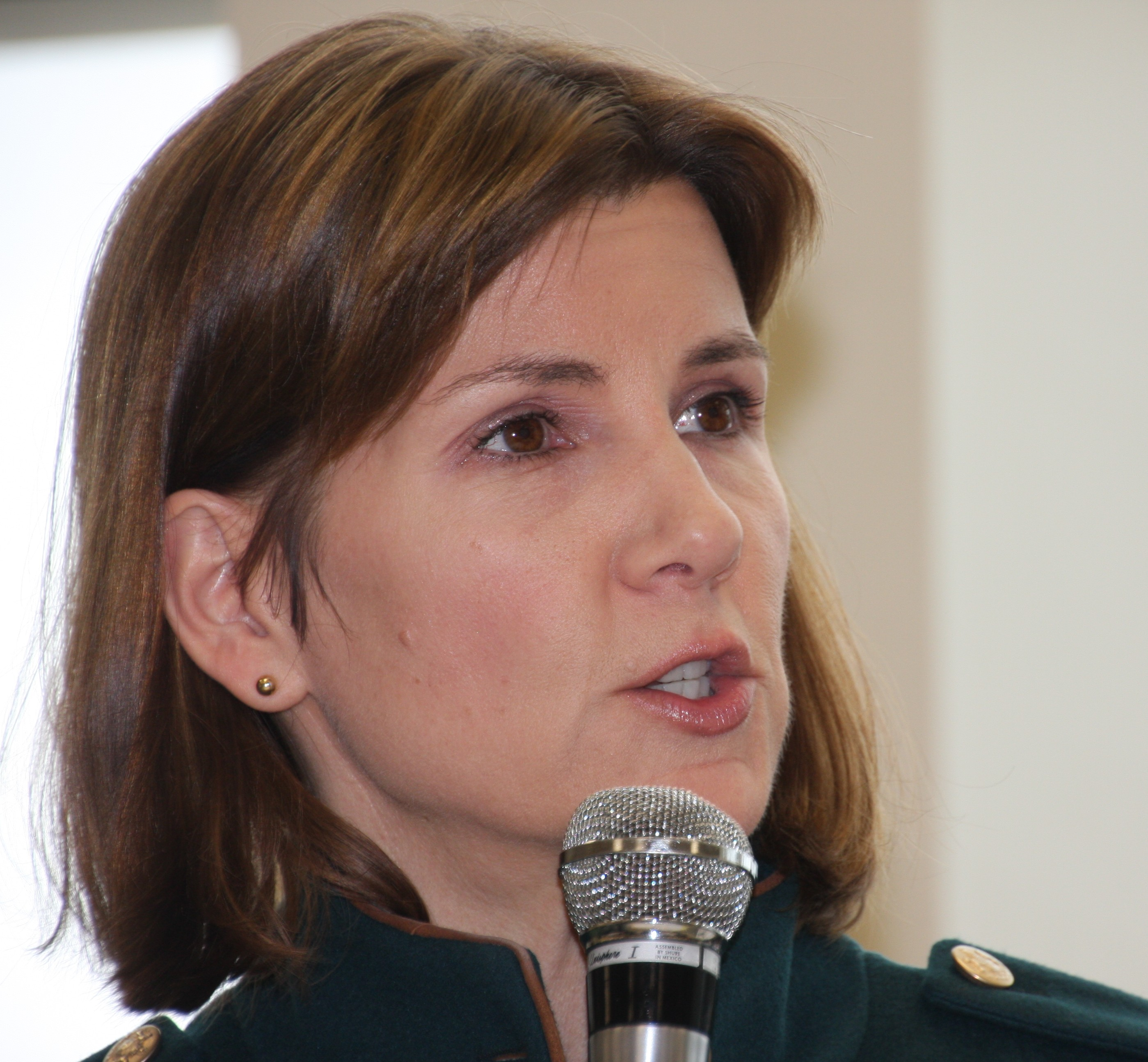
Swanson in 2016

Swanson was active in pharmaceutical litigation. In June 2016, she secured a $10.3 million recovery from Wyeth Pharmaceutical for failing to properly issue rebates to the state. In September 2016, Swanson sued Indivior PLC, a manufacturer of the opioid withdrawal medicine Suboxone, for unlawfully keeping out generic competition by tweaking the drug's structure to obtain a separate patent. She also wrote to insurance companies that month asking them to remove pre-authorization approval barriers to prevent or delay patients from getting access to opioid withdrawal treatment. In November 2016, Swanson issued a report on the opioid epidemic, calling for legislative and regulatory reforms as it relates to protocols on prescribing pain killers. The Report received 2017 Notable Mention Award from the National Council of State Legislatures. In December, 2016, she filed an antitrust lawsuit against six major drug manufactures alleging they colluded to fix the prices of generic prescription drugs for widely used diabetes, antibiotic, and other medicines. The lawsuit said that a significant player in the litigation was a salesperson based in Minnesota. In June 2017, Swanson opened an investigation concerning the role of pharmaceutical manufacturers in the opioid epidemic. In May 2018, Swanson sued Insys Therapeutics for deceptive marketing of Subsys, a fentanyl painkiller. In October 2017, Swanson expanded her lawsuit against generic drug companies for fixing the prices of popular medicines by naming a dozen more companies. In July 2018, Swanson filed sued against Purdue Pharma, claiming that it misrepresented the addictive nature of OxyContin.

Swanson has also been active in cases involving deceptive practices aimed at senior citizens. She obtained a $7 million judgment against a company that sold living trusts to senior citizens as a guise to sell them insurance products. In 2014, she filed a lawsuit against another company that sold “estate plans” to senior citizens costing $2,000 that it falsely claimed were prepared by an attorney. Swanson filed several lawsuits against outfits that bilked senior citizens with the sale of coins that were overpriced or not delivered. Swanson then worked with the legislature to secure enactment of legislation to curb abuses within the industry.

Swanson also brought a number of cases on behalf of patients who were harmed by various health care practices besides those listed above. In 2009, she filed a lawsuit against a major hospital system for charging 18 percent interest on unpaid medical bills in violation of Minnesota usury laws. The hospital settled with Swanson by agreeing to make over $1 million in refunds to patients. In 2007, 2012, and 2017, she renewed agreements first reached by her predecessor in 2005 with all Minnesota hospitals to reform the manner in which they collect unpaid medical bills and charge uninsured patients. In 2009 she took action against medical providers for signing patients up for health care credit cards without their permission and placing thousands of dollars in debt on the credit cards. In 2009 and 2010 Swanson sued several companies that sold phony health insurance coverage to uninsured patients. In 2013, Swanson intervened to assist rural critical access hospitals after a large insurance company cut their contract payments. Also in 2013, Swanson asked the Centers for Medicare and Medicaid Services to investigate a large insurer that sold Medicare policies after receiving complaints about shoddy payment practices. In 2016, Swanson required Minnesota hospitals to refund rape survivors who were improperly charged for sexual assault exams. In 2017, after the Minnesota Legislature authorized for-profit HMOs do business in Minnesota, Swanson sounded the alarm about the need to protect the nonprofit assets held by Minnesota HMOs from being acquired by for-profit companies. After Swanson pushed for legislation to regulate such nonprofit conversions, the legislature enacted a two-year moratorium on such transactions. In 2017 Swanson intervened after the state's largest insurance company and children's hospital failed to agreeing on a contract, bringing the two chief executive officers together to help forge a solution that would ensure continuity of care for 60,000 child patients. In 2018 Swanson filed a lawsuit against the federal government for cutting over $100 million in year in funding for MinnesotaCare, the state's 25 year old bipartisan health care program for the working poor.

During her tenure as attorney general, Swanson received recognition for bringing a number of cases to hold bill collectors and predatory lenders accountable for unlawful collection practices or other illegal practices. She brought the first lawsuit by a regulator in the country against one of the nation's largest collection agencies for “robo-signing” thousands of legal documents without verifying their accuracy. The alleged debts were often 10 years old or more and brought against people who did not owe the money. In a settlement with Swanson's office, the company agreed to reform its practices and substantiate that debts were owed before filing collection lawsuits. Swanson later got enacted bipartisan legislation that required debt buyers to provide evidence they are targeting the correct person in the right amount before filing collection lawsuits. Swanson also got millions of dollars of bills written off after suing a Minnesota collection company that added 22 percent interest to old bank overdraft fees. In 2017, she sued an outfit that got senior citizens to sign over large portions of their future pensions at high costs for military benefits in exchange for small loans. Starting in 2011, Swanson filed suit against many online “payday” lenders for making high-cost unlicensed loans to Minnesota residents, winning an $11 million settlement against one such company in 2016. In 2015 Swanson secured a favorable ruling from the Minnesota Supreme Court that Minnesota lending laws apply to online lenders against a lender that claimed that the Dormant Commerce Clause of the United States Constitution prohibited the application of such laws.

On February 1, 2017, Swanson joined the attorneys general of the states of Washington, New York, Virginia, and Massachusetts in bringing a lawsuit against the administration of President Donald Trump. The suit challenged the president's executive order that bans refugees and travelers from a list of predominantly Muslim nations from entering the United States. The suit alleges that the order is unconstitutional and should not be enforced. Swanson issued a statement saying restricting people from certain countries "does not pass constitutional muster, is inconsistent with our history as a nation, and undermines our national security."

In February 2018, Swanson reached a settlement of a major environmental lawsuit she filed in 2010 against 3M Company over its disposal of chemicals for several decades into the drinking water in the east metropolitan area of the Twin Cities. The lawsuit was settled for $850 million, or 100 times more than the next biggest environmental settlement in Minnesota history. Under the court-approved settlement, the money was to be used to clean up the drinking water.

On June 2, 2018, Swanson withdrew from seeking the DFL endorsement for attorney general despite receiving 52% of the endorsement vote in the first round of balloting (with 60% required for endorsement). Her opponent, Matt Pelikan, had received 47% in the first round of balloting. After her withdrawal, Pelikan was endorsed as the DFL candidate for attorney general.

== Awards and honors ==
Swanson was named one of the "Top Ten Lawyers in America" by the national publication Lawyers USA in 2009. In December, 2012 Health Leaders Magazine named Swanson one of 20 Americans who is making a difference in health care. She also received the Robert Drinan "Champion of Justice" award from the National Consumer Law Center, a Washington-based non-profit organization that acts as a national clearing center and publisher for consumer lawyers and other legal advocates. She was also a recipient of the Pro Patria award by the Department of Defense for her work on behalf of armed service personnel. In 2010, Swanson was named Public Official of the Year by the Minnesota Nurses Association. The Drum Major Institute of New York designated Swanson's predatory mortgage legislation on one of the ten top public policies proposed in 2008. In 2014, the University of Wisconsin-Madison School of Journalism awarded Swanson the Distinguished Service Award.

== Electoral history ==
=== 2006 ===
2006 DFL Primary Election for Minnesota Attorney General
Party	Candidate	Votes	%
Democratic (DFL)	Lori Swanson	125,412	41.75%
Democratic (DFL)	Steve Kelley	112,150	37.34%
Democratic (DFL)	Bill Luther	62,825	20.91%
Total votes		300,387	100%

2006 General Election for Minnesota Attorney General
Party	Candidate	Votes	%
Democratic (DFL)	Lori Swanson	1,131,474	53.24%
Republican	Jeff Johnson	865,465	40.72%
Independence	John James	86,032	4.05%
Green	Papa John Kolstad	41,000	1.93%
Write-in		1,238	0.06%
Total votes		2,125,209	100%

=== 2010 ===
2010 DFL Primary Election for Minnesota Attorney General
Party	Candidate	Votes	%
Democratic (DFL)	Lori Swanson (incumbent)	340,160	85.61%
Democratic (DFL)	Leo F. Meyer	57,157	14.39%
Total votes		397,317	100%

2010 General Election for Minnesota Attorney General
Party	Candidate	Votes	%
Democratic (DFL)	Lori Swanson (incumbent)	1,075,536	52.90%
Republican	Christopher Barden	839,033	41.29%
Independence	Bill Dahn	102,865	5.06%
The Resource Party	David J. Hoch	14,040	0.69%
Write-in		1,613	0.08%
Total votes		2,033,087	100%

=== 2014 ===
2014 DFL Primary Election for Minnesota Attorney General
Party	Candidate	Votes	%
Democratic (DFL)	Lori Swanson (incumbent)	174,119	100%
Total votes		174,119	100%

2014 General Election for Minnesota Attorney General
Party	Candidate	Votes	%
Democratic (DFL)	Lori Swanson (incumbent)	1,014,714	52.60%
Republican	Scott Newman	752,543	39.01%
Legal Marijuana Now	Dan R. Vacek	57,604	2.99%
Independence	Brandan Borgos	44,613	2.31%
Libertarian	Mary O'Connor	30,008	1.56%
Green	Andy Dawkins	28,748	1.49%
Write-in		750	0.04%
Total votes		1,928,980	100%

=== 2018 ===
2018 DFL Primary Election for Minnesota Governor
Party	Candidate	Votes	%
Democratic (DFL)	Tim Walz	242,832	41.60%
Democratic (DFL)	Erin Murphy	186,969	32.03%
Democratic (DFL)	Lori Swanson	143,517	24.59%
Democratic (DFL)	Tim Holden	6,398	1.10%
Democratic (DFL)	Olé Savior	4,019	0.69%
Total votes		583,735	100%

== See also ==
- Politics of Minnesota
- List of female state attorneys general in the United States

Party political offices
Preceded by Mike Hatch	Democratic nominee for Attorney General of Minnesota; 2006, 2010, 2014	Succeeded by Keith Ellison
Legal offices
Preceded by Mike Hatch	Attorney General of Minnesota; 2007–2019	Succeeded by Keith Ellison
