= 2014 Minnesota Attorney General election =

- November 4, 2014
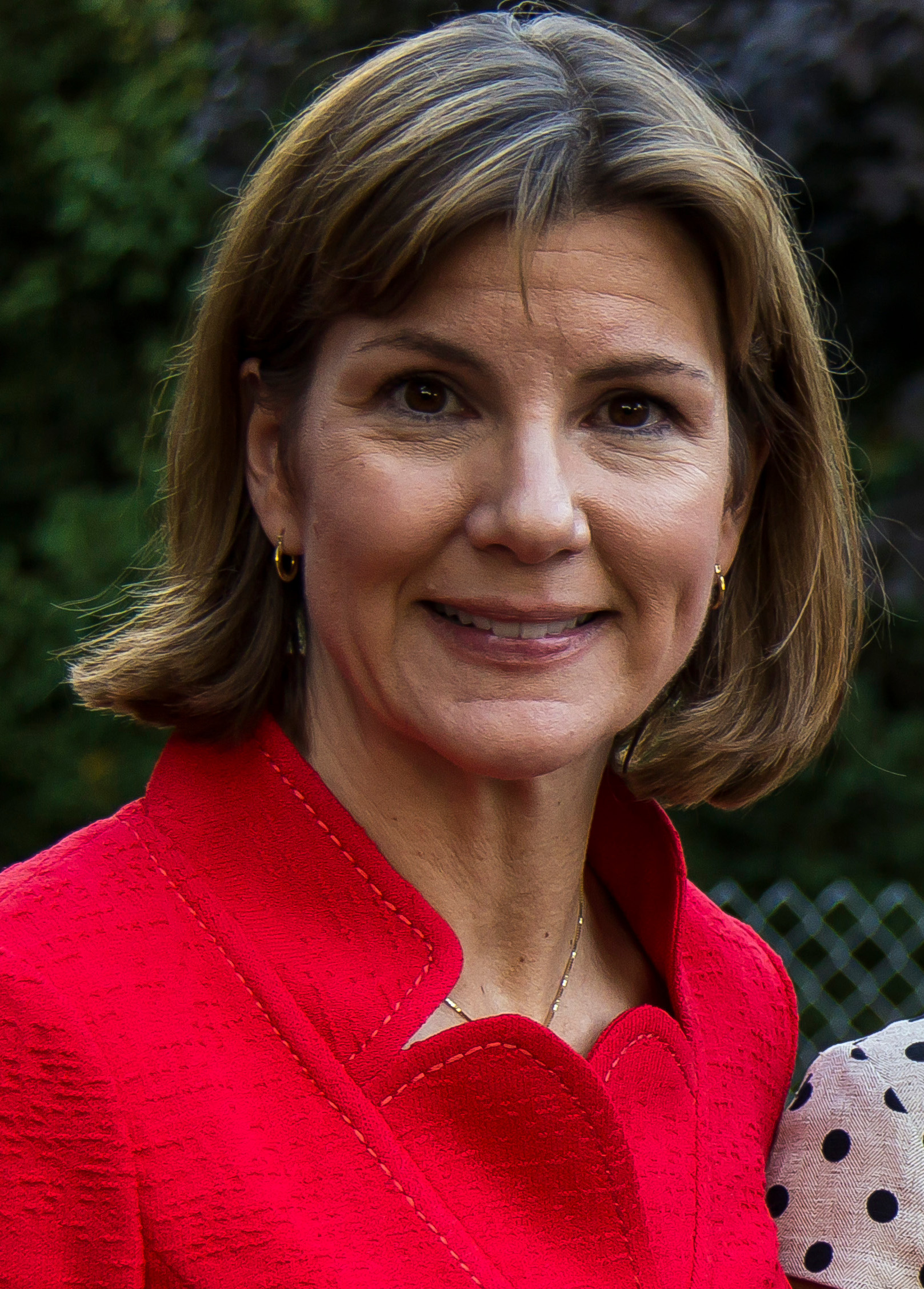

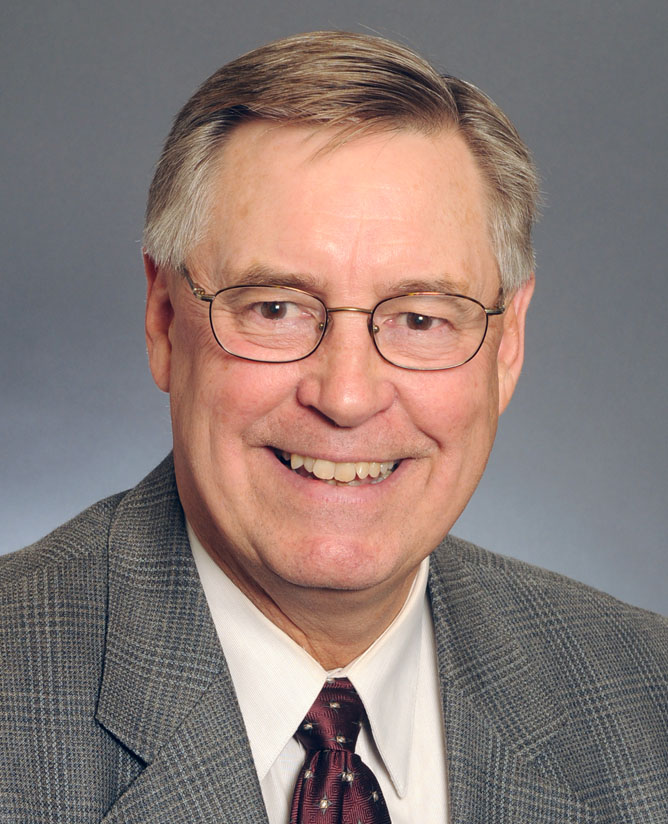
Nominee	Lori Swanson	Scott Newman
Party	Democratic (DFL)	Republican
Popular vote	1,014,714	752,543
Percentage	52.6%	39.0%
- Swanson: 30–40% 40–50% 50–60% 60–70% 70–80% 80–90% >90% Newman: 40–50% 50–60% 60–70% 70–80% 80–90% >90% O'Connor: 30–40% Tie: 30–40% 40–50% 50% No votes
Attorney General before election
Lori Swanson
Democratic (DFL)
Elected Attorney General
Lori Swanson
Democratic (DFL)

The 2014 Minnesota Attorney General election was held on November 4, 2014, to elect the Minnesota Attorney General.

Incumbent Democratic–Farmer–Labor Attorney General Lori Swanson ran for re-election to a third term in office. Primary elections were held on August 12, 2014. The Democratic–Farmer–Labor Party (DFL) renominated Swanson, the Republican Party nominated State Senator Scott Newman and the Independence Party nominated attorney Brandan Borgos.

Swanson defeated Newman in the general election by a significant margin.

== Democratic–Farmer–Labor primary ==
The Democratic–Farmer–Labor endorsement was made on May 31, 2014. Incumbent Lori Swanson won the endorsement unopposed.

=== Candidates ===
==== Nominee ====
- Lori Swanson, incumbent attorney general (party endorsed)

=== Results ===
Democratic primary election results
Party	Candidate	Votes	%
Democratic (DFL)	Lori Swanson (incumbent)	174,119	100
Total votes		174,119	100

== Republican primary ==
The Republican endorsement was made on May 30, 2014. State Senator Scott Newman won the endorsement unopposed.

=== Candidates ===
- Sharon Anderson, perennial candidate
- Scott Newman (party endorsed), state senator

=== Results ===
Republican primary election results
Party	Candidate	Votes	%
Republican	Scott Newman	103,933	63.24
Republican	Sharon Anderson	60,407	36.76
Total votes		164,340	100

== Independence nomination ==
The Independence Party endorsement was made on May 17, 2014. Brandan Borgos won the endorsement unopposed.

=== Candidates ===
==== Nominee ====
- Brandan Borgos, attorney (party endorsed)

=== Results ===
Independence primary election results
Party	Candidate	Votes	%
Independence	Brandan Borgos	5,632	100
Total votes		5,632	100

== General election ==
=== Candidates ===
- Lori Swanson (DFL), incumbent attorney general
- Scott Newman (Republican), state senator
- Brandan Borgos (Independence), state senator
- Mary O'Connor (Libertarian)
- Andy Dawkins (Green), former DFL state representative
- Dan Vacek (Independent, political principle: Legal Marijuana Now)

=== Polling ===
Hypothetical polling

Poll source	Date(s) administered	Sample size	Margin of error	Lori Swanson (DFL)	Sharon Anderson (R)	Brandan Borgos (IP)	Andy Dawkins (G)
Gravis Marketing	July 2–3, 2014	879	± 3%	49%	36%	8%	7%

=== Results ===
Minnesota Attorney General election, 2014
Party	Candidate	Votes	%	±%
Democratic (DFL)	Lori Swanson (incumbent)	1,014,714	52.60%	−0.30%
Republican	Scott Newman	752,543	39.01%	−2.26%
Legal Marijuana Now	Dan Vacek	57,604	2.99%	N/A
Independence	Brandon Borgos	44,613	2.31%	−2.75%
Libertarian	Mary O'Connor	30,008	1.56%	N/A
Green	Andy Dawkins	28,748	1.49%	N/A
Write-in		750	0.04%	-0.04%
Total votes		1,898,972	100.0%	
Democratic (DFL) hold				

=== Results by congressional district ===
Swanson won seven of eight congressional districts, including two that elected Republicans.

District	Swanson	Newman	Representative
1st	48%	43%	Tim Walz
2nd	50%	42%	John Kline
3rd	50%	44%	Erik Paulsen
4th	60%	31%	Betty McCollum
5th	69%	20%	Keith Ellison
6th	44%	48%	Tom Emmer
7th	46.0%	45.9%	Collin Peterson
8th	54%	38%	Rick Nolan

== See also ==
- Minnesota elections, 2014
