= Steve Kelley (politician) =

American politician (born 1953)

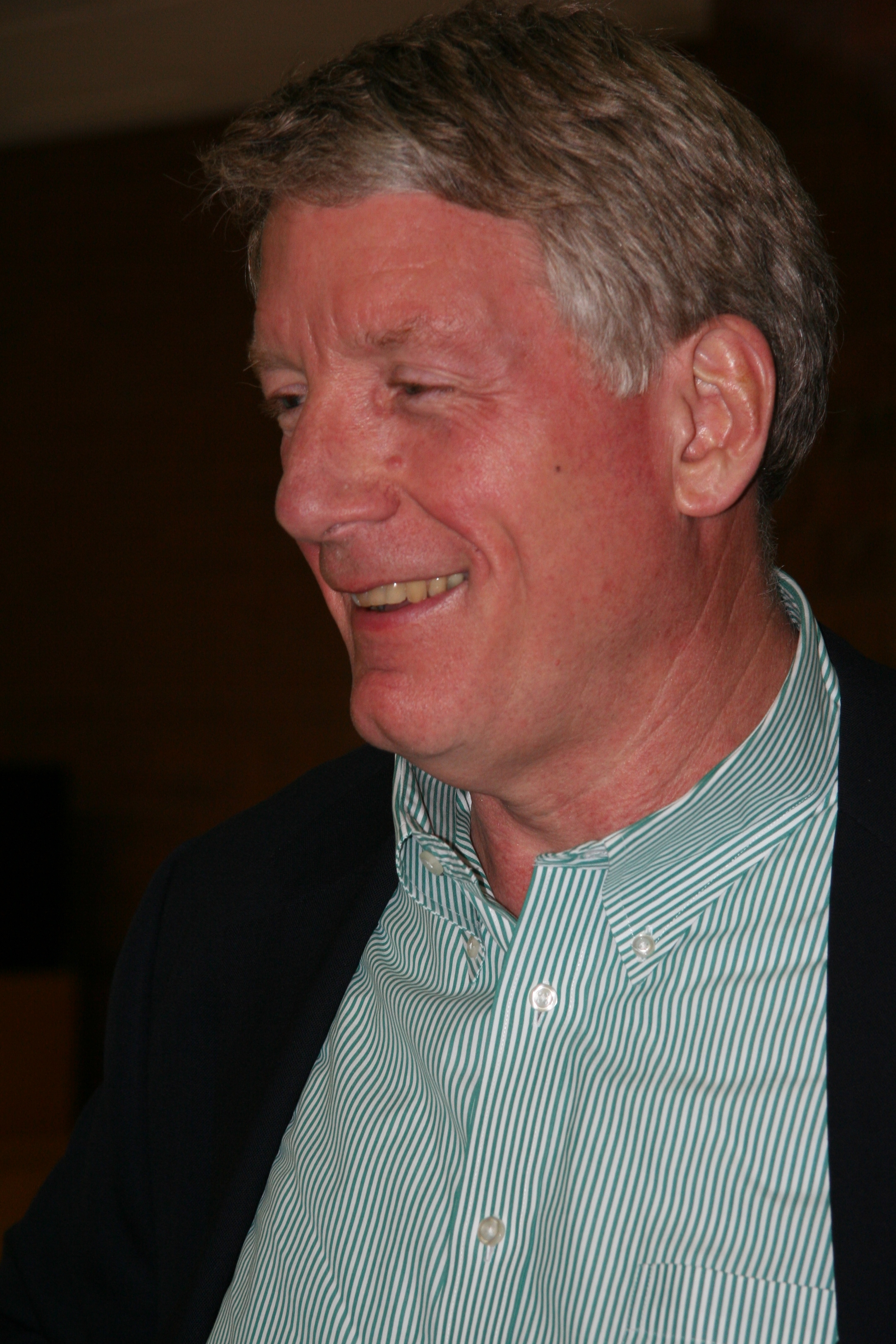
- Steve Kelley in 2009

Member of the Minnesota Senate from the 44th district
- In office January 7, 1997 – January 2, 2007
- Preceded by: Ted Mondale
- Succeeded by: Ron Latz

Member of the Minnesota House of Representatives from the 44A district
- In office January 4, 1993 – January 5, 1997
- Preceded by: Sally Olsen
- Succeeded by: Betty Folliard

Personal details
- Born: January 8, 1953 (age 73)
- Party: Democratic (DFL)
- Spouse: Sophie Kelley
- Children: 2
- Education: Williams College (BA); Columbia University (JD)

Steve Kelley (born January 8, 1953) is a former Minnesota state Senator. In 2006, he received the Democratic-Farmer-Labor endorsement for Attorney General. Kelley served in the Minnesota Senate from 1997 to 2007; he previously served in the Minnesota House of Representatives from 1993 to 1997. He is currently a Senior Fellow at the Humphrey Institute of Public Affairs at the University of Minnesota, the director of the school's Master of Public Affairs program, and the Deputy Director of the Center for Integrative Leadership. Kelley ran for Governor of Minnesota in 2006 and 2010 and Attorney General in 2006.

For a time, Kelley was the Director of Graduate Studies (DGS) for the Master of Science in Security Technologies graduate program at the Technological Leadership Institute (University of Minnesota - College of Science and Engineering). While serving in the Minnesota Senate, Kelley was a proponent of a new stadium deal for the Minnesota Twins, and was a principal sponsor of the controversial 0.15 percent sales tax increase in Hennepin County, the proceeds of which will be used to fund approximately three-fourths of the projected cost of the new ballpark in addition to a number of transit projects in the metro area.

Kelley received his B.A. from Williams College and his J.D. from the Columbia Law School.

In early 2007, Kelley joined the Blandin Foundation Broadband Strategy Board, which is working towards a broadband vision for Minnesota: To ensure a high quality of life and a globally competitive future for its citizens, businesses and communities, Minnesota is committed to making the necessary investment to become a world leader in the universal deployment and use of ultra high-speed next generation broadband.

He is married to Sophie Kelley and has two adult children.

== Electoral history ==
- 2006 Race for state Attorney General - Democratic Primary
  - Lori Swanson (DFL), 42%
  - Steve Kelley (DFL), 37%
  - Bill Luther (DFL), 21%

== See also ==
- Minnesota gubernatorial election, 2010#Announced 2.
