= 2010 Minnesota Attorney General election =

- November 2, 2010
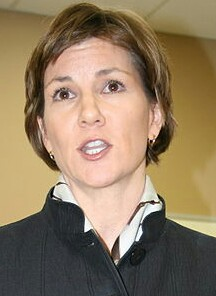

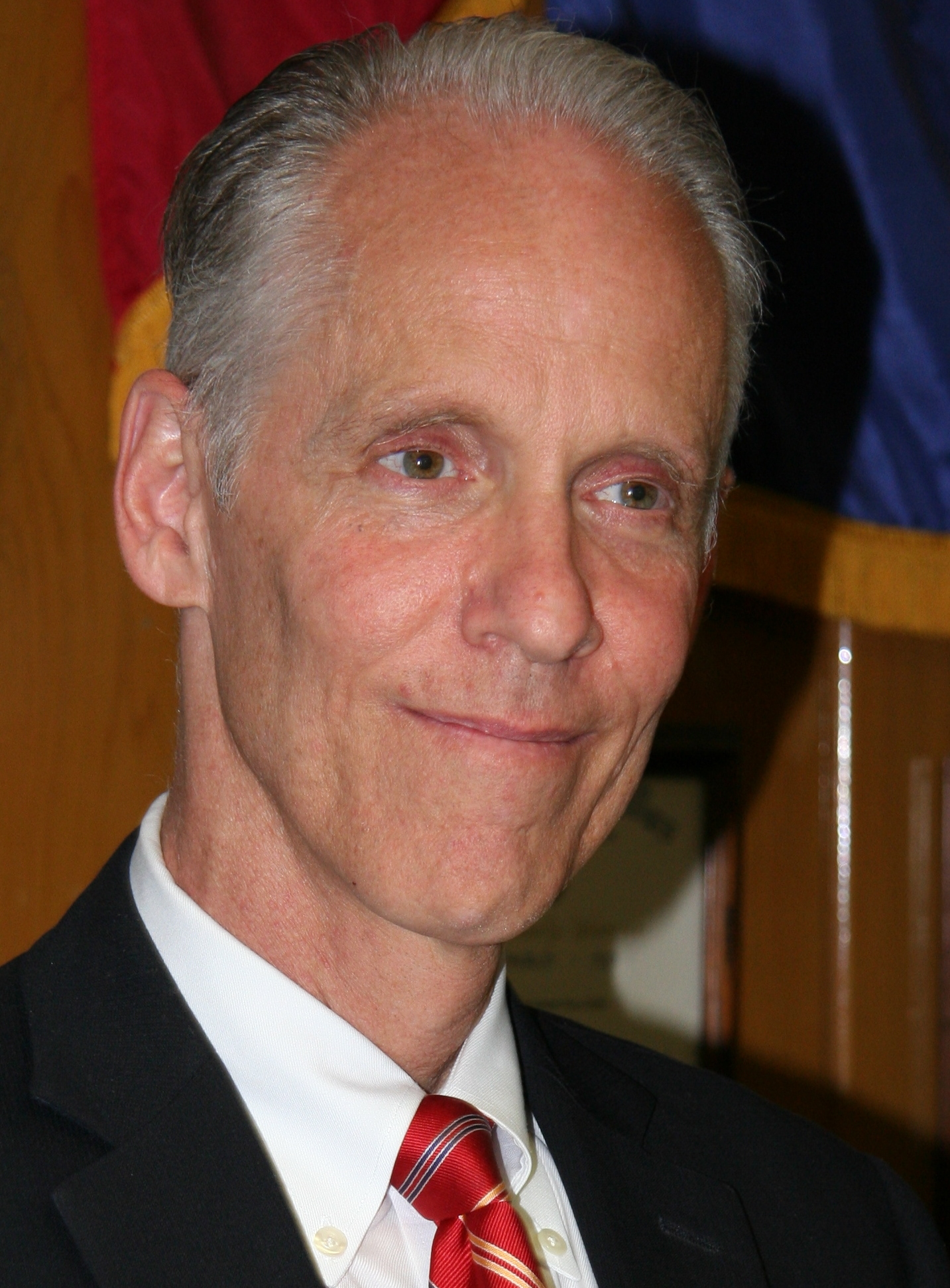

Nominee	Lori Swanson	Chris Barden	Bill Dahn
Party	Democratic (DFL)	Republican	Independence
Popular vote	1,075,536	839,033	102,865
Percentage	52.9%	41.3%	5.06%
- Swanson: 40–50% 50–60% 60–70% 70–80% 80–90% >90% Barden: 40–50% 50–60% 60–70% 70–80% 80–90% >90% Dahn: 30–40% Tie: 30–40% 40–50% 50% No votes
Attorney General before election
Lori Swanson
Democratic (DFL)
Elected Attorney General
Lori Swanson
Democratic (DFL)

The 2010 Minnesota Attorney General election was held on Tuesday, November 2, 2010, to elect the Minnesota Attorney General for a four-year term. Primary elections were held on August 10, 2010. Incumbent Lori Swanson of the Minnesota Democratic–Farmer–Labor Party (DFL) won reelection to a second term.

== Candidates ==
=== Democratic–Farmer–Labor Party ===
Incumbent Lori Swanson won endorsement at the Minnesota Democratic–Farmer–Labor Party (DFL) convention. She faced only token opposition in her party's primary from Leo F. Meyer, and easily won her party's nomination in the August 10 primary.

=== Republican Party ===
Edina attorney and psychologist Chris Barden earned the endorsement of the Republican Party of Minnesota at its state convention. He was challenged in his party's primary by Sharon Anderson, a perennial candidate who won her party's endorsement for attorney general in 1994. In the August 10 primary, Barden earned 54% of the vote to defeat Anderson and earn his party's nomination.

=== Independence Party ===
Activist Bill Dahn, who has no formal legal education, was the only candidate seeking the office of Attorney General as a member of the Independence Party of Minnesota.

=== Resource Party ===
Activist David J. Hoch ran in the election for the Resource Party.

== Results ==
Candidate	Party	Votes	
Candidate	Party	#	%
Lori Swanson	Democratic–Farmer–Labor	1,075,536	52.90
Chris Barden	Republican	839,033	41.27
Bill Dahn	Independence	102,865	5.06
David J. Hoch	Resource Party	14,040	0.69
Write-in	—	1,613	0.08
Total		2,033,087	100.00
Valid votes		2,033,087	95.75
Blank votes		90,282	4.25
Turnout		2,123,369	55.81
Eligible voters		3,804,746	

Source: Minnesota Secretary of State
