= 2006 Minnesota Attorney General election =

- November 7, 2006
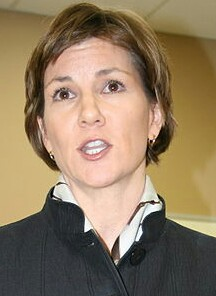

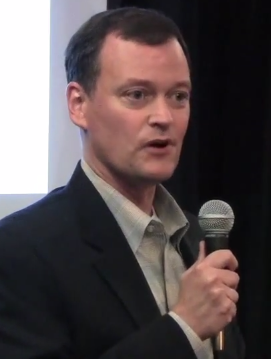
Nominee	Lori Swanson	Jeff Johnson
Party	Democratic (DFL)	Republican
Popular vote	1,131,474	865,465
Percentage	53.2%	40.7%
- Swanson: 40–50% 50–60% 60–70% 70–80% 80–90% >90% Johnson: 40–50% 50–60% 60–70% 70–80% 80–90% >90% James: >90% Tie: 30–40% 40–50% 50% No votes
Attorney General before election
Mike Hatch
Democratic (DFL)
Elected Attorney General
Lori Swanson
Democratic (DFL)

The 2006 Minnesota Attorney General election was held on Tuesday, November 7, 2006 to elect the Minnesota attorney general for a four-year term. DFL incumbent Mike Hatch chose to run for governor instead of reelection. Lori Swanson of the Minnesota Democratic–Farmer–Labor Party (DFL) won election to her first term.

== Candidates ==
=== Democratic–Farmer–Labor Party ===
Former deputy attorney general Lori Swanson won the DFL nomination.

State Senator Steve Kelley, House Minority Leader Matt Entenza, and former U.S. Representative Bill Luther all ran unsuccessfully for the DFL nomination.

=== Republican Party ===
State Representative and Assistant Majority Leader Jeff Johnson won the Republican nomination.

=== Independence Party ===
Attorney and former revenue commissioner John James was the Independence Party nominee.

=== Green Party ===
Musician Papa John Kolstad was the Green Party nominee.

== Results ==
Candidate	Party	Votes	
Candidate	Party	#	%
Lori Swanson	Democratic–Farmer–Labor	1,131,474	53.24
Jeff Johnson	Republican	865,465	40.72
John James	Independence	86,032	4.05
Papa John Kolstad	Green	31,000	1.93
Write-in	—	1,236	0.06
Total			100.00
Turnout		2,217,818	60.47
Eligible voters		3,667,707	-

Source: Minnesota Secretary of State
