= United Union of Roofers, Waterproofers and Allied Workers =

Union of roofers and waterproofing workers, in Washington, D.C., USA

- United Union of Roofers, Waterproofers and Allied Workers
- Predecessor: International Slate and Tile Roofers Union of America; International Brotherhood of Composition Roofers, Damp and Waterproof Workers
- Founded: 1919 (UURWAW since 1978)
- Headquarters: Washington, D.C.
- Location: United States
- Members: 18,780 ("regular" members); 3,579 ("superannuated" members) (2018)
- Key people: James A. Hadel, International President; Mitch Terhaar, International Secretary-Treasurer
- Affiliations: AFL–CIO, NABTU
- Website: unionroofers.com
- Formerly called: United Slate, Tile and Composition Roofers, Damp and Waterproof Workers Association

The United Union of Roofers, Waterproofers and Allied Workers (UURWAW or RWAW) is a union of roofers and waterproofing personnel, headquartered in Washington, D.C. As of 2008, the union has approximately 22,000 members organized into nine district councils across the United States.

== History ==
The current union has its roots in two separate predecessor organizations: the International Slate and Tile Roofers Union of America, which was chartered by the American Federation of Labor in 1903, and the International Brotherhood of Composition Roofers, Damp and Waterproof Workers, which was chartered by the AFL in 1906. The two groups merged in 1919 to form the United Slate, Tile and Composition Roofers, Damp and Waterproof Workers Association. The union changed to its current name in 1978.

== Presidents ==
1919: George W. Jones
1942: Charles D. Aquadro
1973: Roy E. Johnson
1985: Joseph A. Wiederkehr
1985: Earl Kruse
2003: John Martini
2006: Kinsey Robinson
2022: James A. Hadel
