= Christopher Barden =

American psychologist

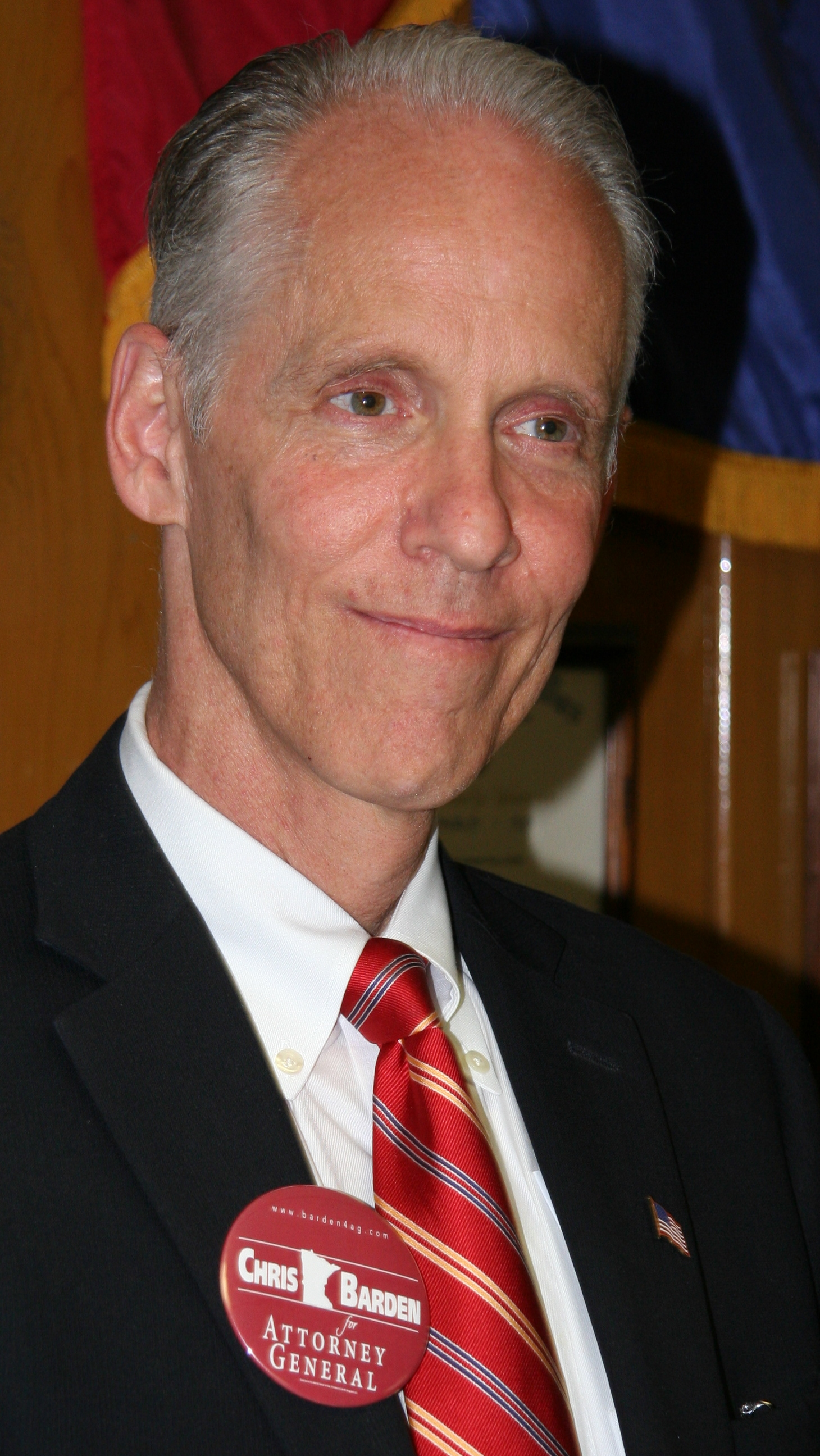
- Christopher Barden
- Education: University of Minnesota; Harvard Law School; Stanford Medical School
- Occupations: Lawyer and Psychologist

R. Christopher Barden Ph.D., J.D., L.P. is an American lawyer and psychologist.

Barden has participated as an attorney or consultant in lawsuits against "recovered memory" therapists. A amicus curiae brief to the California Supreme Court drafted by Barden and signed by nearly 100 international experts in the field of human memory emphasized there is no credible scientific support for the notions of repressed and recovered memories.

In the 1990s, Barden sued therapists who facilitated the development of multiple personality disorder and false memories in clients. According to Mark Pendergrast, Barden "won multiple million-dollar judgments and settlements... against psychiatrists and other therapists who encouraged clients to believe that they housed destructive internal alters". Psychologist Richard McNally described Barden as "the man who did more than anyone to stop the madness of MPD".

Barden has degrees from University of Minnesota, Harvard Law School, and Stanford Medical School.

Barden was the Republican nominee for attorney general of Minnesota in the 2010 election. He was defeated by incumbent Democrat Lori Swanson.

Between 1995 and 2005, Barden served as the director of the National Association for Consumer Protection In Mental Health Practices.
