= 2002 United States House of Representatives elections in Minnesota =

- November 5, 2002

All 8 Minnesota seats to the United States House of Representatives
	Majority party	Minority party
Party	Democratic (DFL)	Republican
Last election	5 seats, 52.21%	3 seats, 42.02%
Seats before	5	3
Seats won	4	4
Seat change	▼1	▲1
Popular vote	1,097,911	1,029,612
Percentage	49.87%	46.76%
Swing	▼2.34%	▲4.74%

Democratic–Farmer–Labor
50–60%
60–70%
70–80%
80–90%
Republican
40–50%
50–60%
60–70%
70–80%

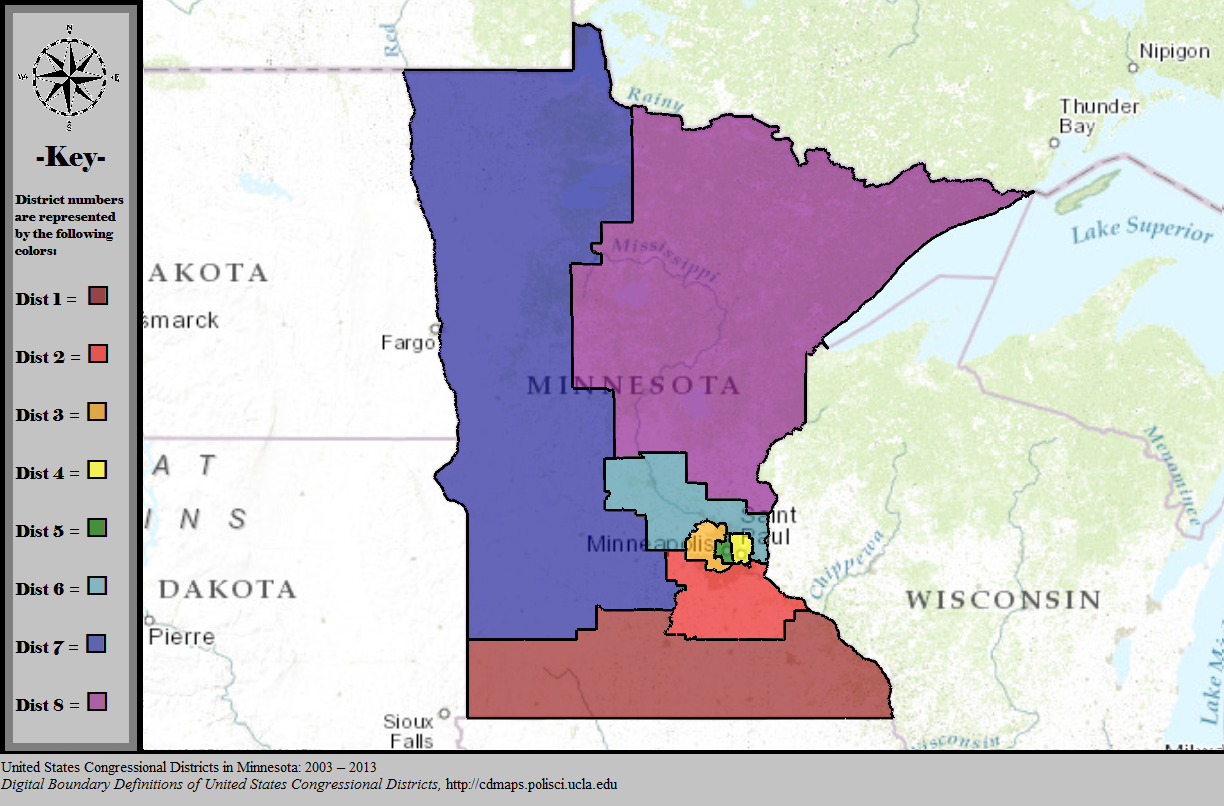
Map of Minnesota showing all eight districts, as apportioned for Representatives elected in the elections of 2002, 2004, 2006, 2008, and 2010

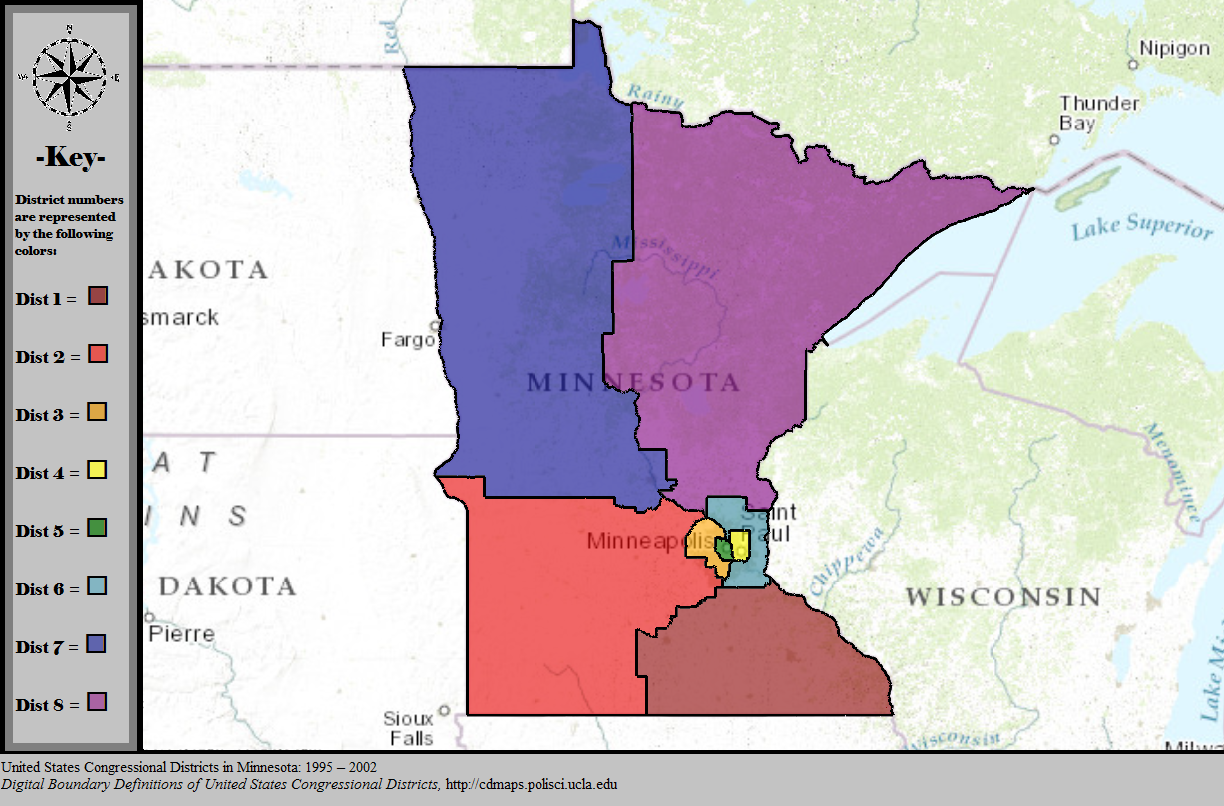
Map of Minnesota showing all eight districts, as apportioned for Representatives elected in the elections of 1994, 1996, 1998, and 2000

The 2002 congressional elections in Minnesota, were held on November 5, 2002, to determine who would represent the state, in the United States House of Representative.

Minnesota had eight seats in the House, and the 2002 congressional election was the first held pursuant to the apportionment made according to the 2000 United States census. Representatives are elected for two-year terms; those elected served in the 108th Congress from January 3, 2003, until January 3, 2005. The election coincided with a U.S. Senate election and a gubernatorial election. DFLer Bill Luther, formerly of the 6th congressional district, who was redistricted into the 2nd congressional district, was the only incumbent in Minnesota's House delegation who failed to win reelection.

== Overview ==
=== Statewide ===
Party	Candidates	Votes		Seats		
Party	Candidates	No.	%	No.	+/–	%
Democratic-Farmer-Labor	8	1,097,911	49.87	4	▼1	50.00
Republican	8	1,029,612	46.76	4	▲1	50.00
Green	3	37,708	1.71	0	Steady	0.0
Independence	1	21,484	0.98	0	Steady	0.0
Other	1	12,430	0.56	0	Steady	0.0
Write-in	8	2,493	0.11	0	Steady	0.0
Total	29	2,201,638	100.0	8	Steady	100.0

Popular vote
Democratic	49.87%
Republican	46.76%
Green	1.71%
Other	1.65%

House seats
Democratic	50.00%
Republican	50.00%

=== By district ===
Results of the 2002 United States House of Representatives elections in Minnesota by district:

District	Democratic		Republican		Others		Total		Result
District	Votes	%	Votes	%	Votes	%	Votes	%	Result
District 1	92,165	34.65%	163,570	61.50%	10,247	3.85%	265,982	100.0%	Republican hold
District 2	121,121	42.22%	152,970	53.33%	12,769	4.45%	286,860	100.0%	Republican hold
District 3	82,575	27.88%	213,334	72.02%	309	0.10%	296,218	100.0%	Republican hold
District 4	164,597	62.22%	89,705	33.91%	10,238	3.87%	264,540	100.0%	Democratic hold
District 5	171,572	67.03%	66,271	25.89%	18,139	7.09%	255,982	100.0%	Democratic hold
District 6	100,738	35.06%	164,747	57.34%	21,827	7.60%	287,312	100.0%	Republican gain
District 7	170,234	65.27%	90,342	34.64%	237	0.09%	260,813	100.0%	Democratic hold
District 8	194,909	68.65%	88,673	31.23%	349	0.12%	283,931	100.0%	Democratic hold
Total	1,097,911	49.87%	1,029,612	46.76%	74,115	3.37%	2,201,638	100.0%	

== District 1 ==
2002 Minnesota's 1st congressional district election
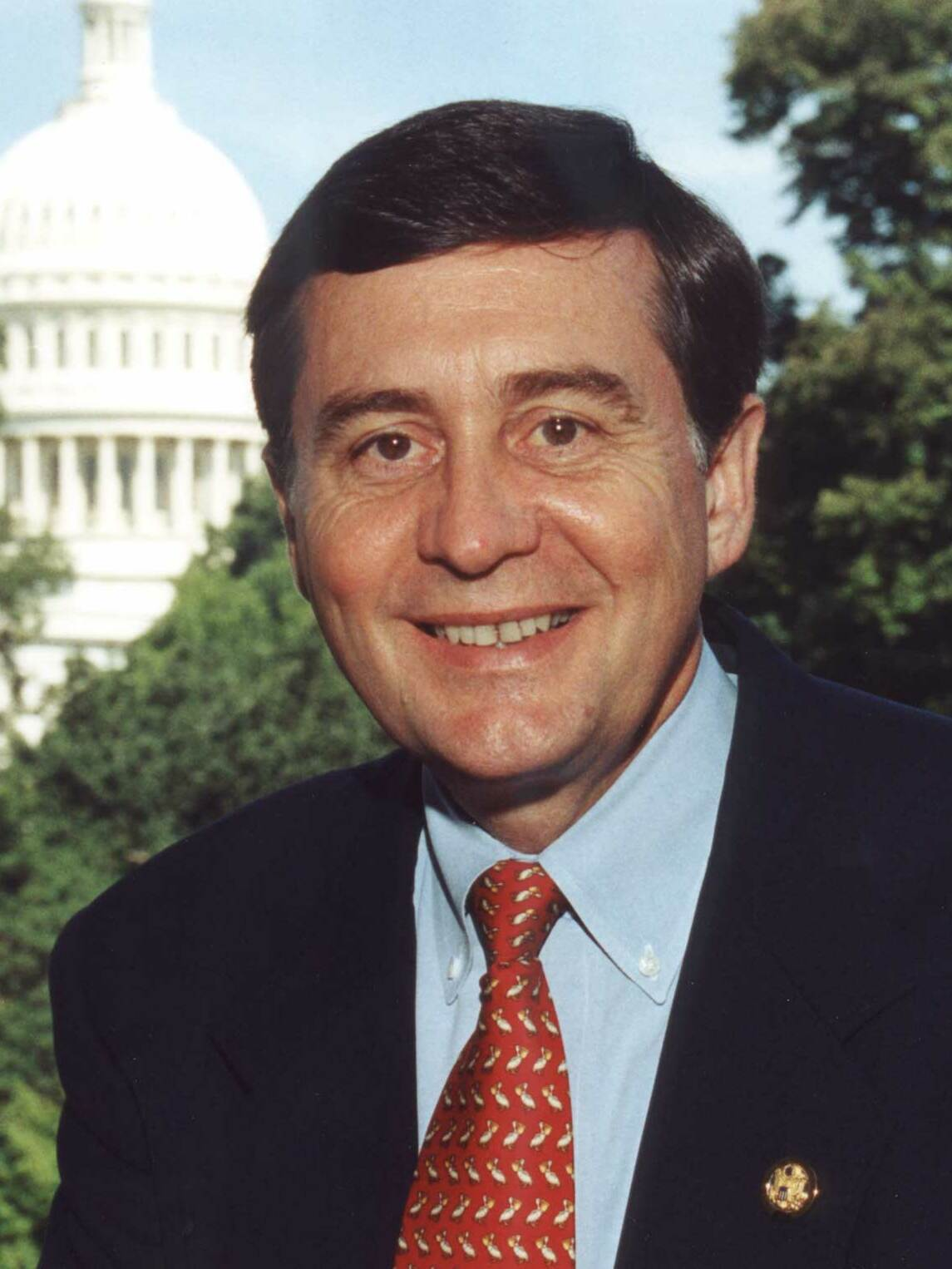

Nominee	Gil Gutknecht	Steve Andreasen
Party	Republican	Democratic (DFL)
Popular vote	163,570	92,165
Percentage	61.5%	34.7%
- Precinct results Gutknecht: 40–50% 50–60% 60–70% 70–80% 80–90% >90% Andreasen: 40–50% 50–60% 60–70% >90% Tie: 40–50%
U.S. Representative before election
Gil Gutknecht
Republican
Elected U.S. Representative
Gil Gutknecht
Republican

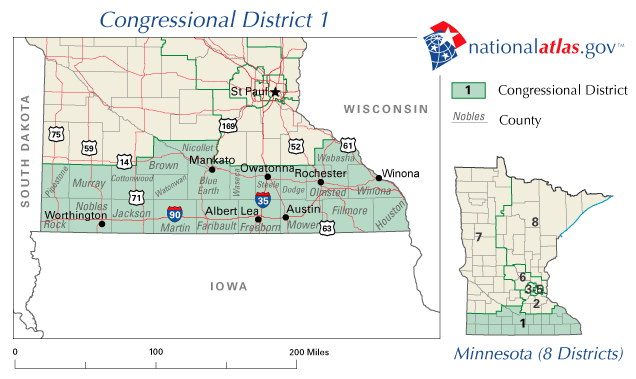

After redistricting the new 1st district was made of approximately 75% from the old 1st with 25% from the old 2nd. Incumbent Republican Gil Gutknecht, who had represented the district since 1995, ran for re-election. He was re-elected with 56.4% of the vote in 2000.

=== Republican primary ===
==== Candidates ====
===== Nominee =====
- Gil Gutknecht, incumbent U.S. Representative

==== Results ====
Republican Primary Election
Party	Candidate	Votes	%
Republican	Gil Gutknecht (Incumbent)	25,978	100.0
Total votes		25,978	100.0

=== DFL primary ===
==== Candidates ====
===== Nominee =====
- Steve Andreasen, former Director for Defense Policy and Arms Control on the U.S. National Security Council (1993–2001).

===== Withdrawn =====
- Todd Rasmussen, banker and Winona school board member

==== Results ====
Democratic–Farmer–Labor Primary Election
Party	Candidate	Votes	%
Democratic (DFL)	Steve Andreasen	19,394	100.0
Total votes		19,394	100.0

=== Green primary ===
==== Candidates ====
===== Nominee =====
- Gregory Mikkelson, small business owner and farmer

==== Results ====
Green Primary Election
Party	Candidate	Votes	%
Green	Gregory Mikkelson	467	100.0
Total votes		467	100.0

=== General election ===
==== Campaign ====
The major issues of the campaign included the Iraq War, agriculture, and medical care.

==== Predictions ====
Source	Ranking	As of
Sabato's Crystal Ball	Safe R	November 4, 2002
New York Times	Safe R	October 14, 2002

==== Results ====
Gutknecht easily won a fifth term, defeating second-place Pomeroy by a landslide 26.85 percent margin, as Mikkelson finished at a very distant third.

Minnesota's 1st Congressional district election, 2002
Party	Candidate	Votes	%
Republican	Gil Gutknecht (Incumbent)	163,570	61.5
Democratic (DFL)	Steve Andreasen	92,165	34.7
Green	Gregory Mikkelson	9,964	3.8
Write-in		283	0.1
Total votes		265,982	100.0
Republican hold			

==== Finances ====
Candidate (party)	Raised	Spent	Cash on hand
Gil Gutknecht (R)	$894,474	$770,207	$187,252
Steve Andreasen (DFL)	$123,540	$123,064	$477
Gregory Mikkelson (G)	$17,285	$16,761	$521

== District 2 ==
2002 Minnesota's 2nd congressional district election
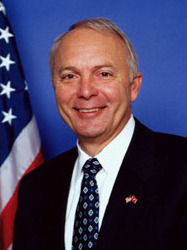

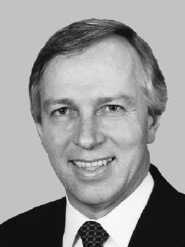
Nominee	John Kline	Bill Luther
Party	Republican	Democratic (DFL)
Popular vote	152,970	121,121
Percentage	53.3%	42.2%
- Precinct results Kline: 40–50% 50–60% 60–70% 70–80% Luther: 40–50% 50–60% 60–70% 70–80% Tie: 50%
U.S. Representative before election
Mark Kennedy
Republican
Elected U.S. Representative
John Kline
Republican

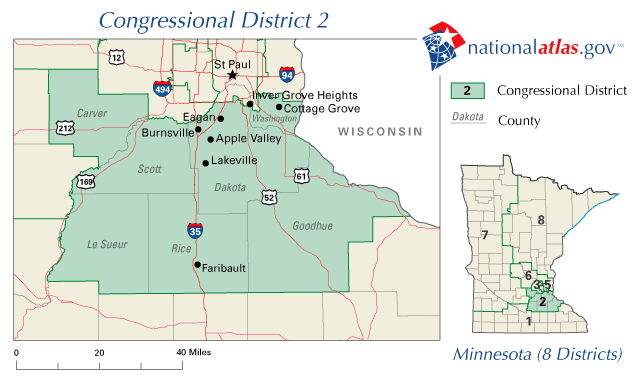

During the reapportionment that occurred in consequence of the 2000 United States census, the old 2nd district was broken up with the largest portion being transferred to the redrawn 7th. The new 2nd was based in the southern metro area and comprised approximately 41% from the old 6th, 22% from the old 2nd, 22% from the old 1st, 14% from the old 3rd and 1% from the old 4th.

Incumbent Republican Mark Kennedy, whose residence in Watertown remained in the 2nd decided to transfer to the new 6th.

Bill Luther, the incumbent Democrat from the old 6th district opted to transfer to the new 2nd, despite his home in Stillwater remaining in the 6th, in order to avoid a match up with Kennedy.

=== Republican primary ===
==== Candidates ====
===== Nominee =====
- John Kline, retired United States Marine Corps Colonel and nominee for the 6th district in 1998 & 2000

===== Declined =====
- Mark Kennedy, incumbent U.S. Representative (running in the 6th district)
- Steve Sviggum, Speaker of the Minnesota House of Representatives

==== Results ====
Republican Primary Election
Party	Candidate	Votes	%
Republican	John Kline	22,596	100.0
Total votes		22,596	100.0

=== DFL primary ===
==== Candidates ====
===== Nominee =====
- Bill Luther, incumbent U.S. Representative from the 6th district

===== Declined =====
- Steve Murphy, state senator
- Bob Vanasek, former Speaker of the Minnesota House of Representatives

==== Results ====
Democratic–Farmer–Labor Primary Election
Party	Candidate	Votes	%
Democratic (DFL)	Bill Luther (Incumbent)	14,437	100.0
Total votes		14,437	100.0

=== Other Candidates ===
- Samuel Garst (No New Taxes), marketing consultant, DFL nominee for State House, District 33B in 1998 and for State Senate, District 33 in 2000

=== General election ===
==== Campaign ====
Luther, who was first elected to Congress in 1994, was unchallenged in the DFL primary. However, in the general election against Republican challenger John Kline, the more conservative composition of the new district worked against him. Luther's campaign was further harmed by political fallout that was created when Samuel Garst, a Luther campaign staffer, entered the race on the "No New Taxes" line in an attempt to use a false flag to split the conservative vote.

==== Predictions ====
Source	Ranking	As of
Sabato's Crystal Ball	Lean R	November 4, 2002
New York Times	Tossup	October 14, 2002

==== Results ====
In the end, Garst was only able to secure 4.3 percent of the vote, and the political damage to Luther contributed to Kline winning the election by a margin of more than 11 percent.

Minnesota's 2nd Congressional district election, 2002
Party	Candidate	Votes	%
Republican	John Kline	152,970	53.3
Democratic (DFL)	Bill Luther (Incumbent)	121,121	42.2
No New Taxes	Samuel Garst	12,430	4.3
Write-in		339	0.1
Total votes		286,860	100.0
Republican hold			

==== Finances ====
Candidate (party)	Raised	Spent	Cash on hand
John Kline (R)	$1,553,133	$1,535,405	$50,091
Bill Luther (DFL)	$2,485,486	$3,538,110	$41,588
Samuel Garst (NNT)	Unreported		

== District 3 ==
2002 Minnesota's 3rd congressional district election
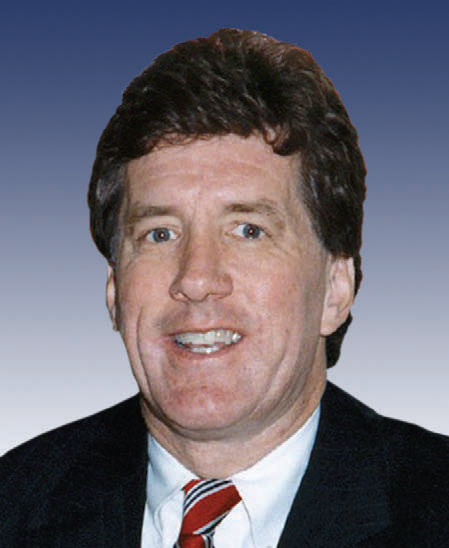

Nominee	Jim Ramstad	Darryl Stanton
Party	Republican	Democratic (DFL)
Popular vote	213,334	82,575
Percentage	72.0%	27.9%
- Precinct results Ramstad: 50–60% 60–70% 70–80% 80–90% Stanton: 50–60%
U.S. Representative before election
Jim Ramstad
Republican
Elected U.S. Representative
Jim Ramstad
Republican

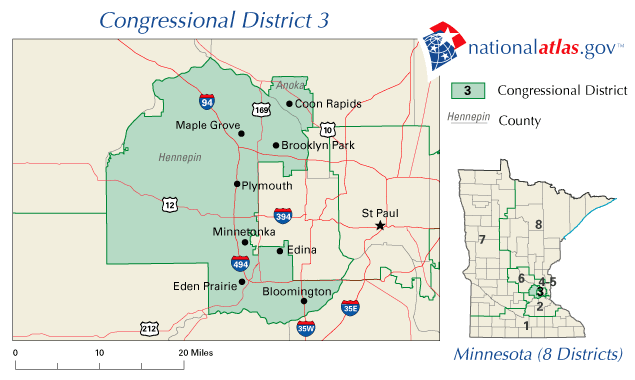

After redistricting the new 3rd district was made of approximately 87% from the old 3rd with 10% from the old 6th and 3% from the 5th. Incumbent Republican Jim Ramstad, who had represented the district since 1991, ran for re-election. He was re-elected with 67.6% of the vote in 2000

=== Republican primary ===
==== Candidates ====
===== Nominee =====
- Jim Ramstad, incumbent U.S. Representative

==== Results ====
Republican Primary Election
Party	Candidate	Votes	%
Republican	Jim Ramstad (Incumbent)	26,275	100.0
Total votes		26,275	100.0

=== DFL primary ===
==== Candidates ====
===== Nominee =====
- Darryl Stanton, entrepreneur, inventor and candidate for this seat in 2000

==== Results ====
Democratic–Farmer–Labor Primary Election
Party	Candidate	Votes	%
Democratic (DFL)	Darryl Stanton	14,837	100.0
Total votes		14,837	100.0

=== General election ===
==== Predictions ====
Source	Ranking	As of
Sabato's Crystal Ball	Safe R	November 4, 2002
New York Times	Safe R	October 14, 2002

==== Results ====
Ramstad won election to his seventh term in Congress, by a landslide 44.14 percent margin.

Minnesota's 3rd Congressional district election, 2002
Party	Candidate	Votes	%
Republican	Jim Ramstad (Incumbent)	213,334	72.0
Democratic (DFL)	Darryl Stanton	82,575	27.9
Write-in		309	0.1
Total votes		296,218	100.0
Republican hold			

==== Finances ====
Candidate (party)	Raised	Spent	Cash on hand
Jim Ramstad (R)	$1,040,631	$794,180	$891,541
Darryl Stanton (D)	Unreported		

== District 4 ==
2002 Minnesota's 4th congressional district election
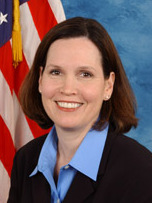

Nominee	Betty McCollum	Clyde Billington
Party	Democratic (DFL)	Republican
Popular vote	164,597	89,705
Percentage	62.2%	33.9%
- Precinct results McCollum: 40–50% 50–60% 60–70% 70–80% 80–90% Billington: 40–50% 50–60% 60–70%
U.S. Representative before election
Betty McCollum
Democratic (DFL)
Elected U.S. Representative
Betty McCollum
Democratic (DFL)

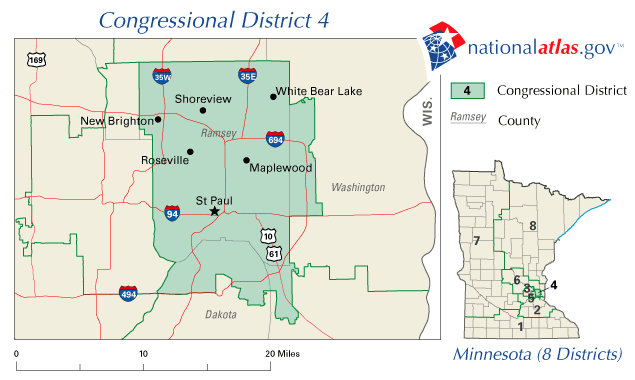

The district was largely unaffected by the redistricting with the new 4th district was made of approximately 92% from the old 4th with 8% from the old 6th. Incumbent Democrat Betty McCollum, who had represented the district since 2001, ran for re-election. She was elected with 48.0% of the vote in 2000.

=== DFL primary ===
==== Candidates ====
===== Nominee =====
- Betty McCollum, incumbent U.S. Representative

==== Results ====
Democratic–Farmer–Labor Primary Election
Party	Candidate	Votes	%
Democratic (DFL)	Betty McCollum (Incumbent)	30,878	100.0
Total votes		30,878	100.0

=== Republican primary ===
==== Candidates ====
===== Nominee =====
- Clyde Billington, history professor at University of Northwestern – St. Paul and chair of the 4th District Republican Party.

==== Results ====
Republican Primary Election
Party	Candidate	Votes	%
Republican	Clyde Billington	14,052	100.0
Total votes		14,052	100.0

=== Independence primary ===
==== Candidates ====
===== Withdrawn =====
- Peter Vento, Antique store owner and son of former U.S. Representative Bruce Vento

=== Green primary ===
==== Candidates ====
===== Nominee =====
- Scott Raskiewicz, substitute public school teacher

==== Results ====
Green Primary Election
Party	Candidate	Votes	%
Green	Scott Raskiewicz	877	100.0
Total votes		877	100.0

=== General election ===
==== Predictions ====
Source	Ranking	As of
Sabato's Crystal Ball	Safe D	November 4, 2002
New York Times	Safe D	October 14, 2002

==== Results ====
Defeating Billington by a comfortable 28 percent margin, McCollum easily won her second term in Congress, as Raskiewicz finished a very distant third.

Minnesota's 4th Congressional district election, 2002
Party	Candidate	Votes	%
Democratic (DFL)	Betty McCollum (Incumbent)	164,597	62.2
Republican	Clyde Billington	89,705	33.9
Green	Scott Raskiewicz	9,919	3.8
Write-in		319	0.1
Total votes		264,540	100.0
Democratic (DFL) hold			

==== Finances ====
Candidate (party)	Raised	Spent	Cash on hand
Betty McCollum (DFL)	$736,337	$699,558	$143,546
Clyde Billington (R)	$87,613	$87,612	$0
Scott Raskiewicz (G)	Unreported		

== District 5 ==
2002 Minnesota's 5th congressional district election
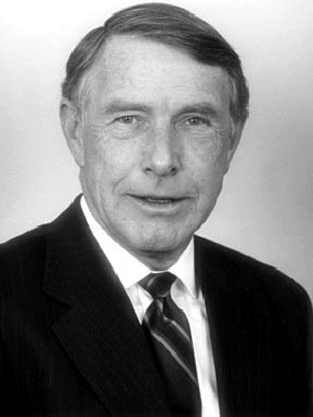

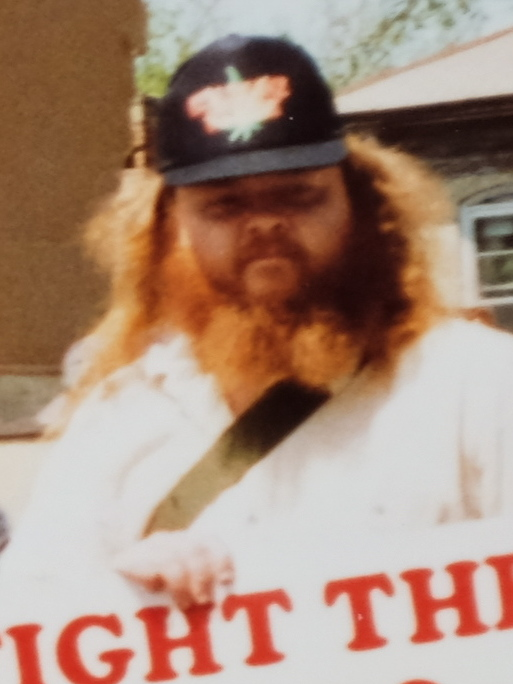
Nominee	Martin Olav Sabo	Daniel Nielsen Mathias	Tim Davis
Party	Democratic (DFL)	Republican	Green
Popular vote	171,572	66,271	17,825
Percentage	67.0%	25.9%	7.0%
- Precinct results Sabo: 40–50% 50–60% 60–70% 70–80% 80–90% Mathias: 50–60%
U.S. Representative before election
Martin Olav Sabo
Democratic (DFL)
Elected U.S. Representative
Martin Olav Sabo
Democratic (DFL)

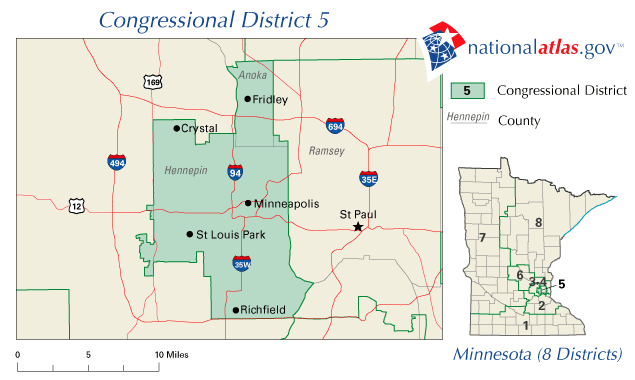

Incumbent Democrat Martin Olav Sabo, who had represented the district since 1979, ran for re-election. He was re-elected with 69.2% of the vote in 2000.

=== DFL primary ===
==== Candidates ====
===== Nominee =====
- Martin Olav Sabo, incumbent U.S. Representative

==== Results ====
Democratic–Farmer–Labor Primary Election
Party	Candidate	Votes	%
Democratic (DFL)	Martin Olav Sabo (Incumbent)	33,310	100.0
Total votes		33,310	100.0

=== Republican primary ===
==== Candidates ====
===== Nominee =====
- Daniel Mathias, courier driver and part time college professor

==== Results ====
Republican Primary Election
Party	Candidate	Votes	%
Republican	Daniel Nielsen Mathias	9,947	100.0
Total votes		9,947	100.0

=== Green primary ===
==== Candidates ====
===== Nominee =====
- Tim Davis, environmental activist and nominee for Lieutenant Governor in 1994 and for U.S. Senate in 1996

==== Results ====
Green Primary Election
Party	Candidate	Votes	%
Green	Tim Davis	1,635	100.0
Total votes		1,635	100.0

=== General election ===
==== Predictions ====
Source	Ranking	As of
Sabato's Crystal Ball	Safe D	November 4, 2002
New York Times	Safe D	October 14, 2002

==== Results ====
Sabo had no difficulty winning his 13th term in Congress, defeating Republican challenger Daniel Nielsen Mathias by a margin of just over 41 percent, while Green candidate Tim Davis finished a distant third.

Minnesota's 5th Congressional district election, 2002
Party	Candidate	Votes	%
Democratic (DFL)	Martin Olav Sabo (Incumbent)	171,572	67.0
Republican	Daniel Mathias	66,271	25.9
Green	Tim Davis	17,825	7.0
Write-in		314	0.1
Total votes		255,982	100.0
Democratic (DFL) hold			

==== Finances ====
Candidate (party)	Raised	Spent	Cash on hand
Martin Olav Sabo (DFL)	$463,831	$507,209	$162,110
Dan Mathias (R)	$9,699	$13,409	$21
Tim Davis (G)	Unreported		

== District 6 ==
2002 Minnesota's 6th congressional district election
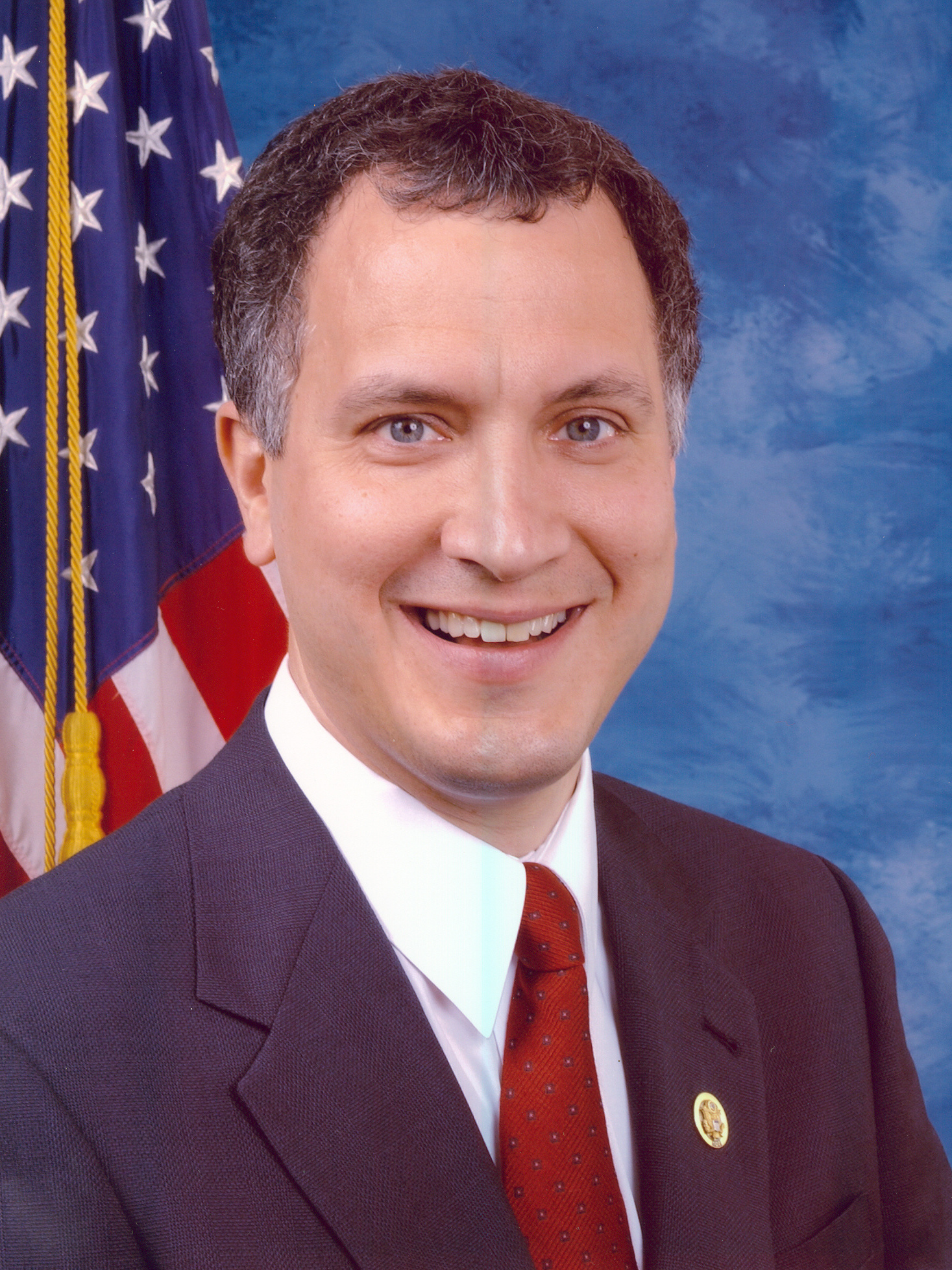

Nominee	Mark Kennedy	Janet Robert	Dan Becker
Party	Republican	Democratic (DFL)	Independence
Popular vote	164,747	100,738	21,484
Percentage	57.3%	35.1%	7.5%
- Precinct results Kennedy: 40–50% 50–60% 60–70% 70–80% Robert: 40–50% 50–60% 60–70%
U.S. Representative before election
Bill Luther
Democratic (DFL)
Elected U.S. Representative
Mark Kennedy
Republican

In the reapportionment that occurred in consequence of the 2000 United States census, the old 6th was effectively split into two main parts, with approximately 50% forming the core of the redrawn seat and the next largest portion (around 41%) becoming part of the new 2nd. The new 6th also contained 24% from the old 7th, 14% from the 2nd, 10% from the 8th and 3% from the 3rd.

Incumbent Democrat Bill Luther, who had represented the district since 1995, opted to move to the new 2nd and run for re-election there, after Mark Kennedy, the incumbent Republican from the old 2nd, decided to contest the redrawn 6th.

=== DFL primary ===
==== Candidates ====
===== Nominee =====
- Janet Robert, attorney and former Oak Park Heights City Council member

===== Declined =====
- Bill Luther, incumbent U.S. Representative (running in the 2nd district)

==== Results ====
Democratic–Farmer–Labor Primary Election
Party	Candidate	Votes	%
Democratic (DFL)	Janet Robert	16,204	100.0
Total votes		16,204	100.0

=== Republican primary ===
==== Candidates ====
===== Nominee =====
- Mark Kennedy, incumbent U.S. Representative from the 2nd district

===== Withdrawn =====
- David Reichow, consultant

===== Declined =====
- Rod Grams, former U.S. Senator
- Dave Kleis, state senator
- Dan Stevens, state senator (running in the 7th district)

==== Results ====
Republican Primary Election
Party	Candidate	Votes	%
Republican	Mark Kennedy (Incumbent)	22,239	100.0
Total votes		22,239	100.0

=== Independence primary ===
==== Candidates ====
===== Nominee =====
- Dan Becker, state-licensed drug and alcohol counselor

==== Results ====
Independence Primary Election
Party	Candidate	Votes	%
Independence	Dan Becker	2,199	100.0
Total votes		2,199	100.0

=== General election ===
==== Campaign ====
Corporate ethics became a major theme of the campaign with both Kennedy and Robert running attack ads linking the other to lawsuits involving companies they had worked for.

==== Predictions ====
Source	Ranking	As of
Sabato's Crystal Ball	Lean R (flip)	November 4, 2002
New York Times	Safe R (flip)	October 14, 2002

==== Results ====
Kennedy, who was first elected in 2000, encountered little difficulty in winning his second term in Congress, defeating DFL challenger Janet Robert by a landslide margin of 22.28 percent, while Independence Party candidate Dan Becker finished a distant third.

Minnesota's 6th Congressional district election, 2002
Party	Candidate	Votes	%
Republican	Mark Kennedy (Incumbent)	164,747	57.3
Democratic (DFL)	Janet Robert	100,738	35.1
Independence	Dan Becker	21,484	7.5
Write-in		343	0.1
Total votes		287,312	100.0
Republican gain from Democratic (DFL)			

==== Finances ====
Candidate (party)	Raised	Spent	Cash on hand
Janet Robert (D)	$2,180,560	$2,178,467	$2,092
Mark Kennedy (R)	$1,901,227	$1,844,908	$24,932
Daniel Becker (I)	$8,493	$8,489	$0

== District 7 ==
2002 Minnesota's 7th congressional district election
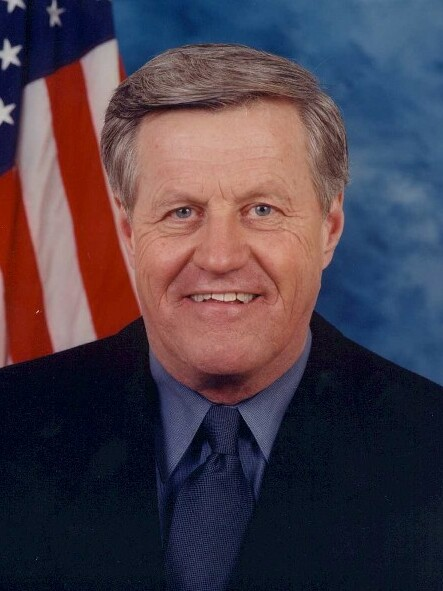

Nominee	Collin Peterson	Dan Stevens
Party	Democratic (DFL)	Republican
Popular vote	170,234	90,342
Percentage	65.3%	34.6%
- Precinct results Peterson: 50–60% 60–70% 70–80% 80–90% >90% Stevens: 50–60% 60–70% 70–80% Tie: 40–50% 50%
U.S. Representative before election
Collin Peterson
Democratic (DFL)
Elected U.S. Representative
Collin Peterson
Democratic (DFL)

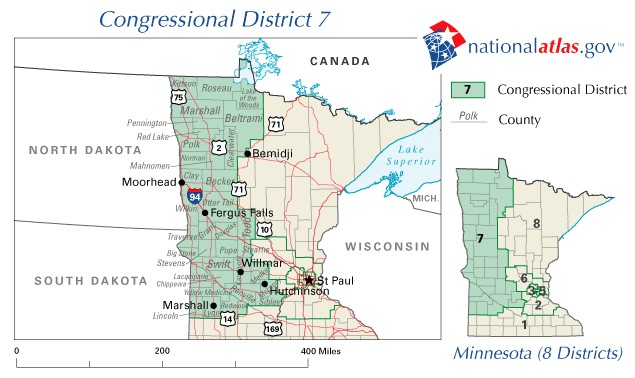

Following redistricting approximately 62% from the old 7th remained with 38% from the old 2nd transferring in. Incumbent Democrat Collin Peterson, who had represented the district since 1991, ran for re-election. He was re-elected with 68.7% of the vote in 2000.

=== DFL primary ===
==== Candidates ====
===== Nominee =====
- Collin Peterson, incumbent U.S. Representative

==== Results ====
Democratic–Farmer–Labor Primary Election
Party	Candidate	Votes	%
Democratic (DFL)	Collin Peterson (Incumbent)	35,130	100.0
Total votes		35,130	100.0

=== Republican primary ===
==== Candidates ====
===== Nominee =====
- Dan Stevens, state senator

===== Withdrawn =====
- Brad Monson
- Leroy Schlangen, dairy farmer

==== Results ====
Republican Primary Election
Party	Candidate	Votes	%
Republican	Dan Stevens	29,855	100.0
Total votes		29,855	100.0

=== General election ===
==== Predictions ====
Source	Ranking	As of
Sabato's Crystal Ball	Safe D	November 4, 2002
New York Times	Safe D	October 14, 2002

==== Results ====
Peterson faced no difficulty winning his 8th term in Congress, defeating Republican challenger Dan Stevens by a landslide 30.63 percent margin.

Minnesota's 7th Congressional district election, 2002
Party	Candidate	Votes	%
Democratic (DFL)	Collin Peterson (Incumbent)	170,234	65.3
Republican	Dan Stevens	90,342	34.6
Write-in		237	0.1
Total votes		260,813	100.0
Democratic (DFL) hold			

==== Finances ====
Candidate (party)	Raised	Spent	Cash on hand
Collin Peterson (DFL)	$417,253	$535,219	$123,864
Dan Stevens (R)	$209,629	$201,199	$8,431

== District 8 ==
2002 Minnesota's 8th congressional district election
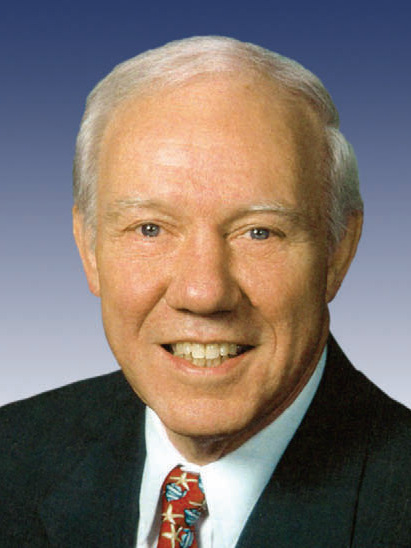

Nominee	Jim Oberstar	Bob Lemen
Party	Democratic (DFL)	Republican
Popular vote	194,909	88,673
Percentage	68.6%	31.2%
- Precinct results Oberstar: 50–60% 60–70% 70–80% 80–90% >90% Lemen: 40–50% 50–60% 60–70% 70–80% >90% Tie: 50%
U.S. Representative before election
Jim Oberstar
Democratic (DFL)
Elected U.S. Representative
Jim Oberstar
Democratic (DFL)

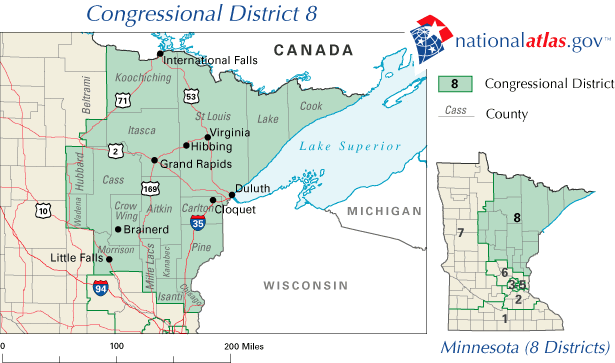

The 8th district remained mostly untouched by the redistricting with approximately 91% of the new seat remaining, with 9% added from the old 7th. Incumbent Democrat Jim Oberstar, who had represented the district since 1975, ran for re-election. He was re-elected with 67.8% of the vote in 2000.

=== DFL primary ===
==== Candidates ====
===== Nominee =====
- Jim Oberstar, incumbent U.S. Representative

==== Results ====
Democratic–Farmer–Labor Primary Election
Party	Candidate	Votes	%
Democratic (DFL)	James L. Oberstar (Incumbent)	50,582	100.0
Total votes		50,582	100.0

=== Republican primary ===
==== Candidates ====
===== Nominee =====
- Robert N. Lemen, businessman, former state representative and nominee for this seat in 2000

===== Eliminated in primary =====
- Warren Nelson, engineering consultant and candidate for this seat in 2000

==== Results ====
Republican Primary Election
Party	Candidate	Votes	%
Republican	Robert Lemen	13,422	50.6
Republican	Warren Nelson	13,132	49.4
Total votes		26,554	100.0

=== General election ===
==== Predictions ====
Source	Ranking	As of
Sabato's Crystal Ball	Safe D	November 4, 2002
New York Times	Safe D	October 14, 2002

==== Results ====
Oberstar had no difficulty winning his 15th term in Congress, defeating Republican challenger Bob Lemen by a margin of more than 37 percent.

Minnesota's 8th Congressional district election, 2002
Party	Candidate	Votes	%
Democratic (DFL)	Jim Oberstar (Incumbent)	194,909	68.7
Republican	Robert Lemen	88,673	31.2
Write-in		349	0.1
Total votes		283,931	100.0
Democratic (DFL) hold			

==== Finances ====
Candidate (party)	Raised	Spent	Cash on hand
Jim Oberstar (DFL)	$1,057,294	$1,030,632	$75,308
Robert Lemen (R)	$16,349	$16,887	$623
