= 2000 United States House of Representatives elections in Minnesota =

- November 7, 2000

All 8 Minnesota seats to the United States House of Representatives
	Majority party	Minority party
Party	Democratic (DFL)	Republican
Last election	6	2
Seats before	5	2
Seats won	5	3
Seat change	▼1	▲1
Popular vote	1,234,204	993,371
Percentage	52.21%	42.02%

Democratic–Farmer–Labor
40–50%
50–60%
60–70%
70–80%
80–90%
Republican
40–50%
50–60%
60–70%

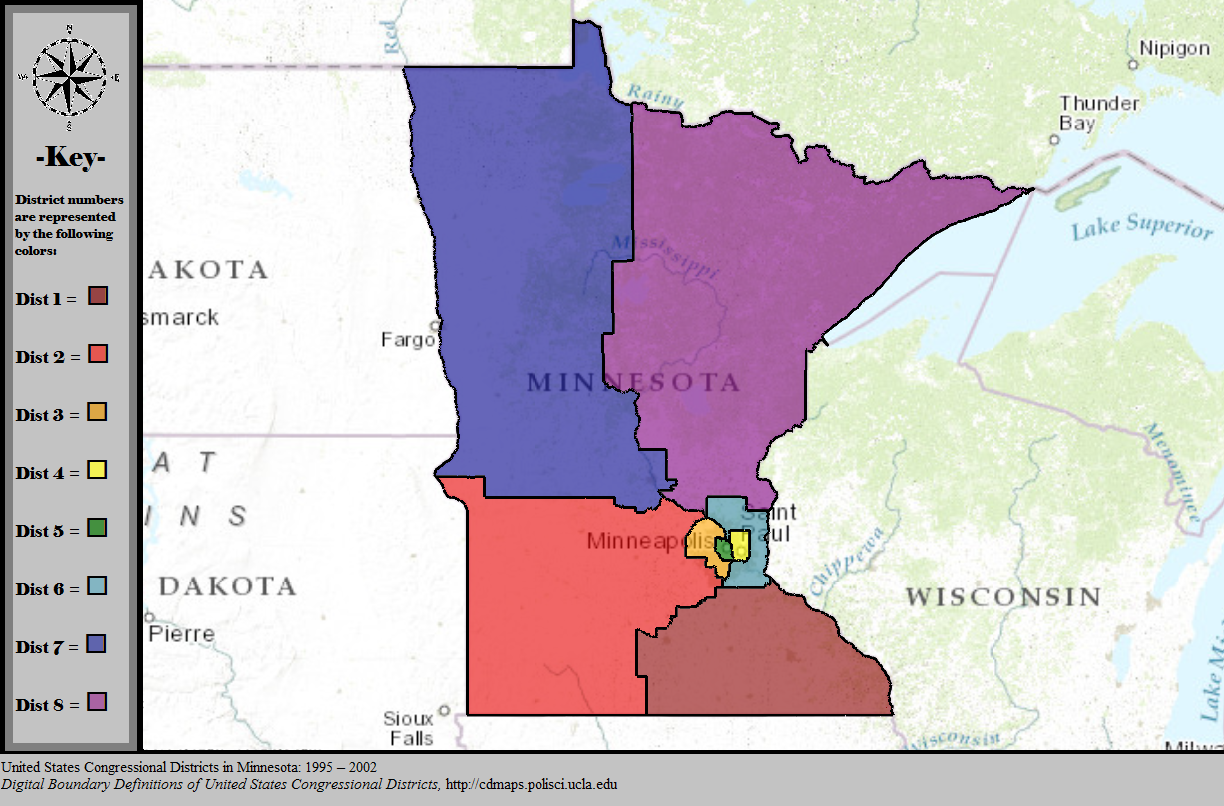
Map of Minnesota showing all eight districts

The 2000 congressional elections in Minnesota were held on November 7, 2000 to determine who would represent the state of Minnesota in the United States House of Representatives.

Minnesota had eight seats in the House, apportioned according to the 1990 United States census. Representatives are elected for two-year terms; those elected served in the 107th Congress from January 3, 2001 until January 3, 2003. The election coincided with the 2000 presidential election and the 2000 U.S. Senate election.

Except for DFLer David Minge of the 2nd congressional district, all other House incumbents from Minnesota who stood for reelection were reelected. Minge's seat came under the control of the Republican Party of Minnesota as a result of the 2000 election. DFL incumbent Bruce Vento of the 4th congressional district died in office less than a month prior to the election; however, he was not seeking reelection, and the DFL nominee running for election to replace him, Betty McCollum, was able to keep the seat in the DFL's hands.

== Overview ==
=== Statewide ===
Party	Candidates	Votes		Seats		
Party	Candidates	No.	%	No.	+/–	%
Democratic-Farmer-Labor	8	1,234,204	52.21	5	▼1	62.50
Republican	8	993,371	42.02	3	▲1	37.50
Independence	3	75,097	3.18	0	Steady	0.0
Constitution	6	24,248	1.03	0	Steady	0.0
Other	1	19,667	0.83	0	Steady	0.0
Libertarian	4	17,151	0.73	0	Steady	0.0
Total	30	2,363,738	100.0	8	Steady	100.0

Popular vote
Democratic	52.21%
Republican	42.02%
Independence	3.18%
Other	2.58%

House seats
Democratic	62.50%
Republican	37.50%

== District 1 ==
2000 Minnesota's 1st congressional district election
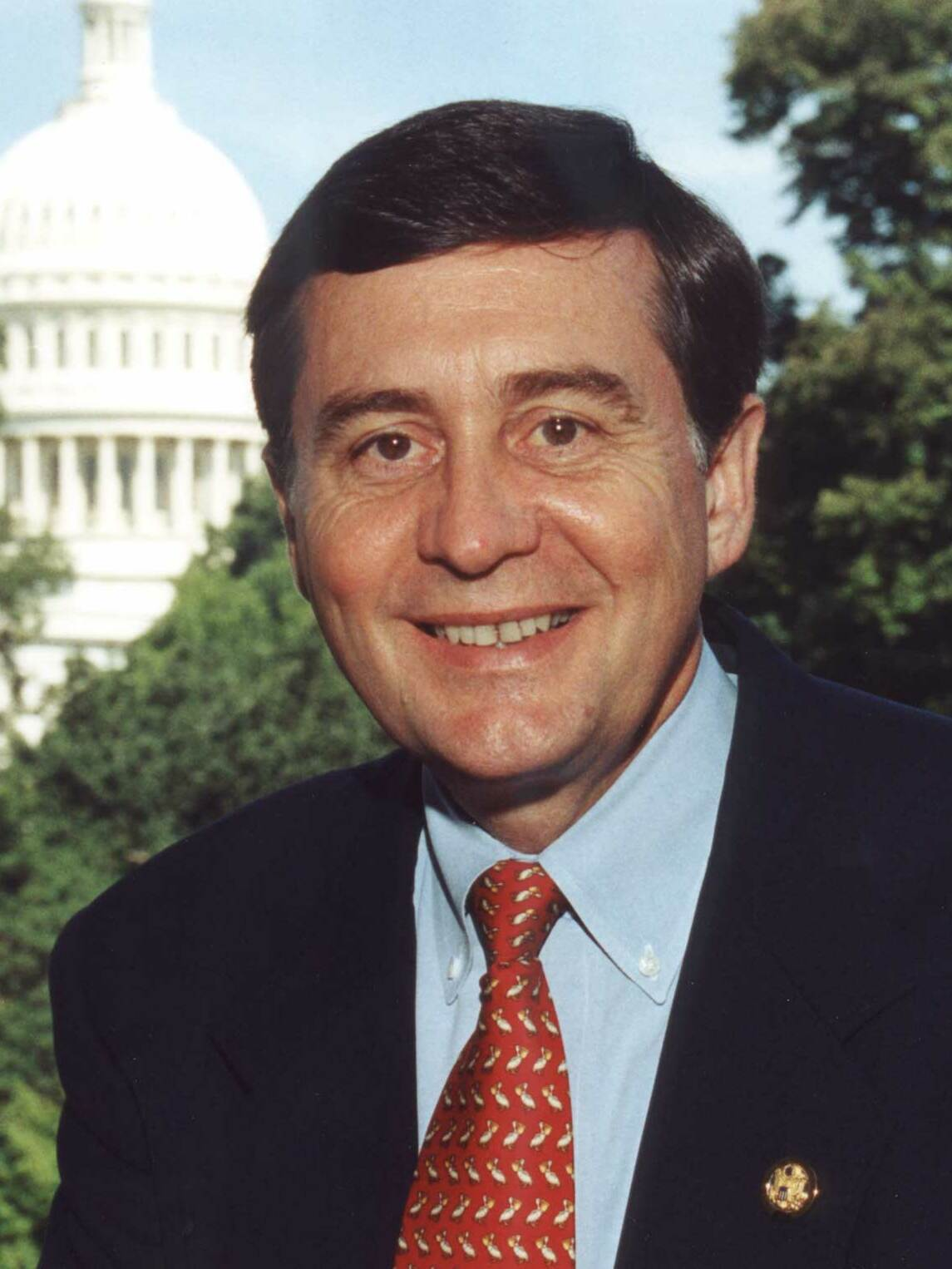

Nominee	Gil Gutknecht	Mary Rieder
Party	Republican	Democratic (DFL)
Popular vote	159,835	117,946
Percentage	56.4%	41.6%
- Precinct results Gutknecht: 40–50% 50–60% 60–70% 70–80% 80–90% >90% Rieder: 40–50% 50–60% 60–70% 70–80% >90% Tie: 40–50% 50% No votes
U.S. Representative before election
Gil Gutknecht
Republican
Elected U.S. Representative
Gil Gutknecht
Republican

Incumbent Republican Gil Gutknecht, who had represented Minnesota's 1st congressional district since 1994, ran against Mary Rieder of the DFL and Rich Osness of the Libertarian Party.

=== Republican primary ===
==== Candidates ====
===== Nominee =====
- Gil Gutknecht, incumbent U.S. representative

==== Results ====
Republican primary election
Party	Candidate	Votes	%
Republican	Gil Gutknecht (incumbent)	17,824	100.0
Total votes		17,824	100.0

=== DFL primary ===
==== Candidates ====
===== Nominee =====
- Mary Rieder, economics professor at Winona State University and nominee for this seat in 1998

==== Results ====
Democratic–Farmer–Labor primary election
Party	Candidate	Votes	%
Democratic (DFL)	Mary Rieder	31,244	100.0
Total votes		31,244	100.0

=== Libertarian primary ===
==== Candidates ====
===== Nominee =====
- Rich Osness, photographer, business owner and nominee for state senate, District 27 in 1996

=== General election ===
==== Results ====
Gutknecht won a fourth term, defeating second-place Rieder by a landslide margin of nearly 15 percent, as Osness placed at a very distant third.

Minnesota's 1st Congressional district election, 2000
Party	Candidate	Votes	%
Republican	Gil Gutknecht (incumbent)	159,835	56.4
Democratic (DFL)	Mary Rieder	117,946	41.6
Libertarian	Rich Osness	5,440	1.9
Total votes		283,221	100.0
Republican hold			

== District 2 ==
2000 Minnesota's 2nd congressional district election
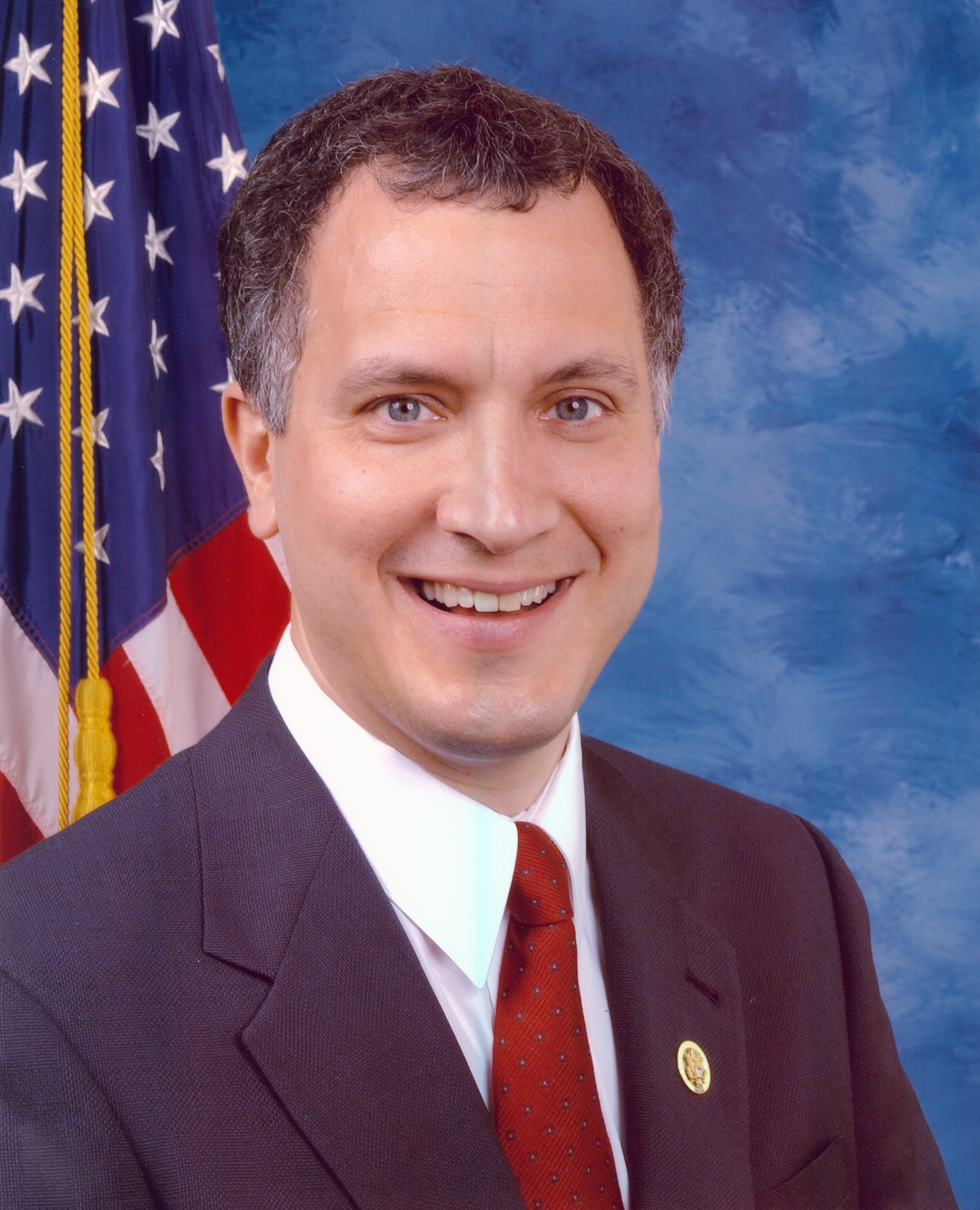

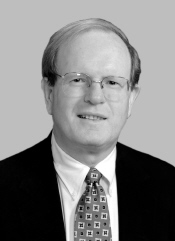
Nominee	Mark Kennedy	David Minge
Party	Republican	Democratic (DFL)
Popular vote	138,957	138,802
Percentage	48.1%	48.0%
- Precinct results Kennedy: 40–50% 50–60% 60–70% 70–80% 80–90% Minge: 40–50% 50–60% 60–70% 70–80% 80–90% >90% Tie: 40–50% No votes
U.S. Representative before election
David Minge
Democratic (DFL)
Elected U.S. Representative
Mark Kennedy
Republican

Incumbent DFLer David Minge, who was first elected in 1992, ran against Mark Kennedy of the Republican Party, Gerald W. Brekke of the Independence Party, Ron Helwig of the Libertarian Party, and Dennis A. Burda of the Constitution Party.

=== DFL primary ===
==== Candidates ====
===== Nominee =====
- David Minge, incumbent U.S. representative

==== Results ====
Democratic–Farmer–Labor primary election
Party	Candidate	Votes	%
Democratic (DFL)	David Minge (incumbent)	30,089	100.0
Total votes		30,089	100.0

=== Republican primary ===
==== Candidates ====
===== Nominee =====
- Mark Kennedy, business executive

===== Eliminated in primary =====
- Joe Wagner, Scott County commissioner

==== Results ====
Republican primary election
Party	Candidate	Votes	%
Republican	Mark Kennedy	13,779	79.3
Republican	Joe Wagner	3,598	20.7
Total votes		17,377	100.0

=== Independence primary ===
==== Candidates ====
===== Nominee =====
- Gerald Brekke, retired professor at Gustavus Adolphus College and Republican nominee for U.S. Senate in 1976 and for Minnesota secretary of state in 1978

===== Eliminated in primary =====
- Stan Bentz, perennial candidate

==== Results ====
Independence primary election
Party	Candidate	Votes	%
Independence	Gerald W. Brekke	292	52.6
Independence	Stan Bentz	263	47.4
Total votes		555	100.0

=== Libertarian primary ===
==== Candidates ====
===== Nominee =====
- Ron Helwig, software engineer

=== Constitution primary ===
==== Candidates ====
===== Nominee =====
- Dennis Burda, computer network specialist

==== Results ====
Constitution primary election
Party	Candidate	Votes	%
Constitution	Dennis Burda	170	100.0
Total votes		170	100.0

=== General election ===
==== Results ====
Kennedy dashed Minge's hopes for a fifth term, defeating the incumbent by a razor-thin margin of six one hundredths of one percent of the vote, while Brekke finished a very distant third. Helwig and Burda, respectively, finished an even more distant fourth and fifth. Minge conceded the race on December 12.

Minnesota's 2nd Congressional district election, 2000
Party	Candidate	Votes	%
Republican	Mark Kennedy	138,957	48.1
Democratic (DFL)	David Minge (incumbent)	138,802	48.0
Independence	Gerald Brekke	7,875	2.7
Libertarian	Ron Helwig	1,929	0.7
Constitution	Dennis Burda	1,337	0.5
Total votes		288,900	100.0
Republican gain from Democratic (DFL)			

== District 3 ==
2000 Minnesota's 3rd congressional district election
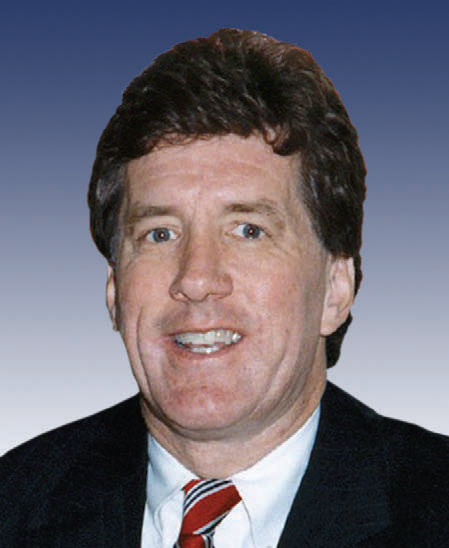

Nominee	Jim Ramstad	Sue Shuff
Party	Republican	Democratic (DFL)
Popular vote	222,571	98,219
Percentage	67.6%	29.8%
- Precinct results Ramstad: 40–50% 50–60% 60–70% 70–80% 80–90% Shuff: 40–50% 50–60% No votes
U.S. Representative before election
Jim Ramstad
Republican
Elected U.S. Representative
Jim Ramstad
Republican

Incumbent Republican Jim Ramstad, who was first elected in 1990, faced off against Sue Shuff of the DFL, Bob Odden of the Libertarian Party, and Arne Niska of the Constitution Party.

=== Republican primary ===
==== Candidates ====
===== Nominee =====
- Jim Ramstad, incumbent U.S. representative

==== Results ====
Republican primary election
Party	Candidate	Votes	%
Republican	Jim Ramstad (incumbent)	13,995	100.0
Total votes		13,995	100.0

=== DFL primary ===
==== Candidates ====
===== Nominee =====
- Sue Shuff, facilitator

===== Eliminated in primary =====
- Darryl Stanton, entrepreneur and inventor

==== Results ====
Democratic–Farmer–Labor primary election
Party	Candidate	Votes	%
Democratic (DFL)	Sue Shuff	29,841	74.5
Democratic (DFL)	Darryl Stanton	10,197	25.5
Total votes		40,038	100.0

=== Libertarian primary ===
==== Candidates ====
===== Nominee =====
- Bob Odden, business safety consultant and nominee for State Senate, District 62 in 1996 and for state auditor in 1998

=== Constitution primary ===
==== Candidates ====
===== Nominee =====
- Arne Niska, electrical engineer

==== Results ====
Constitution primary election
Party	Candidate	Votes	%
Constitution	Arne Niska	111	100.0
Total votes		111	100.0

=== General election ===
==== Results ====
Ramstad had no difficulty winning a sixth term in Congress, as he defeated Shuff by a 37.79 percent margin, while Odden finished a distant third and Niska finished slightly behind Odden.

Minnesota's 3rd Congressional district election, 2000
Party	Candidate	Votes	%
Republican	Jim Ramstad (incumbent)	222,571	67.6
Democratic (DFL)	Sue Shuff	98,219	29.9
Libertarian	Bob Odden	5,302	1.6
Constitution	Arne Niska	2,970	0.9
Total votes		329,062	100.0
Republican hold			

== District 4 ==
2000 Minnesota's 4th congressional district election
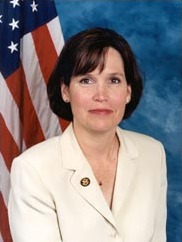

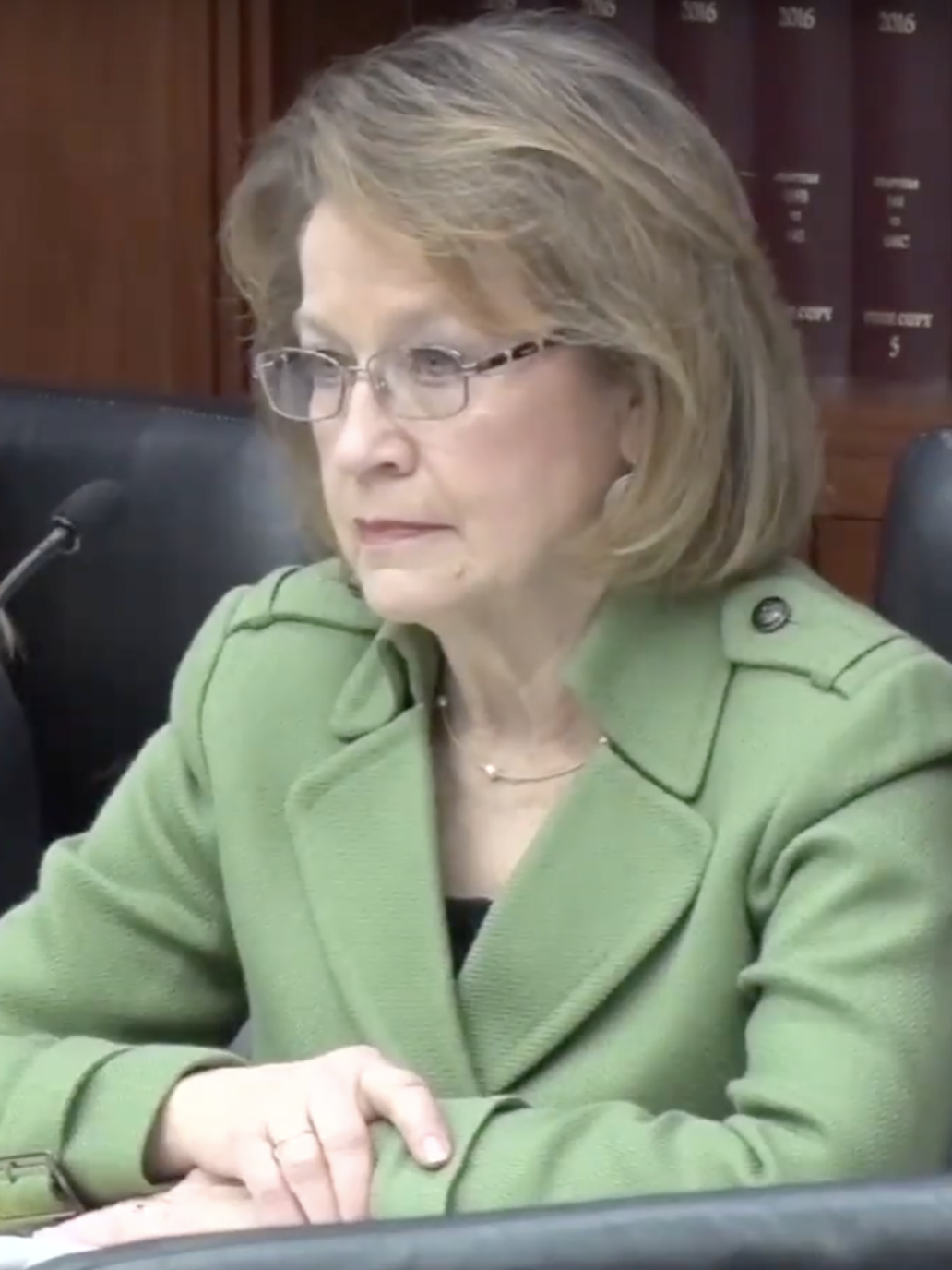

Nominee	Betty McCollum	Linda Runbeck	Tom Foley
Party	Democratic (DFL)	Republican	Independence
Popular vote	130,403	83,852	55,899
Percentage	48.0%	30.9%	20.6%
- Precinct results McCollum: 30–40% 40–50% 50–60% 60–70% 70–80% Runbeck: 30–40% 40–50% 50–60% 60–70% 70–80% No votes
U.S. Representative before election
Bruce Vento
Democratic (DFL)
Elected U.S. Representative
Betty McCollum
Democratic (DFL)

Incumbent DFLer Bruce Vento died in office on October 10, 2000, less than a month before the election. However, as Vento had not been seeking reelection, it was not necessary for any special election to be held or for the DFL to select another candidate. Betty McCollum had been selected in the DFL primary to seek election to replace Vento. Opposing McCollum were Linda Runbeck of the Republican Party, Tom Foley of the Independence Party, and Nicholas Skrivanek of the Constitution Party.

=== DFL primary ===
==== Candidates ====
===== Nominee =====
- Betty McCollum, state representative from district 55B

===== Eliminated in primary =====
- Chris Coleman, St. Paul City councilor and attorney
- Cathie Hartnett, St. Paul School Board member
- Steve Novak, state senator from district 52

==== Results ====
Democratic–Farmer–Labor primary election
Party	Candidate	Votes	%
Democratic (DFL)	Betty McCollum	35,911	50.4
Democratic (DFL)	Steven Novak	16,332	22.9
Democratic (DFL)	Chris Coleman	13,555	19.0
Democratic (DFL)	Cathie Hartnett	5,454	7.7
Total votes		71,252	100.0

=== Republican primary ===
==== Candidates ====
===== Nominee =====
- Linda Runbeck, state senator from district 53

===== Eliminated in primary =====
- Mary Jane Reagan, writer, retired school teacher, nominee for this seat in 1984, candidate in 1992, for Minnesota secretary of state in 1986 and for governor in 1990

==== Results ====
Republican primary election
Party	Candidate	Votes	%
Republican	Linda Runbeck	10,722	86.2
Republican	Mary Jane Reagan	1,713	13.8
Total votes		12,435	100.0

=== Independence primary ===
==== Candidates ====
===== Nominee =====
- Tom Foley, former Ramsey County and Washington County attorney, DFL candidate for U.S. Senate in 1994 and for lieutenant governor in 1998

===== Eliminated in primary =====
- Pam Ellison, directory assistance operator

==== Results ====
Independence primary election
Party	Candidate	Votes	%
Independence	Tom Foley	750	63.3
Independence	Pam Ellison	434	36.7
Total votes		1,184	100.0

=== Constitution primary ===
==== Candidates ====
===== Nominee =====
- Nicholas Skrivanek

==== Results ====
Constitution primary election
Party	Candidate	Votes	%
Constitution	Nicholas Skrivanek	114	100.0
Total votes		114	100.0

=== General election ===
==== Polling ====
Poll source	Date(s)	Sample size	Margin of error	Linda Runbeck (R)	Betty McCollum (D)	Other / undecided (Note: Calculated by taking the difference of 100% and all other candidates combined.)
Mason-Dixon Polling & Strategy	October 31, 2000	414	—	29%	41%	30%

==== Results ====
McCollum did not face any great difficulty keeping the seat (which represented a very liberal population centered around St. Paul) in DFL hands. McCollum defeated Runbeck by a margin of more than 17 percent of the vote. Due to a surprisingly strong showing by Foley (who finished about 10 percent behind Runbeck), McCollum was able to win by such a large margin while simultaneously failing to secure a majority of the vote.

Minnesota's 4th Congressional district election, 2000
Party	Candidate	Votes	%
Democratic (DFL)	Betty McCollum	130,403	48.0
Republican	Linda Runbeck	83,852	30.9
Independence	Tom Foley	55,899	20.6
Constitution	Nicholas Skrivanek	1,285	0.5
Total votes		271,439	100.0
Democratic (DFL) hold			

== District 5 ==
2000 Minnesota's 5th congressional district election
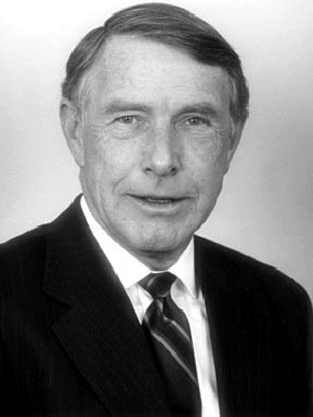

Nominee	Martin Olav Sabo	Frank Taylor
Party	Democratic (DFL)	Republican
Popular vote	176,629	58,191
Percentage	69.2%	22.8%
- Precinct results Sabo: 30–40% 40–50% 50–60% 60–70% 70–80% 80–90% Taylor: 40–50% 50–60% 60–70% 70–80% 80–90% No votes
U.S. Representative before election
Martin Olav Sabo
Democratic (DFL)
Elected U.S. Representative
Martin Olav Sabo
Democratic (DFL)

Incumbent DFLer Martin Sabo, who was first elected in 1978, faced absolutely no difficulty in winning his 12th term as the representative of the very liberal 5th congressional district, which was centered around Minneapolis.

=== DFL primary ===
==== Candidates ====
===== Nominee =====
- Martin Olav Sabo, incumbent U.S. representative

==== Results ====
Democratic–Farmer–Labor primary election
Party	Candidate	Votes	%
Democratic (DFL)	Martin Olav Sabo (incumbent)	55,879	100.0
Total votes		55,879	100.0

=== Republican primary ===
==== Candidates ====
===== Nominee =====
- Frank Taylor, teacher and nominee for this seat in 1998

===== Eliminated in primary =====
- Chris Flynn, retired accountant and candidate for this seat in 1996

==== Results ====
Republican primary election
Party	Candidate	Votes	%
Republican	Frank Taylor	4,837	63.2
Republican	Chris Flynn	2,815	36.8
Total votes		7,652	100.0

=== Independence primary ===
==== Candidates ====
===== Nominee =====
- Rob Tomich, cashier

==== Results ====
Independence primary election
Party	Candidate	Votes	%
Independence	Rob Tomich	698	100.0
Total votes		698	100.0

=== Constitution primary ===
==== Candidates ====
===== Nominee =====
- Renee Lavoi, counselor and psychotherapist

==== Results ====
Constitution primary election
Party	Candidate	Votes	%
Constitution	Renee Lavoi	128	100.0
Total votes		128	100.0

=== Libertarian primary ===
==== Candidates ====
===== Nominee =====
- Chuck Charnstrom, insurance broker

=== General election ===
==== Results ====
Although he was faced, in the general election, with a very crowded field of challengers, Sabo was able to win over 69 percent of the vote, and defeated second-place Republican Frank Taylor by an overwhelming 46.42 percent margin.

Minnesota's 5th Congressional district election, 2000
Party	Candidate	Votes	%
Democratic (DFL)	Martin Olav Sabo (incumbent)	176,629	69.2
Republican	Frank Taylor	58,191	22.8
Independence	Rob Tomich	11,323	4.4
Constitution	Renee Lavoi	4,522	1.8
Libertarian	Chuck Charnstrom	4,480	1.8
Total votes		255,145	100.0
Democratic (DFL) hold			

== District 6 ==
2000 Minnesota's 6th congressional district election
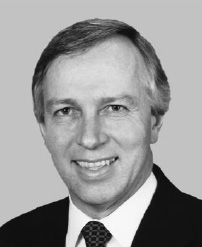

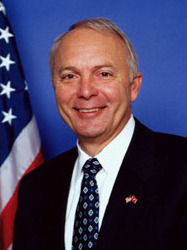
Nominee	Bill Luther	John Kline
Party	Democratic (DFL)	Republican
Popular vote	176,340	170,900
Percentage	49.6%	48.0%
- Precinct results Luther: 30–40% 40–50% 50–60% 60–70% 70–80% Kline: 30–40% 40–50% 50–60% 60–70% 70–80% Tie: 40–50% 50% No votes
U.S. Representative before election
Bill Luther
Democratic (DFL)
Elected U.S. Representative
Bill Luther
Democratic (DFL)

Incumbent Democrat Bill Luther, who was first elected as the U.S. representative from the 6th congressional district in 1994, faced an extremely close challenge in 2000.

=== DFL primary ===
==== Candidates ====
===== Nominee =====
- Bill Luther, incumbent U.S. representative

==== Results ====
Democratic–Farmer–Labor primary election
Party	Candidate	Votes	%
Democratic (DFL)	Bill Luther (incumbent)	45,378	100.0
Total votes		45,378	100.0

=== Republican primary ===
==== Candidates ====
===== Nominee =====
- John Kline, retired United States Marine Corps Colonel and nominee for this seat in 1998

==== Results ====
Republican primary election
Party	Candidate	Votes	%
Republican	John Kline	19,029	100.0
Total votes		19,029	100.0

=== Constitution primary ===
==== Candidates ====
===== Nominee =====
- Ralph Hubbard, retired United States Postal Service worker

==== Results ====
Constitution primary election
Party	Candidate	Votes	%
Constitution	Ralph Hubbard	242	100.0
Total votes		242	100.0

=== General election ===
==== Results ====
Luther won reelection for his fourth term in Congress by a razor-thin margin, defeating Republican challenger John Kline by a margin of just 1.53 percent of the vote.

Minnesota's 6th Congressional district election, 2000
Party	Candidate	Votes	%
Democratic (DFL)	Bill Luther (incumbent)	176,340	49.6
Republican	John Kline	170,900	48.0
Constitution	Ralph Hubbard	8,584	2.4
Total votes		355,824	100.0
Democratic (DFL) hold			

== District 7 ==
2000 Minnesota's 7th congressional district election
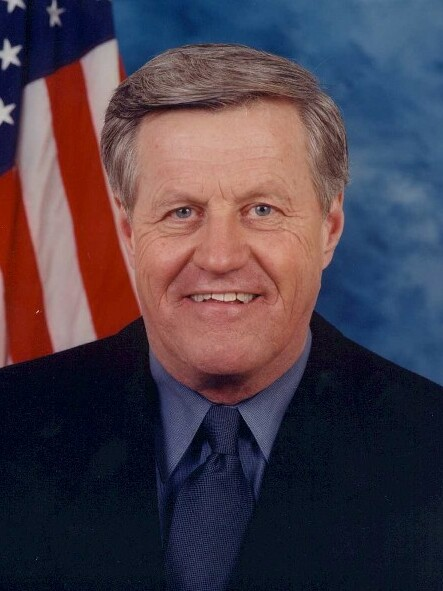

Nominee	Collin Peterson	Glen Menze
Party	Democratic (DFL)	Republican
Popular vote	185,771	79,175
Percentage	68.7%	29.3%
- Precinct results Peterson: 40–50% 50–60% 60–70% 70–80% 80–90% >90% Menze: 40–50% 50–60% 60–70% Tie: 40–50% No votes
U.S. Representative before election
Collin Peterson
Democratic (DFL)
Elected U.S. Representative
Collin Peterson
Democratic (DFL)

Incumbent DFLer Collin Peterson, who was first elected in 1990, faced no difficulty winning his sixth term in Congress, defeating Republican challenger Glen Menze by a landslide 39.41 percent margin.

=== DFL primary ===
==== Candidates ====
===== Nominee =====
- Collin Peterson, incumbent U.S. representative

==== Results ====
Democratic–Farmer–Labor primary election
Party	Candidate	Votes	%
Democratic (DFL)	Collin Peterson (incumbent)	33,948	100.0
Total votes		33,948	100.0

=== Republican primary ===
==== Candidates ====
===== Nominee =====
- Glen Menze, farmer, rental property business operator and Starbuck School Board member

===== Eliminated in primary =====
- Aleta Edin, Paynesville City councilor and nominee for this seat in 1998 and for State Senate, District 14 in 1992

==== Results ====
Republican primary election
Party	Candidate	Votes	%
Republican	Glen Menze	10,258	65.4
Republican	Aleta Edin	5,433	34.6
Total votes		15,691	100.0

=== Constitution primary ===
==== Candidates ====
===== Nominee =====
- Owen Sivertson, Integrity Windows employee

==== Results ====
Constitution primary election
Party	Candidate	Votes	%
Constitution	Owen Sivertson	141	100.0
Total votes		141	100.0

=== General election ===
==== Results ====
Minnesota's 7th Congressional district election, 2000
Party	Candidate	Votes	%
Democratic (DFL)	Collin Peterson (incumbent)	185,771	68.7
Republican	Glen Menze	79,175	29.3
Constitution	Owen Sivertson	5,550	2.1
Total votes		270,496	100.0
Democratic (DFL) hold			

== District 8 ==
2000 Minnesota's 8th congressional district election
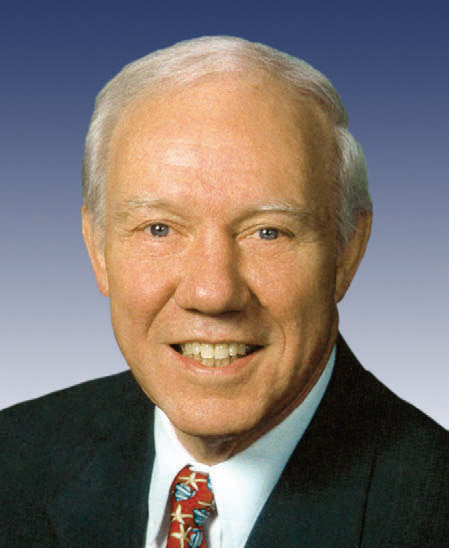

Nominee	Jim Oberstar	Bob Lemen	Mike Darling
Party	Democratic (DFL)	Republican	Independent
Popular vote	210,094	79,890	19,667
Percentage	67.8%	25.8%	6.4%
- Precinct results Oberstar: 40–50% 50–60% 60–70% 70–80% 80–90% >90% Lemen: 40–50% 50–60% 60–70% >90% Tie: 40–50% 50% No votes
U.S. Representative before election
Jim Oberstar
Democratic (DFL)
Elected U.S. Representative
Jim Oberstar
Democratic (DFL)

Incumbent DFLer Jim Oberstar, who was first elected in 1974, had no difficulty winning his 14th term in Congress, defeating Republican challenger Bob Lemen by a margin of more than 42 percent.

=== DFL primary ===
==== Candidates ====
===== Nominee =====
- Jim Oberstar, incumbent U.S. representative

==== Results ====
Democratic–Farmer–Labor primary election
Party	Candidate	Votes	%
Democratic (DFL)	James L. Oberstar (incumbent)	64,189	100.0
Total votes		64,189	100.0

=== Republican primary ===
==== Candidates ====
===== Nominee =====
- Robert N. Lemen, businessman and former state representative

===== Eliminated in primary =====
- Warren L. Nelson, engineering consultant

==== Results ====
Republican primary election
Party	Candidate	Votes	%
Republican	Robert Lemen	7,197	50.1
Republican	Warren Nelson	7,179	49.9
Total votes		14,376	100.0

=== Other Candidates ===
- Mike Darling (Independent), personal finance analyst

=== General election ===
==== Results ====
Minnesota's 8th Congressional district election, 2000
Party	Candidate	Votes	%
Democratic (DFL)	Jim Oberstar (incumbent)	210,094	67.9
Republican	Bob Lemen	79,890	25.8
Independent	Mike Darling	19,667	6.4
Total votes		309,651	100.0
Democratic (DFL) hold			
