= Cecilia H. Hauge =

American nurse

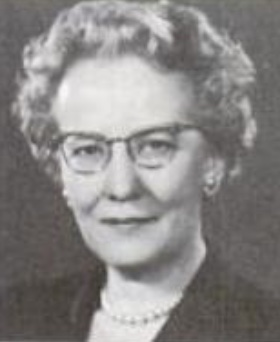
- Cecilia H. Hauge, from a 1962 publication
- Born: Cecilia Hedvig Hauge; May 18, 1905; Clarkfield, Minnesota, U.S.
- Died: May 5, 1990 (age 94); Edina, Minnesota, U.S.
- Occupations: Nurse, federal official
- Known for: Director, Veterans Administration Nursing Service (1954–1966)
- Honours: Florence Nightingale Medal (1961); Bronze Star Medal (1946)

Cecilia Hedvig Hauge (May 18, 1905 – May 5, 1990) was an American nurse. She was director of the Veterans Administration Nursing Service. The International Committee of the Red Cross awarded Hauge the Florence Nightingale Medal in 1961.

== Early life and education ==
Hauge was born in Clarkfield, Minnesota, the daughter of Malvin M. Hauge and Anna Kristine Sjelderup Hauge. Both of her parents were born in Norway. Her father and two of her brothers were doctors. She graduated from the University of Minnesota nursing school in 1929.

== Career ==
Hauge was chief nurse of Base Hospital No. 26 in France during World War II, and held the rank of lieutenant colonel when she was discharged from military service. She was a professor of nursing and superintendent of nurses at the University of Minnesota Hospitals in the late 1940s, and chief nurse of the Veterans Administration Research Hospital in Chicago in the early 1950s. She succeeded Dorothy V. Wheeler as director of the Veterans Administration Nursing Service from 1954 to 1966. In this work, she toured VA hospitals throughout the United States and worked for recruitment campaigns to increase the ranks of nurses in VA hospitals.

Hauge received a Bronze Star in 1946, for her service during World War II. The International Committee of the Red Cross awarded Hauge the Florence Nightingale Medal in 1961.

== Publications ==
- "Organization and the Management of Mass Casualties— The Role of Nurses" (1956)

== Personal life ==
Hauge died in 1990, at the age of 94, at her home in Edina, Minnesota.
