= Clarkfield, Minnesota =

City in Minnesota, United States

Clarkfield
- City
- Location of Clarkfield within Yellow Medicine County, Minnesota
- Coordinates: 44°47′25″N 95°48′27″W
- Country: United States
- State: Minnesota
- County: Yellow Medicine

Government
  - Mayor: Darrin Johnson

Area
  - Total: 1.08 sq mi (2.79 km^{2})
  - Land: 1.08 sq mi (2.79 km^{2})
  - Water: 0 sq mi (0.00 km^{2})
- Elevation: 1,089 ft (332 m)

Population (2020)
  - Total: 852
  - Density: 791.5/sq mi (305.59/km^{2})
- Time zone: UTC−6 (Central (CST))
  - Summer (DST): UTC−5 (CDT)
- ZIP code: 56223
- Area code: 320
- FIPS code: 27-11656
- GNIS feature ID: 2393538
- Website: www.clarkfield.org

Clarkfield is a city in Yellow Medicine County, Minnesota, surrounded by Friendship Township. The population was 852 at the 2020 census.

== History ==
Clarkfield was platted in 1884, and named for one Mr. Clark, a railroad agent. A post office has been in operation at Clarkfield since 1884. Clarkfield was incorporated in 1887.

== Geography ==
According to the United States Census Bureau, the city has a total area of 1.09 square miles (2.82 km^{2}), all land.

U.S. Highway 59 and Minnesota State Highway 67 are two of the main routes in the city.

== Government ==
The mayor of Clarkfield is Darrin Johnson. The city council includes Kevin Kaatz, Josh Hanson, Lisa Tilney and Craig Giles.

== Demographics ==
Historical population
Census	Pop.	Note	%±
1890	178		—
1900	437		145.5%
1910	603		38.0%
1920	724		20.1%
1930	802		10.8%
1940	965		20.3%
1950	1,012		4.9%
1960	1,100		8.7%
1970	1,084		−1.5%
1980	1,171		8.0%
1990	924		−21.1%
2000	944		2.2%
2010	863		−8.6%
2020	852		−1.3%
U.S. Decennial Census

=== 2010 census ===
As of the census of 2010, there were 863 people, 372 households, and 209 families living in the city. The population density was 791.7 inhabitants per square mile (305.7/km^{2}). There were 424 housing units at an average density of 389.0 per square mile (150.2/km^{2}). The racial makeup of the city was 95.6% White, 0.2% African American, 0.7% Native American, 0.1% Asian, 3.0% from other races, and 0.3% from two or more races. Hispanic or Latino of any race were 5.0% of the population.

There were 372 households, of which 25.3% had children under the age of 18 living with them, 43.5% were married couples living together, 5.9% had a female householder with no husband present, 6.7% had a male householder with no wife present, and 43.8% were non-families. 38.4% of all households were made up of individuals, and 21.3% had someone living alone who was 65 years of age or older. The average household size was 2.19 and the average family size was 2.89.

The median age in the city was 43.4 years. 22.5% of residents were under the age of 18; 6.9% were between the ages of 18 and 24; 22.1% were from 25 to 44; 23.6% were from 45 to 64; and 24.9% were 65 years of age or older. The gender makeup of the city was 49.1% male and 50.9% female.

=== 2000 census ===
As of the census of 2000, there were 944 people, 371 households, and 228 families living in the city. The population density was 872.7 inhabitants per square mile (337.0/km^{2}). There were 429 housing units at an average density of 396.6 per square mile (153.1/km^{2}). The racial makeup of the city was 98.52% White, 0.11% African American, 0.21% Native American, 0.11% Asian, 0.42% from other races, and 0.64% from two or more races. Hispanic or Latino of any race were 1.17% of the population.

There were 371 households, out of which 26.1% had children under the age of 18 living with them, 50.9% were married couples living together, 8.4% had a female householder with no husband present, and 38.5% were non-families. 35.3% of all households were made up of individuals, and 22.1% had someone living alone who was 65 years of age or older. The average household size was 2.25 and the average family size was 2.92.

In the city, the age distribution of the population shows 21.7% under the age of 18, 7.1% from 18 to 24, 20.9% from 25 to 44, 19.0% from 45 to 64, and 31.4% who were 65 years of age or older. The median age was 45 years. For every 100 females, there were 89.2 males. For every 100 females age 18 and over, there were 84.3 males.

The median income for a household in the city was $33,819, and the median income for a family was $39,926. Males had a median income of $28,900 versus $17,431 for females. The per capita income for the city was $17,349. About 10.1% of families and 12.8% of the population were below the poverty line, including 17.2% of those under age 18 and 14.4% of those age 65 or over.

== Notable people ==
- Larry Cole, football player for Dallas Cowboys
- Cecilia H. Hauge, director of nursing for the U.S. Veterans Administration from 1954 to 1966
- David Minge, U.S. representative from Minnesota and judge
- Harland Svare, head coach of the Los Angeles Rams and San Diego Chargers
