= American Association of School Administrators =

Education organization in Alexandria, United States

The American Association of School Administrators (AASA), founded in 1865, is the professional organization for more than 14,000 educational leaders across the United States. AASA's members are chief executive officers and senior-level administrators from school districts in every region of the country, in rural, urban, and suburban settings. AASA's mission is to support and develop effective school system leaders who are dedicated to the highest quality public education for all children. AASA publishes the magazine School Administrator.

AASA is now a member of the National Coalition Against Censorship.

== Legislation ==
On April 1, 2014, the Success and Opportunity through Quality Charter Schools Act (H.R. 10; 113th Congress) was introduced into the United States House of Representatives, where it passed on May 7, 2014. The bill would amend and reauthorize both the Charter School Programs and the Credit Enhancement for Charter School Initiatives, under Title V of the Elementary and Secondary Education Act of 1965 through fiscal year 2020 and combine them into a single authorization. This is intended to streamline and improve the grants process, and increase the funding for these programs from $250 million to $300 million. The AASA opposed the bill, arguing that the bill did not have sufficient provisions in it to make sure tax dollars were being spent correctly, although they conceded the bill was an improvement over current law.

== See also ==
- American Federation of School Administrators
