= Success and Opportunity through Quality Charter Schools Act =

United States legislative Act

- Long title: To amend the charter school program under the Elementary and Secondary Education Act of 1965.
- Announced in: the 113th United States Congress
- Sponsored by: Rep. John Kline (R, MN-2)
- Number of co-sponsors: 1

Codification
- U.S.C. sections affected: 20 U.S.C. § 7221d, 20 U.S.C. § 7221g, 20 U.S.C. § 7221a, 20 U.S.C. § 7223 et seq., 20 U.S.C. § 1232, and others.
- Agencies affected: United States Department of Education
- Authorizations of appropriations: $1,800,000,000 for each of fiscal years 2015, 2016, 2017, 2018, 2019 and 2020

Legislative history
- Introduced in the House as H.R. 10 by Rep. John Kline (R, MN-2) on April 1, 2014; Committee consideration by United States House Committee on Education and the Workforce, United States Senate Committee on Health, Education, Labor, and Pensions; Passed the House on May 9, 2014 (Roll Call Vote 217: 360-45)

The Success and Opportunity through Quality Charter Schools Act (H.R. 10) is a bill that would amend and reauthorize both the Charter School Programs and the Credit Enhancement for Charter School Initiatives under Title V of the Elementary and Secondary Education Act of 1965 through fiscal year 2020 and combine them into a single authorization. This is intended to streamline and improve the grants process and increase the funding for these programs from $250 million to $300 million.

The bill was introduced in the United States House of Representatives during the 113th United States Congress.

== Background ==
Charter schools in the United States offer primary or secondary education without charge to pupils who take state-mandated exams. These charter schools are subject to fewer rules, regulations, and statutes than traditional state schools, and receive public funding, typically a fixed amount per pupil. They are non-profits but they may be managed by for-profit entities in many districts and states, and they can receive donations from private sources.

In 2013–2014, there were an estimated 6,400 American charter schools with a total of 2.5 million students. Waiting lists grew from an average of 233 in 2009 to 277 in 2012, with places allocated by lottery. They educate the majority of children in New Orleans Public Schools. Charter schools may provide a specialized curriculum (for example in arts, mathematics, or vocational training), however others aim to provide a better and more cost-efficient general education than nearby non-charter public schools.

Charter schools may be founded by teachers, parents, or activists although state-authorized charters (schools not chartered by local school districts) are often established by non-profit groups, universities, or government entities. School districts may permit corporations to manage multiple charter schools. The first charter school law was in Minnesota in 1991.

== Provisions of the bill ==
This summary is based largely on the summary provided by the Congressional Research Service, a public domain source.

The Success and Opportunity through Quality Charter Schools Act would, in section 4, revise subpart 1 (Charter School Program) of part B (Public Charter Schools) of title V (Promoting Informed Parental Choice and Innovative Programs) of the Elementary and Secondary Education Act of 1965.

Section 5 would replace the current charter school grant program with a program awarding grants to state entities (state educational agencies, state charter school boards, Governors, or charter school support organizations) and, through them, subgrants to charter school developers to open new charter schools and expand and replicate high-quality charter schools.

The bill would require grantees to: (1) use 7% of the grant funds to provide technical assistance to subgrantees and authorized public chartering agencies, and (2) work with those agencies to improve the charter school authorization process.

The bill would limit the duration of charter school grants and subgrants to no more than five years. Gives subgrantees no more than 18 months to plan and design their programs.

The bill would limit grantees to no more than one grant over a five-year period. Limits subgrantees to no more than one subgrant per charter school over a five-year period, unless the subgrantee demonstrates at least three years of improved educational results for students enrolled in the applicable charter school.

The bill would require the Secretary of Education and each grantee to use a peer review process to review applications for charter school grants and subgrants.

The bill would require grantees to award subgrants in a manner that ensures, to the extent possible, that subgrants are distributed to different areas and assist charter schools representing a variety of educational approaches.

The bill would permit the Secretary to waive certain statutory or regulatory requirements if the waiver is requested by a grant applicant and promotes the purpose of the Charter School program without tampering with what is definitionally required of charter schools.

The bill would direct the Secretary to give priority to grant applicants to the extent that they are from states that:

- have a quality authorized public chartering agency that is not a local educational agency (LEA), if the state allows entities other than LEAs to be authorized public chartering agencies;
- do not impose any limitation on the number or percentage of charter schools that may exist or the number or percentage of students that may attend charter schools;
- ensure equitable financing, as compared to traditional public schools, for charter schools and students in a prompt manner; and
- use charter schools and best practices from charter schools to help improve struggling schools and LEAs.

The bill would direct the Secretary to give priority to grant applicants also to the extent that they:

- partner with an organization experienced in developing management organizations to support charter school development,
- support charter schools that support at-risk students,
- authorize all their charter schools to serve as school food authorities, and
- take steps to ensure that all authorizing public chartering agencies implement best practices for charter school authorizing.

Section 6 would subsume subpart 2 (Credit Enhancement Initiatives to Assist Charter School Facility Acquisition, Construction, and Renovation) of part B of title V under subpart 1. (Under subpart 2, the Secretary awards grants to public entities and private nonprofit entities to demonstrate innovative means of enhancing credit to finance the acquisition, construction, or renovation of charter schools.)

The bill would require the Secretary to award credit enhancement grants to applicants that have the highest-quality applications after considering the diversity of such applications. (Currently, the Secretary is required to award at least three grants, including at least one to a public entity, one to a private nonprofit entity, and one to a consortium of such entities, provided an application from each merits approval.)

The bill would prohibit grant recipients from using more than 2.5% (currently, 0.25%) of their grant for administrative costs.

The bill would revise the per-pupil facilities aid program (under which the Secretary makes competitive matching grants to states to provide per-pupil financing to charter schools) to allow states to: (1) partner with organizations to provide up to 50% of the state share of funding for the program; and (2) receive more than one program grant, so long as the amount of the grant funds provided to charter schools increases with each successive grant.

The bill would allow states that are required by state law to provide charter schools with access to adequate facility space to qualify for a grant under the program even if they do not have a per-pupil facilities aid program for charter schools specified in state law, provided they agree to use the funds to develop such a program.

Section 7 would require the Secretary to conduct national activities that include:

- providing state entities with technical assistance in awarding subgrants to charter school developers;
- providing technical assistance to grantees under the credit enhancement and per-pupil facilities aid programs;
- disseminating best practices;
- evaluating the charter school program's impact, including its impact on student achievement; and
- awarding competitive grants directly to charter school developers (in states that have not applied for or received a charter school grant) and to charter management organizations to open, replicate, and expand charter schools.

Section 8 would require states and LEAs to ensure that a student's records are transferred as quickly as possible to a charter school or another public school when the student transfers from one such school to the other.

Section 9 would allow charter schools to serve prekindergarten or postsecondary school students.

The bill would define a "charter management organization" as a nonprofit organization that manages a network of charter schools linked by centralized support, operations, and oversight.

Section 10 would reauthorize appropriations under subpart 1 through FY2020.

The bill would direct the Secretary to use: (1) 12.5% of such funding for credit enhancement grants and the per-pupil facilities aid program, (2) up to 10% of such funding for the Secretary's national activities, and (3) the remaining funds for the charter school grant program.

== Congressional Budget Office report ==
This summary is based largely on the summary provided by the Congressional Budget Office, as ordered reported by the House Committee on Education and the Workforce on April 8, 2014. This is a public domain source.

H.R. 10 would amend and reauthorize both the Charter School Programs and the Credit Enhancement for Charter School Initiatives under Title V of the Elementary and Secondary Education Act of 1965 through fiscal year 2020 and combine them into a single authorization. (This authorization would automatically be extended one year through 2021 under the General Education Provisions Act.) The bill would authorize the appropriation of $300 million for each of fiscal years 2015 through 2021 for grants to states to develop and expand charter school facilities and to public and private nonprofit entities to develop means of enhancing credit to finance the construction and renovation of charter schools.

== Procedural history ==
The Success and Opportunity through Quality Charter Schools Act was introduced into the United States House of Representatives on April 1, 2014, by Rep. John Kline (R, MN-2). It was referred to the United States House Committee on Education and the Workforce. On April 29, 2014, the bill was reported (amended) alongside House Report 113-423. After debating and further amending the bill on May 7 and 8, 2014, the House voted in Roll Call Vote 217 on May 9, 2014, to pass the bill 360–45.

The bill was received in the United States Senate on May 12, 2014, and referred to the United States Senate Committee on Health, Education, Labor, and Pensions.

== Debate and discussion ==
House Majority Leader Eric Cantor said that "a great education is the foundation that Americans need to climb the economic ladder of success, and to build a bright future" and that this bill would "bring more opportunities to students all over America who are looking for that chance to learn, to grow and to succeed." Speaker of the House John Boehner (R-OH) argued that competition amongst public schools and charter schools was positive because "when parents have choices, kids get a better education."

Rep. Bill Cassidy (R-LA) authored an amendment regarding tracking spending on administrative costs designed to prevent administrative costs from getting too large. Cassidy said that "it is simple and straightforward, ensuring the millions of taxpayers dollars will go to classrooms, not caught up in bureaucracy."

The American Association of School Administrators opposed the bill, arguing that the bill did not have sufficient provisions in it to make sure tax dollars were being spent correctly, although they conceded the bill was an improvement over current law.

The Center for Education Reform was critical of the bill, cautioning that "it is nothing more than a natural progression of the federal government becoming too involved in charter school policy. The organization argued that "the federal government is taking too much of a direct role in defining 'quality' and 'high performance' charter schools," taking away power from the states to make their own decisions about what charter schools qualify for grants. They argued that this takes away the autonomy and innovation that define charter schools, discounts parental choices about schools, and, due to the formulaic nature of these evaluations, discourages charter management organizations from taking over failing schools (since the failing school will hurt their scores).

Supporters of the bill think the additional funding would be a good way to reduce the waiting list of 1 million children national who want to enroll in public charter schools.

== See also ==
- List of bills in the 113th United States Congress
- Charter schools in the United States
- Education in the United States
