= David Minge =

American politician (born 1942)

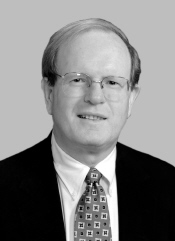

Member of the U.S. House of Representatives from Minnesota's 2nd district
- In office January 3, 1993 – January 3, 2001
- Preceded by: Vin Weber
- Succeeded by: Mark Kennedy

Personal details
- Born: David Raymond Minge; March 19, 1942 (age 84) Clarkfield, Minnesota, U.S.
- Party: Democratic
- Spouse: Karen Aaker
- Children: 2
- Education: St. Olaf College (BA); University of Chicago (JD)

David Raymond Minge (/ˈmɪŋi/ MING-ee; born March 19, 1942) is an American former judge and politician. David Minge served as a judge on the Minnesota Court of Appeals from 2002 until retiring at the end of March 2012. Previously, Minge was a Democratic–Farmer–Labor Party member of the United States House of Representatives serving in the 103rd, 104th, 105th, and 106th congresses, from 1993–2001, representing Minnesota's 2nd congressional district.

== Early life and education ==
Minge was born in Clarkfield, Minnesota and raised in Worthington, Minnesota. He graduated with a bachelor's degree from St. Olaf College and J.D. from the University of Chicago Law School.

== Legal career ==
After earning his Juris Doctor, he moved to Minneapolis, Minnesota where he practiced law for several years. He was then offered a teaching position at the University of Wyoming Law School where he taught for seven years. David Minge then moved to Montevideo, Minnesota where he was part of a country law practice, on the school board, and actively involved in community affairs. During this time he was also a consultant to the House Judiciary Committee.

== Political career ==
He served on the Montevideo School Board from 1989 to 1992.

Minge was sworn into the House in 1993, and he became part of the Blue Dog Coalition consisting of moderate and conservative congressional Democrats. He was a champion of the Conservation Reserve Enhancement Program (CREP), a federal-state partnership to improve water quality and protect the environment. Minge narrowly lost his campaign for a fifth term to Mark Kennedy in 2000. After his first election to the House, Minge opened a congressional field office in Windom, Minnesota at which point the Windom City Council declared March 20, 1993 as "Congressman David Minge Day".

== State judicial service ==
In 2002, Governor Jesse Ventura appointed Minge to the Minnesota Court of Appeals from the second congressional district, the same area where he served in Congress. In 2012, he retired from active status.

== Post political career ==
He currently serves on the board of directors of the Committee for a Responsible Federal Budget.

== Personal life ==
He is married to Karen Aaker Minge, originally of Gaylord, Minnesota. They have two sons. His grandson, Chris, is the CTO of a legal-tech start-up, Vulcan Technologies.

== Electoral history ==
Minnesota's 2nd congressional district: Results 1992–2000
Year	DFL	Votes	Pct	Republican	Votes	Pct	3rd Party	Party	Votes	Pct		3rd Party	Party	Votes	Pct	
1992	David Minge	132,156	48%	Cal R. Ludeman	131,587	48%	Stan Bentz	Independent	12,246	4%	*					
1994	David Minge	114,289	52%	Gary B. Revier	98,881	45%	Stan Bentz	Independent	6,535	3%	*					
1996	David Minge	144,083	55%	Gary B. Revier	107,807	41%	Stan Bentz	Reform	10,283	4%	*					
1998	David Minge	148,933	57%	Craig Duehring	99,490	38%	Stan Bentz	Reform	12,319	5%	*					
2000	David Minge	138,802	48%	Mark Kennedy	138,957	48%	Gerald Brekke	Independence	7,875	3%		Ron Helwig	Libertarian	1,929	1%	*

*Write-in and minor candidate notes: In 1992, write-ins received 414 votes. In 1994, write-ins received 80 votes. In 1996, write-ins received 180 votes. In 1998, write-ins received 385 votes. In 2000, Constitution Party candidate Dennis A. Burda received 1,337 votes.

== Papers ==
David Minge's congressional files are available for research use. They include correspondence, subject files, legislative files, campaign files, press office files, photographs and video and sound recordings.

U.S. House of Representatives
Preceded by Vin Weber	Member of the U.S. House of Representatives from Minnesota's 2nd congressional district 1993–2001	Succeeded by Mark Kennedy
U.S. order of precedence (ceremonial)
Preceded by Tom Hagedorn as Former U.S. Representative	Order of precedence of the United States as Former U.S. Representative	Succeeded by Bill Luther as Former U.S. Representative
