= Judy Traub =

American politician

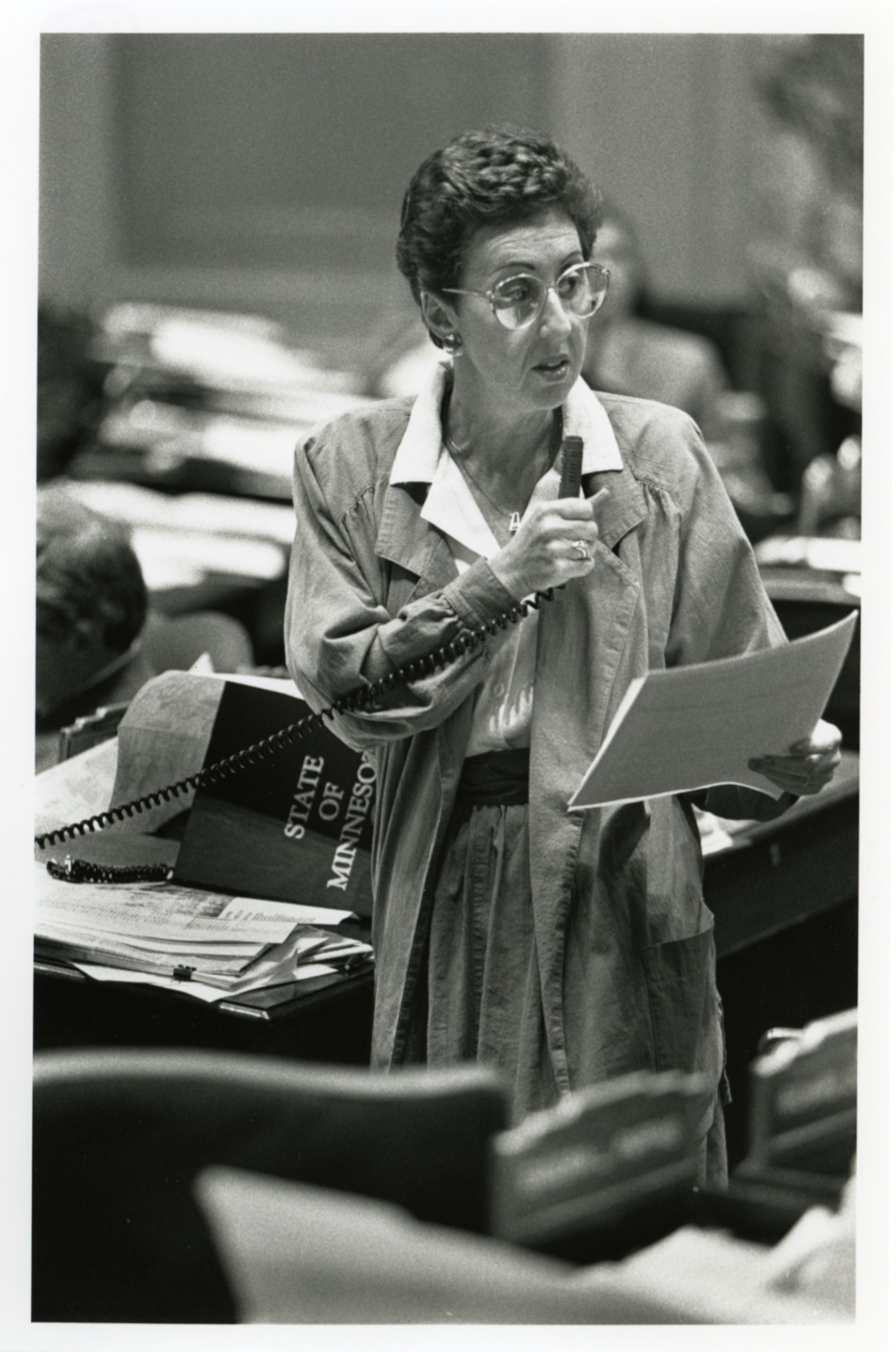

Member of the Minnesota Senate from the 45th district
- In office January 8, 1991 – January 4, 1993
- Preceded by: Jim Ramstad
- Succeeded by: Martha Robertson

Personal details
- Born: June 2, 1940 (age 86)
- Party: Democrat
- Children: 2
- Education: Brandeis University
- Occupation: Community volunteer

Judy Traub (born June 2, 1940) is an American politician and community volunteer.

Traub was born in Boston, Massachusetts and graduated from Brandeis University. She lived in Minnetonka, Minnesota, with her husband Fred and their children, and was a community volunteer. Traub served in the Minnesota Senate in 1991 and 1992 and was a Democrat. Traub then moved to Wellington, Florida, with her husband, and continued to be a community volunteer.
