= Dan Stevens (Minnesota politician) =

American politician

Member of the Minnesota Senate from the 17th district
- In office 1993–1997
- In office 1997–2002

Personal details
- Born: February 23, 1950 (age 76) Chisago County, Minnesota, U.S.
- Party: Republican
- Spouse: Barb Stevens
- Children: 4
- Education: University of Minnesota
- Occupation: Business Manager, farmer

Daniel Lee Stevens (born February 23, 1950) is an American politician in the state of Minnesota. He served in the Minnesota State Senate.

== Biography ==
Dan was a member of the Minnesota Senate and represented the 17th district, which includes areas of Benton, Kanabec, Mille Lacs, Morrison, and Sherburne counties.

An independent republican, he is currently retired and resides in Mora, Minnesota.

=== Personal life ===
Dan was born to Irvin (Bud) and Barbara Stevens in 1950. He grew up on a dairy farm in Rock Creek, Minnesota.

=== Education ===
After going to a country school near the family farm for the first few years, he transferred to the Pine City school district, graduating in 1967. After graduating from high school Dan attended the University of Minnesota.

=== Minnesota Senate ===
https://www.lrl.mn.gov/legdb/fulldetail?id=10655

Dan was first elected to the Minnesota Senate in 1992 from district 8B. He defeated the incumbent, Tim Faust, by a margin of 8673 (55.92%) to 6786 (43.76%). Dan ran on a platform of improving the Minnesota business climate, controlling spending and keeping taxes lower.

Stevens was named the 2000 Legislator of the Year by the Minnesota Association of Soil and Water Conservation Districts.

He had become one of the Legislature's leading authorities on long-term care, heading a task force and pushing for reform on the issue. Stevens was also known for his willingness to take on groups like the Sierra Club, who disagreed with his approach to environmental issues.

A pioneer in welfare reform, Stevens successfully authored legislation to crack down on deadbeat parents, mandate community service for some welfare recipients and provide child care for low income parents who work. In addition to long-term care reform, Stevens' legislative priorities include protecting private property rights, reforming elections, establishing a citizen oversight board for the Department of Natural Resources and simplifying Minnesota's wetland regulatory process

In 2002, Stevens unsuccessfully ran for US Congress for Minnesota's 7 Congressional District.

=== Passed Bills Authored and Co-authored ===
==== Bills Authored: ====
Introduced - 02/14/2002 / Passed 04/03/2002 - Uniform municipal contracting law exemption for water storage tank service contracts; Walker Ah-Gwah-Ching water tower maintenance and operation agreement

Introduced - 02/18/2002 - Food handlers license prepared food sales exemption limits and labeling requirements modification

==== Bills Co-Authored: ====
Introduced - 03/29/2001 / Passed 04/03/2002 - Technology circuits or systems contractors and power limited technicians

Introduced - 02/04/2002 / Passed 03/26/2002 - Veterans homes discretionary admissions means of support exclusions expansion

Introduced - 03/08/2001 / Passed 04/17/2002 - Nursing home administrators requirements modification
