= CREP =

The Conservation Reserve Enhancement Program (CREP) is run by the Farm Service Agency (FSA). The US program provides funds to farmers for the purpose of preserving lands once used for agriculture, with the goal of introducing and encouraging plant life to prevent erosion and provide habitat.
