= Jim Ramstad =

American lawyer and politician (1946–2020)

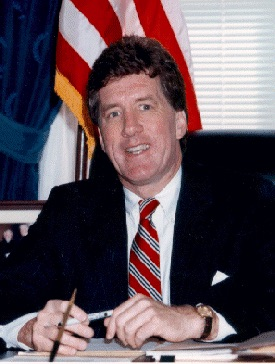

Member of the U.S. House of Representatives from Minnesota's 3rd district
- In office January 3, 1991 – January 3, 2009
- Preceded by: Bill Frenzel
- Succeeded by: Erik Paulsen

Member of the Minnesota Senate
- In office January 6, 1981 – January 3, 1991
- Preceded by: Emily Anne Staples
- Succeeded by: Judy Traub
- Constituency: 43rd district (1981–1983); 45th district (1983–1991)

Personal details
- Born: James Marvin Ramstad; May 6, 1946 Jamestown, North Dakota, U.S.
- Died: November 5, 2020 (aged 74) Wayzata, Minnesota, U.S.
- Party: Republican
- Spouse: Kathryn Mitchell (m. 2005)
- Children: 1
- Education: University of Minnesota (BA); George Washington University (JD)
- Occupation: attorney, political assistant

Military service
- Branch/service: United States Army Reserve
- Years of service: 1968–1975
- Rank: First Lieutenant

James Marvin Ramstad (May 6, 1946 – November 5, 2020) was an American lawyer and politician who represented Minnesota's 3rd congressional district in the United States House of Representatives from 1991 to 2009. A member of the Republican Party, Ramstad served in the Minnesota Senate from 1981 to 1991.

Ramstad was first elected to the Minnesota Senate in 1981 and was reelected until 1990, when he was elected to represent Minnesota’s 3rd congressional district in the U.S. House of Representatives. Ramstad won reelection in the suburban congressional district eight times, all by landslide margins. He had a reputation as a moderate Republican. Ramstad chose to retire and not seek reelection in 2008. He was succeeded by Republican State Representative Erik Paulsen. Throughout his legislative career and later life, Ramstad, empowered by his prior struggles with alcoholism, was a notable advocate for addiction recovery.

In 2020, Ramstad died from Parkinson's disease at the age of 74.

== Early life and education ==
Ramstad was born in Jamestown, North Dakota on May 6, 1946. He was educated at the University of Minnesota and the George Washington University Law School. He was an officer in the United States Army Reserve from 1968 to 1974. He also worked as a private practice attorney and as a legislative aide to the Minnesota House of Representatives.

== Career ==
He served on the Wayzata-Plymouth Chemical Health Commission, Plymouth Human Rights Commission, and the Minnesota State Human Rights Advisory Committee from 1979 to 1980.

Ramstad was a Republican member of the Minnesota State Senate from 1981 to 1990 before entering the U.S. Congress. He served in the 102nd, 103rd, 104th, 105th, 106th, 107th, 108th, 109th, and 110th congresses, beginning on January 3, 1991. He first defeated former Minneapolis city councilman Lou DeMars in the 1990 election.

=== Tenure ===
Ramstad was a member of the United States House of Representatives from 1991 until 2009, representing Minnesota's 3rd congressional district, one of eight congressional districts in Minnesota. On September 17, 2007 Ramstad announced he would not seek reelection in 2008. He reiterated his statement on December 19, 2007.

Ramstad considered ending discrimination against those suffering from mental health and addiction problems a major part of his legacy. He worked under both Republican and Democratic majorities to pass a Mental Health Parity Bill. Mental Health Parity was eventually passed and signed into law in December, 2008.

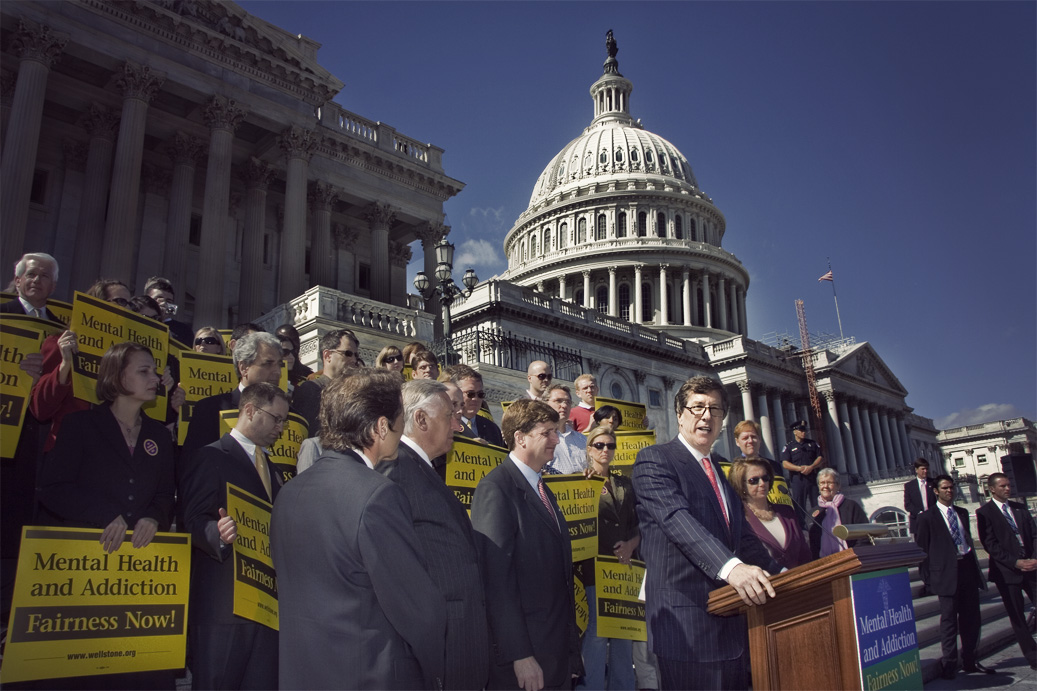
Congressman Jim Ramstad on the steps of the U.S. Capitol w/ Speaker Pelosi, Congressman Kennedy, Majority Leader Hoyer and David Wellstone, son of the late U.S. Senator Paul Wellstone.

Ramstad was mentioned as a possible candidate for Director of the Office of National Drug Control Policy in the administration of President Barack Obama. However, the position eventually went to former Seattle police chief Gil Kerlikowske.

Ramstad considered running for Governor of Minnesota in the 2010 election, but decided not to.

At the time of his death, Ramstad was a resident fellow at the Harvard Institute of Politics where he was leading a study group titled The Policy and Politics of Addiction.

=== Political positions ===
Ramstad was a member of The Republican Main Street Partnership. He was pro-choice and supported embryonic stem cell research. He was opposed to gay marriage. He voted in favor of an amendment to a whistleblower protection bill that would have allowed the government to influence stem-cell research.

He was considered to be the most moderate Republican member of the Minnesota delegation in the 109th Congress, scoring 68 percent conservative by a conservative group and 21% progressive by a liberal group.

== Personal life ==
Ramstad was a recovering alcoholic. For a time, he was Rep. Patrick J. Kennedy's Alcoholics Anonymous sponsor. He was a long-time advocate for addiction treatment and recovery services, and at the time of his death he had been sober for 39 years.

He married Kathryn Mitchell Ramstad in 2005 and they had one daughter, Christen.

Ramstad's sister, Sheryl Ramstad, is a Tax Court judge in Minnesota. Ramstad was a member of the United Church of Christ.

On February 25, 2008, it was announced that Ramstad had been elected to the board of directors of the National Center on Addiction and Substance Abuse at Columbia University.

In 2010, Ramstad joined alliantgroup as a senior advisor on their Strategic Advisory Board.

He died of Parkinson's disease on November 5, 2020, aged 74, at his home in Wayzata, Minnesota.

In 2022, to honor Jim's legacy and further his ideals with the next generation of leaders, his widow Kathryn Ramstad established the Jim Ramstad Institute for Civility and Youth Leadership in the YMCA Center for Youth Voice. The Ramstad Institute exists to perpetuate the ideals Jim embraced in his political leadership: Bipartisanship and Bridge-Building; Ethics and Integrity; Constituent-Centered Leadership; Compassion and Resilience in Leadership; and Legislative Process and Civic Literacy. Each year, the Institute will help train more than 200 young people to be effective servant leaders - leaders like Jim, who encourage others to work together, to trust each other, to listen to each other and to see a vision of what they could achieve together. The Institute will also help fund professional development workshops for secondary teachers and students focusing on the Y’s Respectful Conversations in Schools model.

== Committee assignments ==
- Ways and Means Committee
  - Subcommittee on Oversight (Ranking Member)
  - Subcommittee on Health
- Co-chair of the Addiction Treatment and Recovery Caucus
- Co-chair of the Disabilities Caucus
- Co-chair of the Law Enforcement Caucus
- Co-chair of the Medical Technology Caucus

== Electoral history ==
Minnesota's 3rd congressional district: Results 1990–2006
Year	DFL	Votes	Pct	Republican	Votes	Pct	3rd Party	Party	Votes	Pct	3rd Party	Party	Votes	Pct	
1990	Lou Demars	96,395	33%	Jim Ramstad	195,833	67%	Write-ins		624	<1%					
1992	Paul Mandell	104,606	33%	Jim Ramstad	200,240	64%	Dwight Fellman	Grass Roots	9,164	3%	Write-ins		721	<1%	
1994	Bob Olson	62,211	26%	Jim Ramstad	173,223	73%	Write-ins		1,097	<1%					
1996	Stan J. Leino	87,350	30%	Jim Ramstad	205,816	70%									*
1998	Stan J. Leino	66,505	23%	Jim Ramstad	203,731	72%	Derek W. Schramm	Minnesota Taxpayers	12,823	5%					*
2000	Sue Shuff	98,219	30%	Jim Ramstad	222,571	68%	Bob Odden	Libertarian	5,302	2%	Arne Niska	Constitution	2,970	1%	
2002	Darryl Stanton	82,575	28%	Jim Ramstad	213,334	72%									*
2004	Deborah Watts	126,665	35%	Jim Ramstad	231,871	65%									*
2006	Wendy Wilde	99,588	35%	Jim Ramstad	184,333	65%									*

Write-in and minor candidate notes: In 1996, write-ins received 417 votes. In 1998, write-ins received 250 votes. In 2002, write-ins received 309 votes. In 2004, write-ins received 356 votes. In 2006, write-ins received 323 votes.

U.S. House of Representatives
Preceded by Bill Frenzel	Member of the U.S. House of Representatives from Minnesota's 3rd congressional district January 3, 1991 – January 3, 2009	Succeeded by Erik Paulsen
