= John Kline (politician) =

American politician (born 1947)

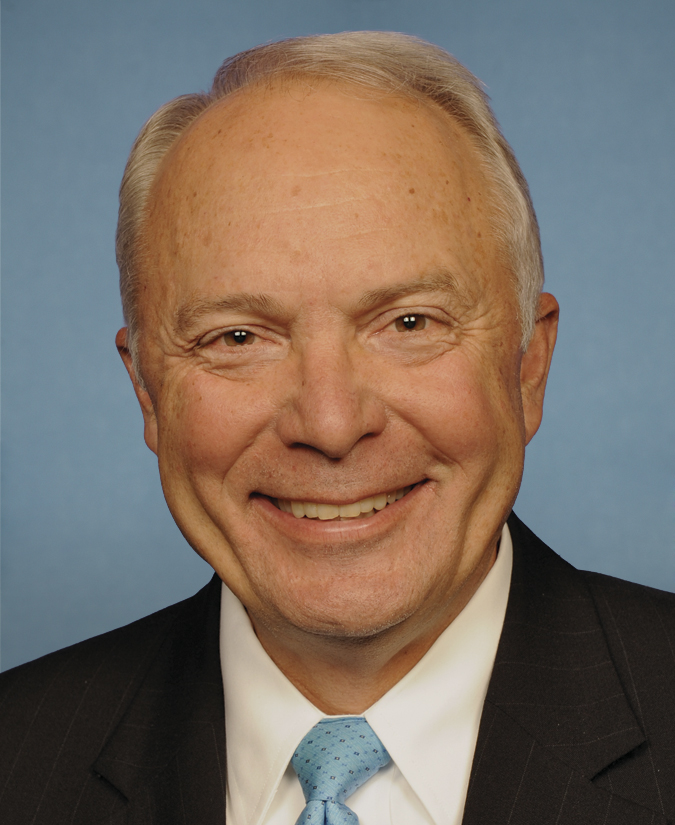

Chair of the House Education Committee
- In office January 3, 2011 – January 3, 2017
- Preceded by: George Miller
- Succeeded by: Virginia Foxx

Member of the U.S. House of Representatives from Minnesota's 2nd district
- In office January 3, 2003 – January 3, 2017
- Preceded by: Bill Luther (redistricted)
- Succeeded by: Jason Lewis

Personal details
- Born: John Paul Kline Jr. September 6, 1947 (age 79) Allentown, Pennsylvania, U.S.
- Party: Republican
- Spouse(s): Christine Lewis (divorced) Vicky Sheldon
- Children: 2
- Education: Rice University (BA); Shippensburg University (MPA)

Military service
- Branch/service: United States Marine Corps
- Years of service: 1969–1994
- Rank: Colonel
- Battles/wars: Vietnam War; Operation Restore Hope
- Awards: Legion of Merit; Meritorious Service Medal; Defense Superior Service Medal; Vietnam Service Medal (3); Vietnam Campaign Medal; Presidential Service Badge; Navy Commendation Medal
- Kline's voice Kline supporting the E. Clay Shaw Jr. Missing Children's Assistance Reauthorization Act of 2013. Recorded September 17, 2013

John Paul Kline Jr. (born September 6, 1947) is an American politician who served as a member of the United States House of Representatives from Minnesota's 2nd congressional district from 2003 to 2017. The district included most of the southern suburbs of the Twin Cities. A member of the Republican Party, Kline served as the Chairman of the House Committee on Education and the Workforce from 2011 until 2017. Kline retired from Congress at the end of his term in January 2017.

== Early life and education ==
Kline was born in Allentown, Pennsylvania, the son of Litta Belle (née Rodman) and John Paul Kline, Sr. He is a 1965 graduate of W. B. Ray High School in Corpus Christi, Texas. He earned a B.A. in biology at Rice University in 1969 and a Master of Public Administration from Shippensburg University of Pennsylvania in 1988.

== Career ==
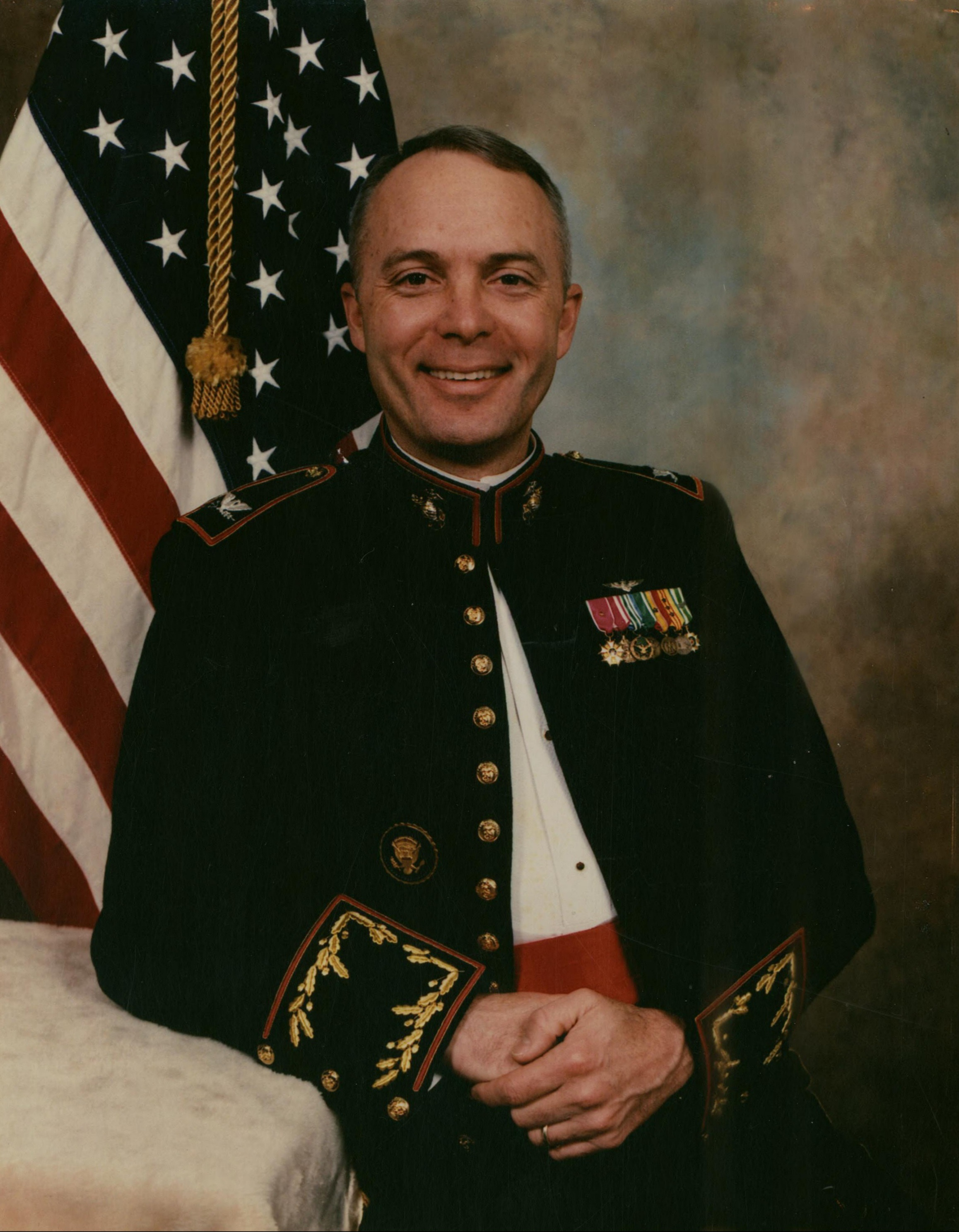
Kline during his time in the US Marines, 1990s

Before his election to Congress, Kline was a 25-year career commissioned officer in the U.S. Marine Corps, where he was a senior military aide to Presidents Carter and Reagan and was responsible for carrying the President's football. During his military career, Kline was a Naval Aviator who served as a helicopter pilot in Vietnam, commanded all Marine aviation forces in Operation Restore Hope in Somalia, flew "Marine One," the Presidential helicopter, in HMX-1, and served as Program Development Officer at Headquarters Marine Corps. He received numerous medals and commendations, including the Defense Superior Service Medal, four awards of the Legion of Merit, the Meritorious Service Medal, the Navy Commendation Medal, three awards of the Vietnam Service Medal, the Vietnam Campaign Medal, and the Presidential Service Badge. Kline retired from the Marine Corps as a colonel.

== Personal life ==
Kline and his second wife, Vicky, live in Burnsville, Minnesota. Kline has two children and four grandchildren. Kline was previously married to Christine Lewis.

== U.S. House of Representatives ==
=== Committee assignments ===
- Committee on Armed Services
  - Subcommittee on Emerging Threats and Capabilities
- Committee on Education and the Workforce (Chair)
  - As Chairman of the full committee, Rep. Kline was entitled as an ex officio member of all subcommittees of which he is not already a voting member.
  - Subcommittee on Early Childhood, Elementary and Secondary Education
  - Subcommittee on Workforce Protections
  - Subcommittee on Higher Education and Workforce Training

=== Caucus memberships ===
- Congressional Constitution Caucus

=== Political positions ===
Kline supported President Bush's plan to increase troop levels in Iraq in January 2007.

During Kline's 2008 bid for reelection he discussed his opposition to earmarks and his refusal to request them for his district.

In 2006, Kline voted to maintain the legal definition of marriage as between one man and one woman. He voted for the Violence Against Women Reauthorization Act of 2013.

Kline opposed restrictions on gun ownership. He voted to repeal parts of the firearms ban for Washington, D.C. He described himself as "a collector of antique guns and a staunch supporter of the Second Amendment".

Kline stated, "Job creation is our nation's no. 1 challenge and Congress must make it our no. 1 priority." He spoke in support of education reform designed to encourage parent involvement and teacher accountability. He opposed any tax increases and stated that such strategies must be taken "off the table." In remarks made to fellow representatives, Kline said, "we are watching a massive growth of government power, size, and spending, and I deem that unacceptable."

In 2013 Kline proposed a bill that, among other adjustments, changed the rate on subsidized Stafford loans from 3.4% to 5.9%. The bill linked the rate of interest to the rate of US borrowing.

Kline voted to repeal the Affordable Care Act. His campaign site stated that "he opposed Obamacare because it is a seriously flawed law that was too big, was passed too fast, and does too much harm."

=== Legislation ===
On April 1, 2014, Kline introduced the Success and Opportunity through Quality Charter Schools Act (H.R. 10; 113th Congress), a bill that would amend and reauthorize both the Charter School Programs and the Credit Enhancement for Charter School Initiatives under Title V of the Elementary and Secondary Education Act of 1965 through fiscal year 2020 and combine them into a single authorization. It was intended to streamline and improve the grants process and increase the funding for these programs from $250 million to $300 million. The bill passed in the House on May 7, 2014.

=== Political campaigns ===
Kline made his first run for office in 1998, when he challenged 6th District Democratic incumbent Bill Luther and lost, taking 46% of the vote. He sought a rematch in 2000 and lost by 5,400 votes, while George W. Bush narrowly carried the district.

After the 2000 census, Minnesota's congressional map was radically altered, though the number of districts was unchanged. The old 28-county 2nd District was dismantled, and a new 2nd District was created in the Twin Cities' southern suburbs. At the same time, the 6th District was pushed slightly north and made significantly more Republican than its predecessor. The remapping left the home of the 2nd District's freshman incumbent, Republican Mark Kennedy, just inside the reconfigured 6th District. Realizing this, Kline immediately filed for the Republican nomination in the new 2nd District; his home had been drawn into this district. After some consideration, Luther opted to run in the 2nd as well, even though it was thought to lean slightly Republican.

During the campaign, Luther came under fire when one of his supporters, Sam Garst, filed for the race under the banner of the "No New Taxes Party." This was done in retaliation for an ad the National Republican Congressional Committee ran in support of Kline that accused Luther of being soft on crime. Luther subsequently admitted that his campaign had known about Garst's false flag campaign. Kline gained considerable momentum from this, and ultimately won handily, taking 53% of the vote to Luther's 42%.

Kline then defeated Democratic Burnsville City Councilwoman Teresa Daly to win a second term in 2004 and former FBI Special agent and whistleblower Coleen Rowley, one of Time magazine's "Persons of the Year", with 56% of the vote in 2006. In 2008 Kline defeated former Watertown mayor Steve Sarvi and increased his margin of victory to over 57% of the vote.

Kline accepted $11,000 in political contributions from former congressman Randy "Duke" Cunningham's PAC. After Cunningham's indictment on fraud charges, Kline donated the money to charity.

Kline's reelection in 2012 made him the 40th U.S. Representative from Minnesota to win six House terms.

On September 3, 2015, Kline announced that he would not seek reelection in 2016.

=== Campaign finance ===
In the 2014 election cycle, Kline's largest campaign contributor was the Apollo Group, a corporation that owns several for-profit educational institutions. The corporation gave $33,100 to Kline's campaign.

=== Bill Maher's "Flip a District" contest ===
In 2014, he was the "winner" of comedian Bill Maher's "Flip a District" from a group of 16 semifinalists nominated by viewers nationwide.

The Star Tribune reported Kline planned to raise $100,000 to counteract the notoriety brought by Maher's campaign. Kline's spokesman said, "Minnesotans are tired of sleazy and slimy politics" but Kline's opponent "certainly isn't." Kline's opponent, Mike Obermueller, reported a 700% increase in fundraising.

== Electoral history ==
2014

In 2014 Kline again faced Democrat Mike Obermuller. This time incumbent Kline defeated Obermuller by a 17-point margin.

2012

In 2012, Kline defeated Democrat Mike Obermueller by 8%.

2010

2008

== See also ==
- List of United States representatives from Minnesota
- Minnesota's congressional delegations

U.S. House of Representatives
Preceded by Mark Kennedy	Member of the U.S. House of Representatives from Minnesota's 2nd congressional district 2003–2017	Succeeded by Jason Lewis
Preceded by George Miller	Chair of the House Education Committee; 2011–2017	Succeeded by Virginia Foxx
U.S. order of precedence (ceremonial)
Preceded by Joe Baca as Former U.S. Representative	Order of precedence of the United States as Former U.S. Representative	Succeeded by Kurt Schrader as Former U.S. Representative
