= Robert N. Lemen =

American politician and businessman (1943–2021)

Robert Norton Lemen III (April 3, 1943 – December 29, 2021) was an American politician and businessman.

Lemen was born in San Antonio, Texas and graduated from John Muir High School in Pasadena, California. He moved to Grand Rapids, Minnesota in 1964 with his wife. Lemen went to Indiana University and graduated from the University of Minnesota North Central School of Agriculture in Grand Rapids, Minnesota. He was a public relations consultant. Lemen served in the Minnesota House of Representatives in 1981 and 1982 and was a Republican. He died at Grand Itasca Hospital in Grand Rapids, Minnesota.
