= Bill Luther =

American politician (born 1945)

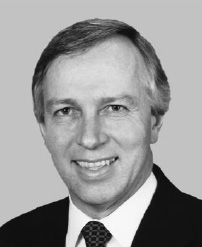

Member of the U.S. House of Representatives from Minnesota's 6th district
- In office January 3, 1995 – January 3, 2003
- Preceded by: Rod Grams
- Succeeded by: John Kline (redistricted)

Member of the Minnesota Senate
- In office January 4, 1977 – January 1, 1995
- Preceded by: Al Kowalczyk
- Succeeded by: Don Kramer
- Constituency: 45th district (1977–1983); 47th district (1983–1995)

Member of the Minnesota House of Representatives from the 45th district Seat B
- In office January 7, 1975 – January 3, 1977
- Preceded by: Ernee McArthur
- Succeeded by: Robert Ellingson

Personal details
- Born: William Paul Luther; June 27, 1945 (age 81) Fergus Falls, Minnesota, U.S.
- Party: Democratic
- Spouse(s): Darlene Luther; Janet Robert
- Education: University of Minnesota (BS, JD)

William Paul Luther (born June 27, 1945) is an American politician and lawyer from Minnesota. Luther was a Democratic-Farmer-Labor Party (DFL) member of the United States House of Representatives representing Minnesota's 6th congressional district from January 3, 1995, to January 3, 2003, serving four consecutive terms.

== Biography ==
Luther was born in Fergus Falls, Minnesota, and was educated at the University of Minnesota, receiving a Bachelor of Science in 1967 and a Juris Doctor from the Law School in 1970.

=== Political career ===
He served on the Minnesota Governor's Council on Consumer Affairs from 1974 to 1975 and was later a member of the Minnesota House of Representatives from 1975 to 1976 and the Minnesota Senate from 1977 to 1994. During his career as a state legislator and a congressman, Luther gained an image as a moderate Democrat.

==== Congress ====
After the 2000 census, Minnesota's congressional map was radically altered, even though the state didn't gain or lose any districts. Luther's 6th District in the northern Twin Cities suburbs was pushed slightly north and made significantly more Republican. After some consideration, Luther opted to run in the newly created 2nd District in the southern suburbs, which contained about 39 percent of his former territory. He faced a rematch against Republican John Kline, his opponent in 1998 and 2000.

During the campaign, Luther came under fire when one of his supporters, Sam Garst, filed for the race under the banner of the "No New Taxes Party." This was done in retaliation for an ad the National Republican Congressional Committee ran in support of Kline that accused Luther of being soft on crime. Luther subsequently admitted that his campaign knew about Garst's false flag campaign. Luther never really recovered and was soundly defeated, taking 42 percent of the vote.

He served in the 104th, 105th, 106th, and 107th congresses.

In 2006, Luther entered the DFL Party primary for the office of Minnesota Attorney General after endorsed candidate Matt Entenza withdrew from the race. He lost the primary to Lori Swanson.

=== Ethics appointment ===
In 2021, he was appointed a member of the Office of Congressional Ethics, a nonpartisan, independent committee charged with overseeing outside ethics complaints against members of Congress. As of 2025, he is serving as co-chair of the office's board.

== Electoral history ==
- 2006 Race for state Attorney General — Democratic Primary
  - Lori Swanson (DFL), 42%
  - Steve Kelley (DFL), 37%
  - Bill Luther (DFL), 21%
- 2002 Race for U.S. House of Representatives — 2nd District
  - John Kline (R), 53%
  - Bill Luther (DFL) (inc.), 42%
- 2000 Race for U.S. House of Representatives — 6th District
  - Bill Luther (DFL) (inc.), 50%
  - John Kline (R), 48%
- 1998 Race for U.S. House of Representatives — 6th District
  - Bill Luther (DFL) (inc.), 50%
  - John Kline (R), 46%
- 1996 Race for U.S. House of Representatives — 6th District
  - Bill Luther (DFL) (inc.), 56%
  - Tad Jude (R), 44%
- 1994 Race for U.S. House of Representatives — 6th District
  - Bill Luther (DFL), 50%
  - Tad Jude (R), 50%

U.S. House of Representatives
Preceded by Rod Grams	Member of the U.S. House of Representatives from Minnesota's 6th congressional district 1995–2003	Succeeded by Mark Kennedy
U.S. order of precedence (ceremonial)
Preceded by David Minge as Former U.S. Representative	Order of precedence of the United States as Former U.S. Representative	Succeeded by Michele Bachmann as Former U.S. Representative
