= 2010 United States gubernatorial elections =

- November 2, 2010

39 governorships 37 states; 2 territories (Note: Including a special election in Utah)
	Majority party	Minority party
Party	Republican	Democratic
Seats before	23 (Note: Governor Charlie Crist of Florida left the Republican Party to become an independent in April 2010.)	26
Seats after	29	20
Seat change	▲6	▼6
Popular vote	33,851,797	33,331,319
Percentage	47.75%	47.02%
Seats up	17	19
Seats won	23	13
	Third party
Party	Independent
Seats before	1
Seats after	1
Seat change	Steady
Popular vote	1,123,209
Percentage	1.58%
Seats up	1
Seats won	1
- Map of the results Democratic gain Republican gain Democratic hold Republican hold Independent gain No election

United States gubernatorial elections were held on November 2, 2010, in 37 states (with a special election in Utah) and two territories. These elections coincided with the elections for the United States Senate and the United States House of Representatives as well as other state and local elections. As in most midterm elections, the party controlling the White House lost ground. Democrats took five governorships from the Republicans, while Republicans took 11 governorships from the Democrats. An independent won one governorship previously held by a Republican, while a Republican won one governorship previously held by an independent. Republicans held a majority of governorships for the first time since before the 2006 elections. One state, Louisiana, had no election for governor, but it did feature a special election for lieutenant governor.

Most gains from both parties were made in races where no incumbent was running, either due to term limits or voluntary retirement. However, Republicans did defeat incumbent Democrats Ted Strickland of Ohio and Chet Culver of Iowa, and held Nevada, where Republican Jim Gibbons lost in the primary.

As of 2026, this is the last time Democrats have won an Arkansas gubernatorial race and the only time since 1998 that Republicans won a Pennsylvania gubernatorial race. This is also the last time a third-party candidate won in Rhode Island.

Republicans held a majority of governorships in every election until 2026.

== Predictions ==
State	Incumbent	Last race	RCP October 20, 2010	Rasmussen October 31, 2010	538 September 25, 2010	Sabato November 1, 2010	Cook October 1, 2010	IE October 28, 2010	CQ April 7, 2010	SSP November 1, 2010	Result
Alabama	Bob Riley (Term-limited)	57.45% R	Safe R	Safe R	Leans R	Likely R	Leans R	Safe R	Leans R	Likely R	Bentley; 57.58% R
Alaska	Sean Parnell	48.3% R	Likely R	Safe R	Safe R	Safe R	Safe R	Safe R	Likely R	Safe R	Parnell (58.9%)
Arizona	Jan Brewer	62.6% D (Note: Democratic governor Janet Napolitano was re-elected in 2006. Brewer succeeded Napolitano when she resigned in 2009.)	Likely R	Safe R	Leans R	Likely R	Likely R	Leans R	Leans R	Leans R	Brewer (54.7%)
Arkansas	Mike Beebe	55.6% D	Likely D	Leans D	Safe D	Likely D	Safe D	Safe D	Safe D	Safe D	Beebe (64.5%)
California	Arnold Schwarzenegger (Term-limited)	55.9% R	Tossup	Leans D (flip)	Tossup	Leans D (flip)	Tossup	Leans D (flip)	Leans D (flip)	Leans D (flip)	Brown (53.1%)
Colorado	Bill Ritter (Retired)	57.0% D	Leans D	Tossup	Leans D	Leans D	Likely D	Leans D	Tossup	Leans D	Hickenlooper (50.7%)
Connecticut	Jodi Rell (Retired)	63.2% R	Leans D (flip)	Tossup	Leans D (flip)	Leans R	Tossup	Tossup	Tossup	Tossup	Malloy (49.6%)
Florida	Charlie Crist (Retired)	52.2% R (Note: Crist was elected as a Republican and switched to Independent in April 2010.)	Tossup	Leans R (flip)	Tossup	Leans R (flip)	Tossup	Tossup	Tossup	Tossup	Scott (48.9%)
Georgia	Sonny Perdue (Term-limited)	57.9% R	Leans R	Leans R	Tossup	Leans R	Tossup	Leans R	Leans R	Leans R	Deal (52.9%)
Hawaii	Linda Lingle (Term-limited)	62.5% R	Tossup	Tossup	Leans D (flip)	Leans D (flip)	Leans D (flip)	Tilt D (flip)	Likely D (flip)	Leans D (flip)	Abercrombie (58.2%)
Idaho	Butch Otter	52.7% R	Safe R	Safe R	Safe R	Likely R	Safe R	Safe R	Likely R	Likely R	Otter (59.1%)
Illinois	Pat Quinn	49.8% D	Tossup	Leans R (flip)	Tossup	Leans R (flip)	Tossup	Tilt R (flip)	Leans D	Tossup	Quinn (46.6%)
Iowa	Chet Culver	54.0% D	Likely R (flip)	Safe R (flip)	Leans R (flip)	Likely R (flip)	Likely R (flip)	Likely R (flip)	Tossup	Leans R (flip)	Branstad (52.8%)
Kansas	Mark Parkinson (Retired)	57.9% D	Safe R (flip)	Safe R (flip)	Safe R (flip)	Safe R (flip)	Safe R (flip)	Safe R (flip)	Likely R (flip)	Safe R (flip)	Brownback (63.4%)
Maine	John Baldacci (Term-limited)	38.1% D	Tossup	Tossup	Leans D	Leans R (flip)	Tossup	Tilt R (flip)	Leans D	Leans R (flip)	LePage (37.6%)
Maryland	Martin O'Malley	52.7% D	Leans D	Leans D	Tossup	Likely D	Tossup	Likely D	Leans D	Leans D	O'Malley (55.8%)
Massachusetts	Deval Patrick	55.6% D	Tossup	Leans D	Tossup	Leans D	Tossup	Tilt D	Tossup	Leans D	Patrick (48.4%)
Michigan	Jennifer Granholm (Term-limited)	56.3% D	Likely R (flip)	Safe R (flip)	Leans R (flip)	Likely R (flip)	Leans R (flip)	Likely R (flip)	Tossup	Likely R (flip)	Snyder (58.1%)
Minnesota	Tim Pawlenty (Retired)	46.7% R	Leans D (flip)	Tossup	Tossup	Leans D (flip)	Tossup	Tilt D (flip)	Tossup	Tossup	Dayton (43.7%)
Nebraska	Dave Heineman	73.4% R	Safe R	Safe R	Safe R	Safe R	Safe R	Safe R	Safe R	Safe R	Heineman (74.3%)
Nevada	Jim Gibbons (Lost renomination)	47.9% R	Likely R	Safe R	Leans R	Likely R	Tossup	Safe R	Tossup	Likely R	Sandoval (53.4%)
New Hampshire	John Lynch	70.1% D	Likely D	Safe D	Leans D	Leans D	Tossup	Leans D	Likely D	Leans D	Lynch (52.6%)
New Mexico	Bill Richardson (Term-limited)	68.8% D	Leans R (flip)	Leans R (flip)	Tossup	Likely R (flip)	Tossup	Leans R (flip)	Likely D	Leans R (flip)	Martinez (53.6%)
New York	David Paterson (Retired)	65.3% D	Likely D	Safe D	Safe D	Safe D	Safe D	Safe D	Likely D	Likely D	Cuomo (61.4%)
Ohio	Ted Strickland	60.5% D	Leans R (flip)	Tossup	Tossup	Leans R (flip)	Tossup	Tilt R (flip)	Tossup	Tossup	Kasich (49.4%)
Oklahoma	Brad Henry (Term-limited)	66.5% D	Safe R (flip)	Safe R (flip)	Leans R (flip)	Likely R (flip)	Leans R (flip)	Safe R (flip)	Leans R (flip)	Likely R (flip)	Fallin (60.1%)
Oregon	Ted Kulongoski (Term-limited)	50.7% D	Tossup	Tossup	Leans D	Leans R (flip)	Tossup	Tossup	Leans D	Tossup	Kitzhaber (49.2%)
Pennsylvania	Ed Rendell (Term-limited)	60.4% D	Leans R (flip)	Safe R (flip)	Leans R (flip)	Likely R (flip)	Leans R (flip)	Leans R (flip)	Leans R (flip)	Leans R (flip)	Corbett (54.5%)
Rhode Island	Don Carcieri (Term-limited)	51.0% R	Tossup	Tossup	Tossup	Leans I (flip)	Tossup	Leans I (flip)	Tossup	Leans I (flip)	Chafee (36.1%)
South Carolina	Mark Sanford (Term-limited)	55.1% R	Leans R	Safe R	Leans R	Likely R	Likely R	Safe R	Leans R	Leans R	Haley (51.4%)
South Dakota	Mike Rounds (Term-limited)	61.7% R	Safe R	Safe R	Safe R	Likely R	Likely R	Safe R	Likely R	Likely R	Daugaard (61.5%)
Tennessee	Phil Bredesen (Term-limited)	68.6% D	Safe R (flip)	Safe R (flip)	Leans R (flip)	Likely R (flip)	Likely R (flip)	Safe R (flip)	Leans R (flip)	Safe R (flip)	Haslam (65.0%)
Texas	Rick Perry	39.0% R	Leans R	Safe R	Tossup	Likely R	Tossup	Leans R	Leans R	Leans R	Perry (55.1%)
Utah (special)	Gary Herbert	77.6% R	Safe R	Safe R	Safe R	Safe R	Safe R	Safe R	Safe R	Likely R	Herbert (64.2%)
Vermont	Jim Douglas (Retired)	53.4% R	Tossup	Tossup	Tossup	Leans D (flip)	Tossup	Tilt D (flip)	Tossup	Tossup	Shumlin (49.6%)
Wisconsin	Jim Doyle (Retired)	52.7% D	Leans R (flip)	Leans R (flip)	Tossup	Likely R (flip)	Tossup	Leans R (flip)	Tossup	Leans R (flip)	Walker (52.3%)
Wyoming	Dave Freudenthal (Term-limited)	70.0% D	Safe R (flip)	Safe R (flip)	Safe R (flip)	Safe R (flip)	Safe R (flip)	Safe R (flip)	Safe R (flip)	Safe R (flip)	Mead (71.6%)

== Race summary ==
Vote by county (click image for more details)

=== States ===
State	Incumbent	Party	First elected	Result	Candidates
Alabama	Bob Riley	Republican	2002	Incumbent term-limited. New governor elected. Republican hold.	▌ ✓ Robert J. Bentley (Republican) 57.9%; ▌Ron Sparks (Democratic) 42.1%
Alaska	Sean Parnell	Republican	2009 (Note: Parnell took office after his predecessor (Sarah Palin) resigned.)	Incumbent elected to full term.	▌ ✓ Sean Parnell (Republican) 59.1%; ▌Ethan Berkowitz (Democratic) 37.7%; ▌Don Wright (Independence) 1.9%; ▌Billy Toien (Libertarian) 1.1%
Arizona	Jan Brewer	Republican	2009 (Note: Brewer took office after her predecessor (Janet Napolitano) resigned.)	Incumbent elected to full term.	▌ ✓ Jan Brewer (Republican) 54.3%; ▌Terry Goddard (Democratic) 42.4%; ▌Barry Hess (Libertarian) 2.2%
Arkansas	Mike Beebe	Democratic	2006	Incumbent re-elected.	▌ ✓ Mike Beebe (Democratic) 64.4%; ▌Jim Keet (Republican) 33.6%; ▌Jim Lendall (Green) 1.9%
California	Arnold Schwarzenegger	Republican	2003 (recall)	Incumbent term-limited. New governor elected. Democratic gain.	▌ ✓ Jerry Brown (Democratic) 53.8%; ▌Meg Whitman (Republican) 40.9%; ▌Chelene Nightingale (American Ind.) 1.7%; ▌Dale Ogden (Libertarian) 1.5%; ▌Laura Wells (Green) 1.3%
Colorado	Bill Ritter	Democratic	2006	Incumbent retired. New governor elected. Democratic hold.	▌ ✓ John Hickenlooper (Democratic) 51.1%; ▌Tom Tancredo (Constitution) 36.4%; ▌Dan Maes (Republican) 11.1%
Connecticut	Jodi Rell	Republican	2004 (Note: Bell took office after her predecessor (John G. Rowland) resigned. She was subsequently elected in the 2006 Connecticut gubernatorial election.)	Incumbent retired. New governor elected. Democratic gain.	▌ ✓ Dannel Malloy (Democratic) 49.5%; ▌Thomas C. Foley (Republican) 49.0%; ▌Thomas E. Marsh (Independent) 1.5%
Florida	Charlie Crist	Independent	2006 (Note: Crist was elected as a Republican in 2006. He became an independent in April 2010.)	Incumbent retired to run for U.S. Senator. New governor elected. Republican gain.	▌ ✓ Rick Scott (Republican) 48.9%; ▌Alex Sink (Democratic) 47.7%; ▌Peter Allen (Independence) 2.3%
Georgia	Sonny Perdue	Republican	2002	Incumbent term-limited. New governor elected. Republican hold.	▌ ✓ Nathan Deal (Republican) 53.0%; ▌Roy Barnes (Democratic) 43.0%; ▌John Monds (Libertarian) 4.0%
Hawaii	Linda Lingle	Republican	2002	Incumbent term-limited. New governor elected. Democratic gain.	▌ ✓ Neil Abercrombie (Democratic) 57.8%; ▌Duke Aiona (Republican) 40.8%
Idaho	Butch Otter	Republican	2006	Incumbent re-elected.	▌ ✓ Butch Otter (Republican) 59.1%; ▌Keith G. Allred (Democratic) 32.9%; ▌Jana M. Kemp (Independent) 5.9%; ▌Ted Dunlap (Libertarian) 1.3%
Illinois	Pat Quinn	Democratic	2009 (Note: Quinn took office after his predecessor (Rod Blagojevich) was removed from office.)	Incumbent elected to full term.	▌ ✓ Pat Quinn (Democratic) 46.8%; ▌Bill Brady (Republican) 45.9%; ▌Scott Lee Cohen (Independent) 3.6%; ▌Rich Whitney (Green) 2.7%
Iowa	Chet Culver	Democratic	2006	Incumbent lost re-election. New governor elected. Republican gain.	▌ ✓ Terry Branstad (Republican) 52.8%; ▌Chet Culver (Democratic) 43.2%; ▌Jonathan Narcisse (Iowa) 1.9%; ▌Eric Cooper (Libertarian) 1.3%
Kansas	Mark Parkinson	Democratic	2009 (Note: Parkinson took office after his predecessor (Kathleen Sebelius) resigned.)	Incumbent retired. New governor elected. Republican gain.	▌ ✓ Sam Brownback (Republican) 63.3%; ▌Tom Holland (Democratic) 32.2%; ▌Andrew P. Gray (Libertarian) 2.7%; ▌Kenneth W. Cannon (Reform) 1.9%
Maine	John Baldacci	Democratic	2002	Incumbent term-limited. New governor elected. Republican gain.	▌ ✓ Paul LePage (Republican) 37.6%; ▌Eliot Cutler (Independent) 35.9%; ▌Libby Mitchell (Democratic) 18.8%; ▌Shawn Moody (Independent) 5.0%; ▌Kevin Scott (Independent) 1.0%
Maryland	Martin O'Malley	Democratic	2006	Incumbent re-elected.	▌ ✓ Martin O'Malley (Democratic) 56.2%; ▌Bob Ehrlich (Republican) 41.8%
Massachusetts	Deval Patrick	Democratic	2006	Incumbent re-elected.	▌ ✓ Deval Patrick (Democratic) 48.4%; ▌Charlie Baker (Republican) 42.0%; ▌Tim Cahill (Independent) 8.0%; ▌Jill Stein (Green) 1.4%
Michigan	Jennifer Granholm	Democratic	2002	Incumbent term-limited. New governor elected. Republican gain.	▌ ✓ Rick Snyder (Republican) 58.1%; ▌Virg Bernero (Democratic) 39.9%
Minnesota	Tim Pawlenty	Republican	2002	Incumbent retired. New governor elected. DFL gain.	▌ ✓ Mark Dayton (DFL) 43.6%; ▌Tom Emmer (Republican) 43.2%; ▌Tom Horner (Independence) 11.9%
Nebraska	Dave Heineman	Republican	2005 (Note: Heineman took office after his predecessor (Mike Johanns) resigned. He was subsequently elected in the 2006 Nebraska gubernatorial election.)	Incumbent re-elected.	▌ ✓ Dave Heineman (Republican) 73.9%; ▌Mike Meister (Democratic) 26.1%
Nevada	Jim Gibbons	Republican	2006	Incumbent lost renomination. New governor elected. Republican hold.	▌ ✓ Brian Sandoval (Republican) 53.4%; ▌Rory Reid (Democratic) 41.6%
New Hampshire	John Lynch	Democratic	2004	Incumbent re-elected.	▌ ✓ John Lynch (Democratic) 52.6%; ▌John Stephen (Republican) 45.0%; ▌John Babiarz (Libertarian) 2.2%
New Mexico	Bill Richardson	Democratic	2002	Incumbent term-limited. New governor elected. Republican gain.	▌ ✓ Susana Martinez (Republican) 53.3%; ▌Diane Denish (Democratic) 46.6%
New York	David Paterson	Democratic	2008 (Note: Paterson took office after his predecessor (Eliot Spitzer) resigned.)	Incumbent retired. New governor elected. Democratic hold.	▌ ✓ Andrew Cuomo (Democratic) 63.1%; ▌Carl Paladino (Republican) 33.5%; ▌Howie Hawkins (Green) 1.3%; ▌Warren Redlich (Libertarian) 1.1%
Ohio	Ted Strickland	Democratic	2006	Incumbent lost re-election. New governor elected. Republican gain.	▌ ✓ John Kasich (Republican) 49.0%; ▌Ted Strickland (Democratic) 47.0%; ▌Ken Matesz (Libertarian) 2.4%; ▌Dennis Spisak (Green) 1.5%
Oklahoma	Brad Henry	Democratic	2002	Incumbent term-limited. New governor elected. Republican gain.	▌ ✓ Mary Fallin (Republican) 60.5%; ▌Jari Askins (Democratic) 39.5%
Oregon	Ted Kulongoski	Democratic	2002	Incumbent term-limited. New governor elected. Democratic hold.	▌ ✓ John Kitzhaber (Democratic) 49.3%; ▌Chris Dudley (Republican) 47.8%; ▌Greg Kord (Constitution) 1.4%; ▌Wes Wagner (Libertarian) 1.3%
Pennsylvania	Ed Rendell	Democratic	2002	Incumbent term-limited. New governor elected. Republican gain.	▌ ✓ Tom Corbett (Republican) 54.5%; ▌Dan Onorato (Democratic) 45.5%
Rhode Island	Donald Carcieri	Republican	2002	Incumbent term-limited. New governor elected. Independent gain.	▌ ✓ Lincoln Chafee (Independent) 36.1%; ▌John Robitaille (Republican) 33.6%; ▌Frank T. Caprio (Democratic) 23.1%; ▌Ken Block (Moderate) 6.5%
South Carolina	Mark Sanford	Republican	2002	Incumbent term-limited. New governor elected. Republican hold.	▌ ✓ Nikki Haley (Republican) 51.4%; ▌Vincent Sheheen (Democratic) 46.9%; ▌Morgan B. Reeves (United Citizens) 1.5%
South Dakota	Mike Rounds	Republican	2002	Incumbent term-limited. New governor elected. Republican hold.	▌ ✓ Dennis Daugaard (Republican) 61.5%; ▌Scott Heidepriem (Democratic) 38.5%
Tennessee	Phil Bredesen	Democratic	2002	Incumbent term-limited. New governor elected. Republican gain.	▌ ✓ Bill Haslam (Republican) 65.0%; ▌Mike McWherter (Democratic) 33.1%
Texas	Rick Perry	Republican	2000 (Note: Perry took office after his predecessor (George W. Bush) resigned. He was subsequently elected in the 2002 Texas gubernatorial election.)	Incumbent re-elected.	▌ ✓ Rick Perry (Republican) 55.0%; ▌Bill White (Democratic) 42.3%; ▌Kathie Glass (Libertarian) 2.2%
Utah (special)	Gary Herbert	Republican	2009 (Note: Herbert took office after his predecessor (Jon Huntsman Jr.) resigned.)	Incumbent elected to full term.	▌ ✓ Gary Herbert (Republican) 64.1%; ▌Peter Corroon (Democratic) 31.9%; ▌Farley Anderson (Independent) 2.0%; ▌Andrew McCullough (Libertarian) 2.0%
Vermont	Jim Douglas	Republican	2002	Incumbent retired. New governor elected. Democratic gain.	▌ ✓ Peter Shumlin (Democratic) 49.4%; ▌Brian Dubie (Republican) 47.7%
Wisconsin	Jim Doyle	Democratic	2002	Incumbent retired. New governor elected. Republican gain.	▌ ✓ Scott Walker (Republican) 52.3%; ▌Tom Barrett (Democratic) 46.5%
Wyoming	Dave Freudenthal	Democratic	2002	Incumbent term-limited. New governor elected. Republican gain.	▌ ✓ Matt Mead (Republican) 65.7%; ▌Leslie Petersen (Democratic) 22.9%; ▌Taylor Haynes (Independent) 7.3%; ▌Mike Wheeler (Libertarian) 2.9%

=== Territories and federal district ===
Territory	Incumbent	Party	First elected	Result	Candidates
District of Columbia	Adrian Fenty	Democratic	2006	Incumbent lost renomination. New mayor elected. Democratic hold.	▌ ✓ Vincent C. Gray (Democratic) 74.2%; ▌Write-ins 22.4%; ▌Carlos Allen (Independent) 1.7%; ▌Faith Dane (Statehood Green) 1.1%
Guam	Felix Camacho	Republican	2002	Incumbent term-limited. New governor elected. Republican hold.	▌ ✓ Eddie Calvo (Republican) 50.6%; ▌Carl Gutierrez (Democratic) 49.4%
U.S. Virgin Islands	John de Jongh	Democratic	2006	Incumbent re-elected.	▌ ✓ John de Jongh (Democratic) 56.3%; ▌Kenneth Mapp (Independent) 43.6%

== Closest races ==
States where the margin of victory was under 1%:

1. Minnesota, 0.4%
2. Connecticut, 0.7%
3. Illinois, 0.9%

States where the margin of victory was under 5%:

1. Oregon, 1.1%
2. Florida, 1.2%
3. Guam, 1.2%
4. Maine, 1.8%
5. Vermont, 1.8%
6. Ohio, 2.0%
7. Rhode Island, 2.5%
8. South Carolina, 4.3%

States where the margin of victory was under 10%:

1. Wisconsin, 5.7%
2. Massachusetts, 6.3%
3. New Mexico, 7.2%
4. New Hampshire, 7.5%
5. Pennsylvania, 9.0%
6. Iowa, 9.7%
7. Georgia, 9.8%

Red denotes states won by Republicans. Blue denotes states won by Democrats. Grey denotes states won by Independents.

== Alabama ==
Alabama gubernatorial election
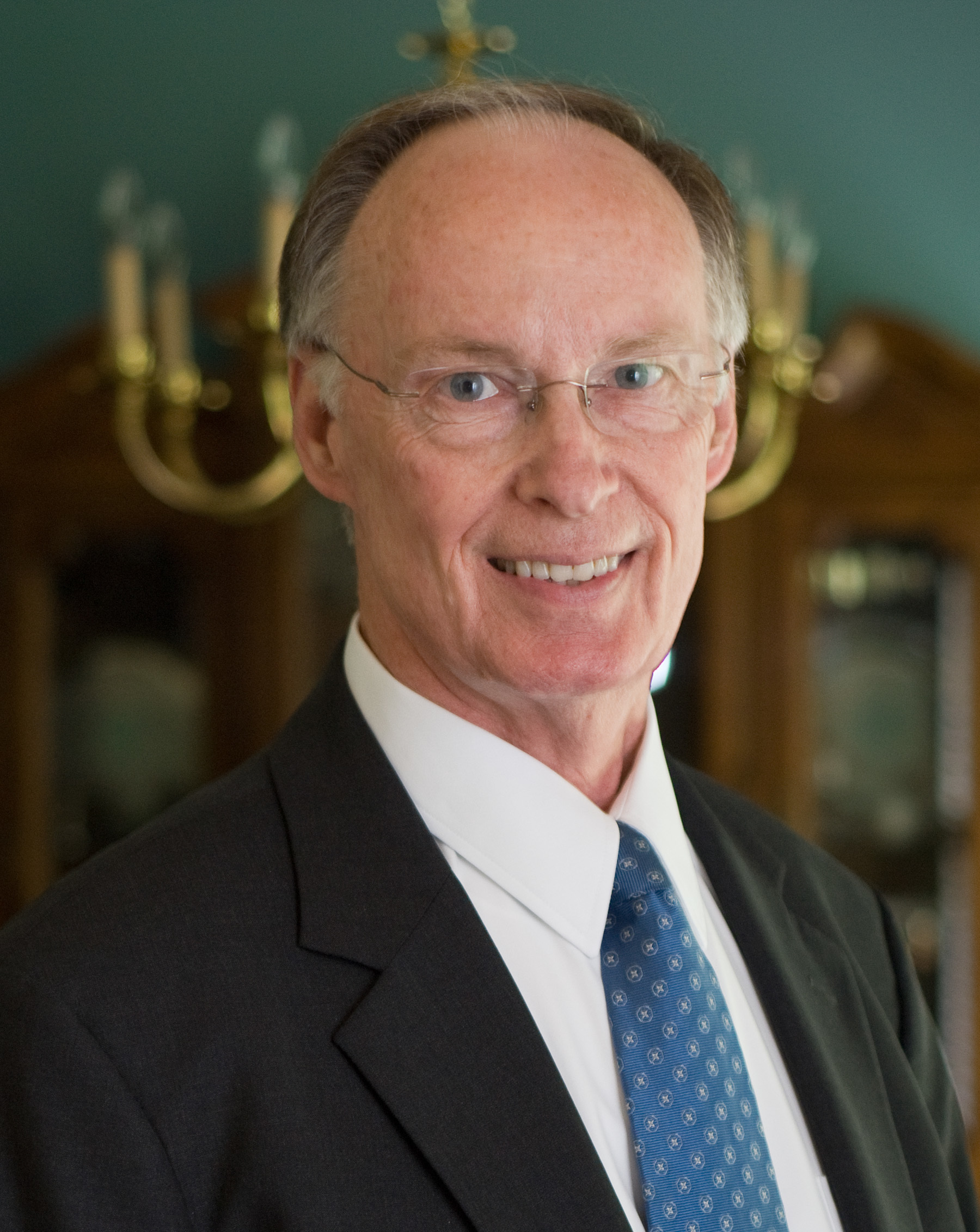

Nominee	Robert J. Bentley	Ron Sparks
Party	Republican	Democratic
Popular vote	860,472	625,710
Percentage	57.6%	41.9%
- County results
Governor before election
Bob Riley
Republican
Elected Governor
Robert J. Bentley
Republican

Governor Bob Riley was term-limited in 2010.

Businessman and 2002 Republican gubernatorial primary candidate Timothy James, State Representative Robert Bentley, Chancellor Bradley Byrne, and former state Supreme Court chief justice Roy Moore, were all major contenders for the Republican nomination. In the June 1 primary, Byrne finished in first place with 28.9%, followed by Robert J. Bentley who won 25.2% of the vote. Due to state law, the two were forced into a July runoff election, in which Bentley defeated Byrne by a margin of 56.1 to 43.9% to win the Republican nomination.

For the Democratic side, State Agriculture Commissioner Ron Sparks easily defeated Congressman Artur Davis of Alabama's 7th congressional district in the June 1 primary.

In the general election, Bentley defeated Sparks.

2010 Alabama gubernatorial election
Party	Candidate	Votes	%	±%
Republican	Robert J. Bentley (incumbent)	860,472	57.58%	+0.13%
Democratic	Ron Sparks	625,710	41.87%	+0.30%
Write-in		8,091	0.54%	-0.44%
Total votes		1,494,273	100.00%	N/A
Republican hold				

== Alaska ==
Alaska gubernatorial election
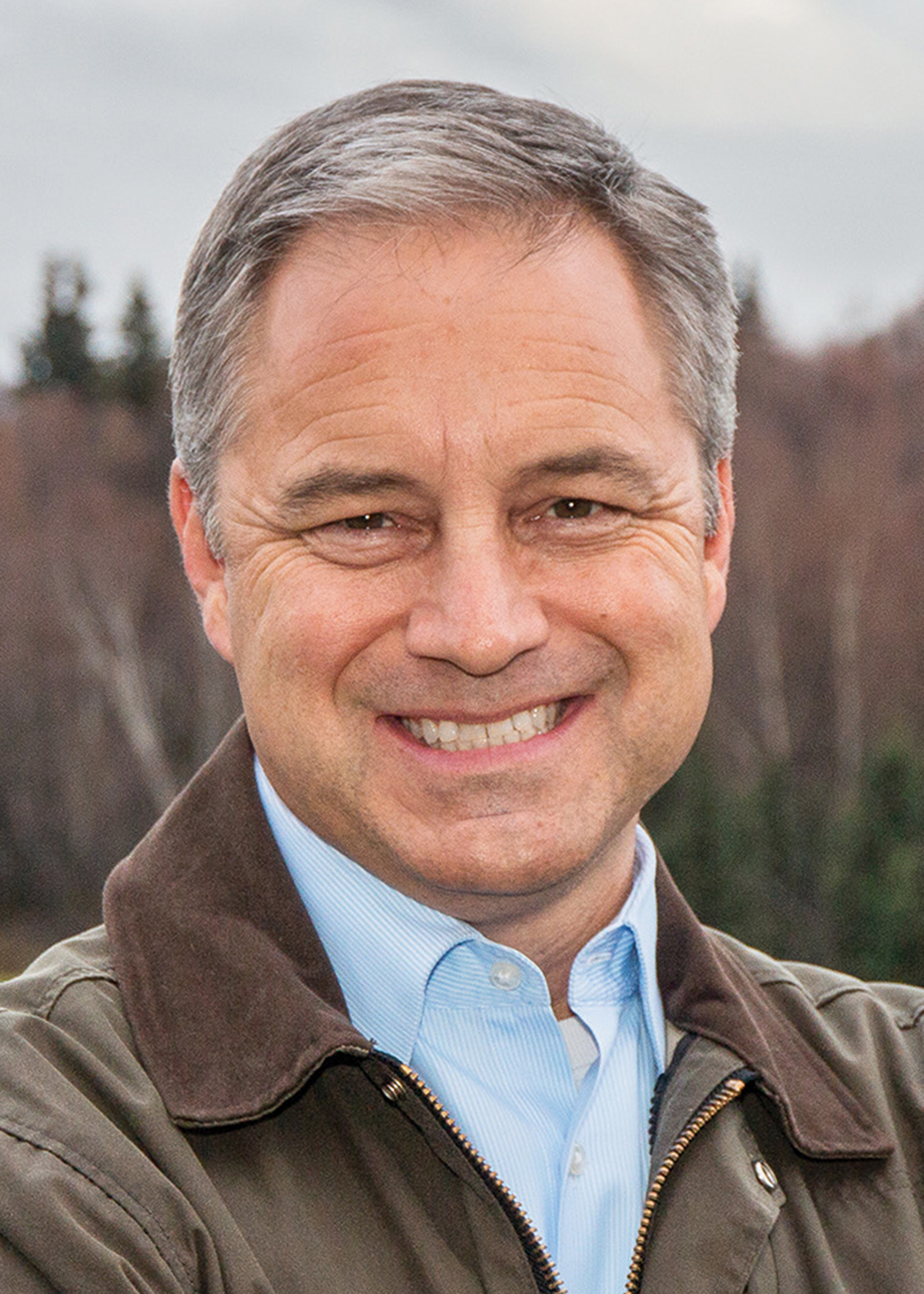

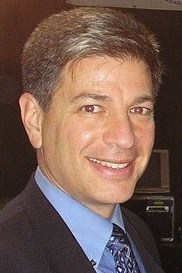
Nominee	Sean Parnell	Ethan Berkowitz
Party	Republican	Democratic
Running mate	Mead Treadwell	Diane E. Benson
Popular vote	151,318	96,519
Percentage	59.1%	37.7%
- Borough and census area results
Governor before election
Sean Parnell
Republican
Elected Governor
Sean Parnell
Republican

Governor Sarah Palin was elected in 2006 with 48% of the vote and was eligible to seek reelection in 2010. On July 3, 2009, Palin announced that she would not run for reelection, and resigned on July 26, 2009. On July 26, Lt. Gov. Sean Parnell became the 12th Governor of Alaska. Parnell officially announced that he would be running for a first full-term in 2010. In August 2010 he won the Republican nomination for governor.

Parnell faced former State Representative and 2008 congressional nominee Ethan Berkowitz, and won the Democratic nomination against State Senator Hollis French, in the November election. Parnell won a first full-term.

Alaska election
Party	Candidate	Votes	%
Republican	Sean Parnell (incumbent)	151,318	59.06
Democratic	Ethan Berkowitz	96,519	37.67
Independence	Don Wright	4,775	1.86
Libertarian	Billy Toien	2,682	1.05
Write-in		898	0.35
Total votes		256,192	100.00
Republican hold			

== Arizona ==
Arizona gubernatorial election
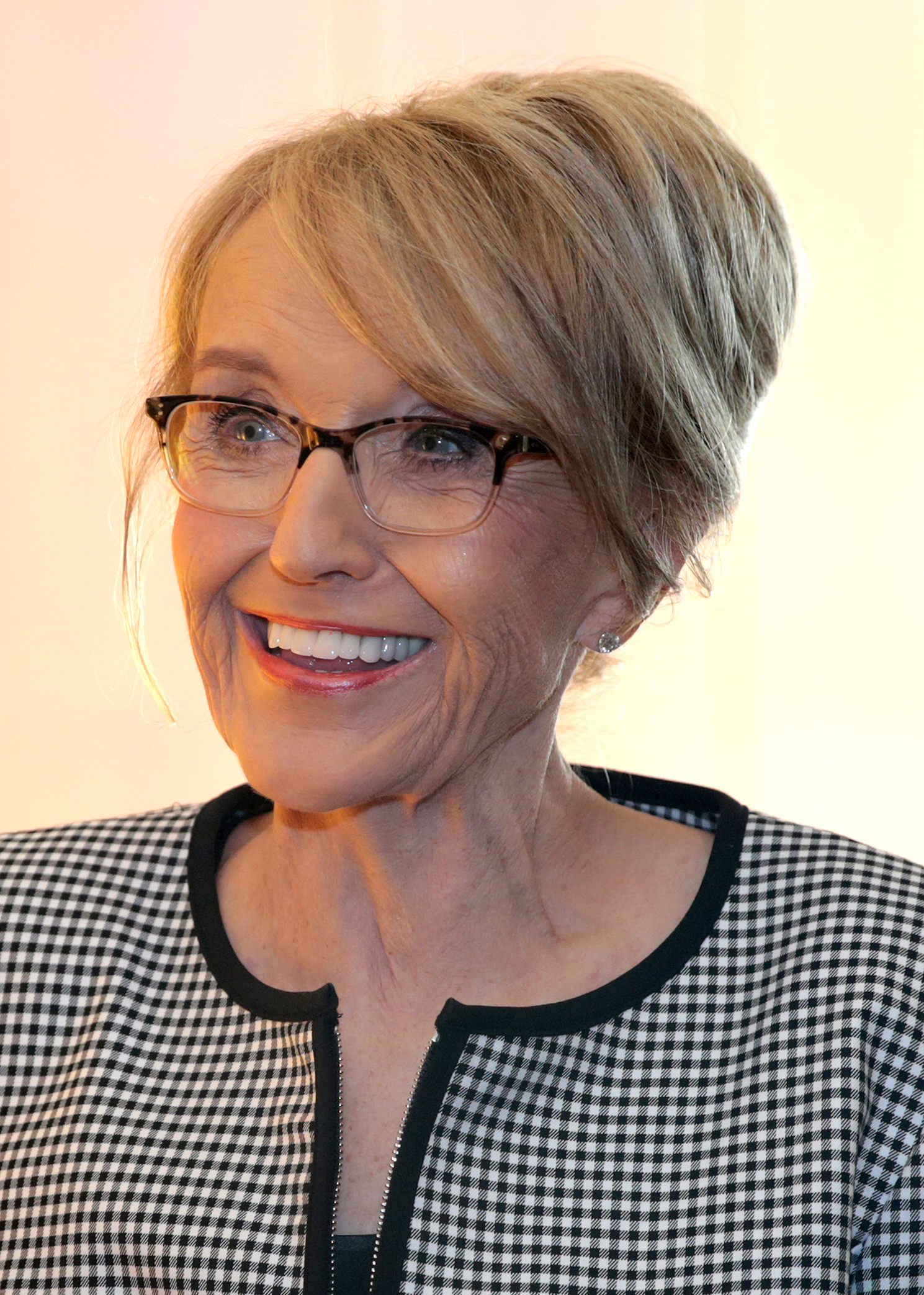

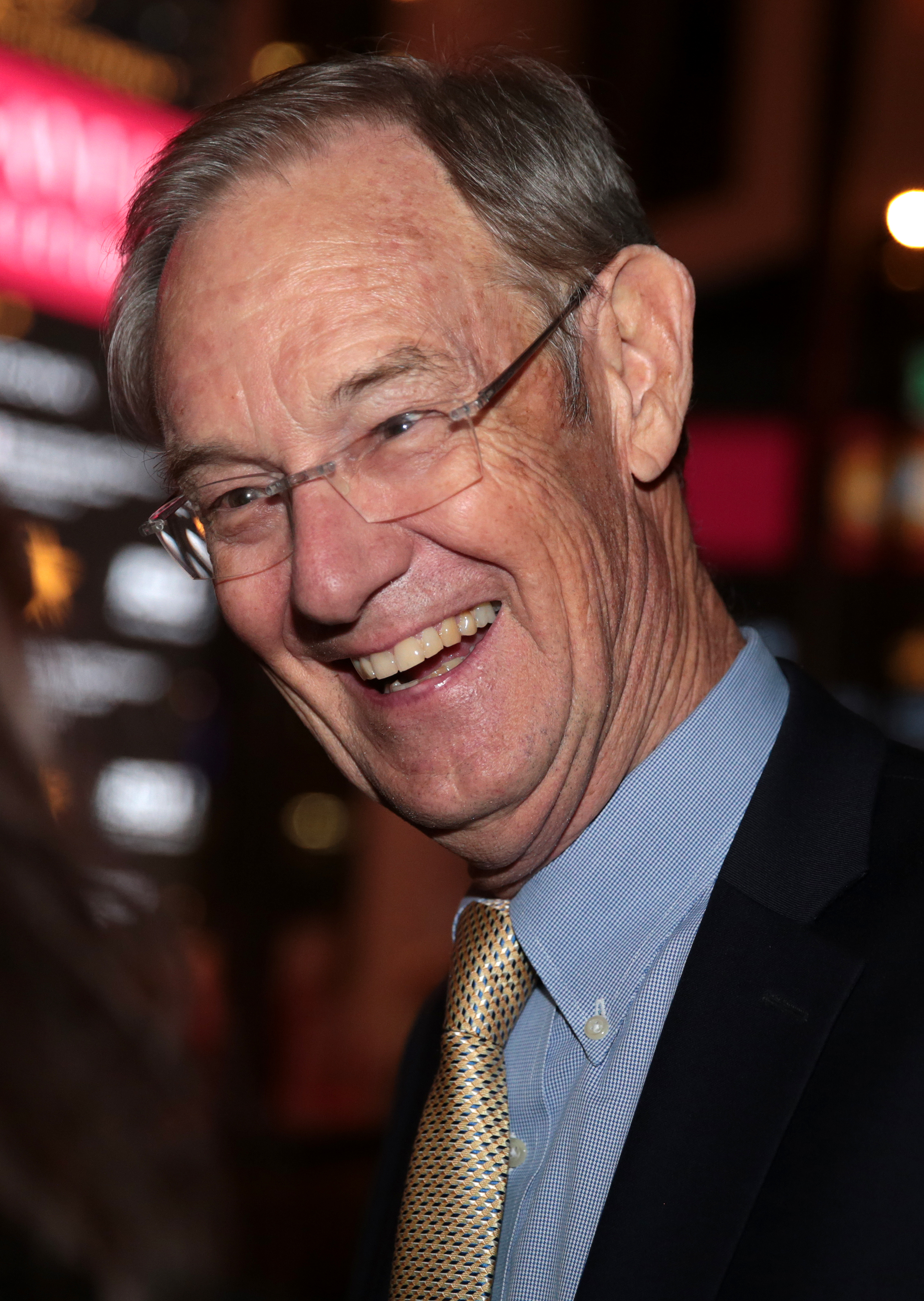
Nominee	Jan Brewer	Terry Goddard
Party	Republican	Democratic
Popular vote	938,934	733,935
Percentage	54.3%	42.4%
- County results
Governor before election
Jan Brewer
Republican
Elected Governor
Jan Brewer
Republican

Democratic Governor Janet Napolitano was nominated by President Barack Obama and confirmed by the United States Senate as Secretary of Homeland Security in early 2009. Republican Secretary of State Jan Brewer was first in the state's gubernatorial line of succession and became governor upon Napolitano's subsequent resignation. Brewer was seeking a full term in 2010. She would face a primary challenge from former state Senator Karen Johnson, Tucson attorney John Munger, and State Treasurer Dean Martin.

The announced Democratic candidate was Arizona Attorney General Terry Goddard. A potential Democratic candidate could have been Phoenix mayor Phil Gordon.

Jan Brewer won the Republican primary election, and Terry Goddard won the Democratic primary election. Brewer defeated Goddard in the election.

Arizona election
Party	Candidate	Votes	%
Republican	Jan Brewer (incumbent)	938,934	54.33
Democratic	Terry Goddard	733,935	42.43
Libertarian	Barry Hess	38,722	2.24
Green	Larry Gist	16,128	0.93
Write-in		362	0.02
Total votes		1,728,081	100.00
Republican hold			

== Arkansas ==
Arkansas gubernatorial election
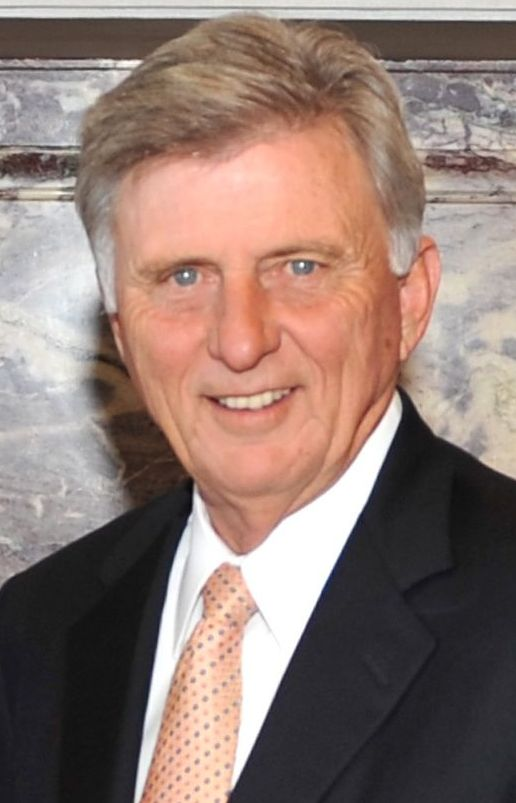

Nominee	Mike Beebe	Jim Keet
Party	Democratic	Republican
Popular vote	503,336	262,784
Percentage	64.4%	33.6%
- County results
Governor before election
Mike Beebe
Democratic
Elected Governor
Mike Beebe
Democratic

Governor Mike Beebe sought a second term in 2010. He was elected with 55% of the vote in 2006. In March 2009 Beebe's approval rating was 68%, according to Public Policy Polling. Jim Keet, a former State Senator, was the Republican nominee.

Beebe defeated Keet in a landslide election.

Arkansas election
Party	Candidate	Votes	%
Democratic	Mike Beebe (incumbent)	503,336	64.42
Republican	Jim Keet	262,784	33.63
Green	Jim Lendall	14,513	1.86
Write-in		700	0.09
Total votes		781,333	100.00
Democratic hold			

== California ==
California gubernatorial election
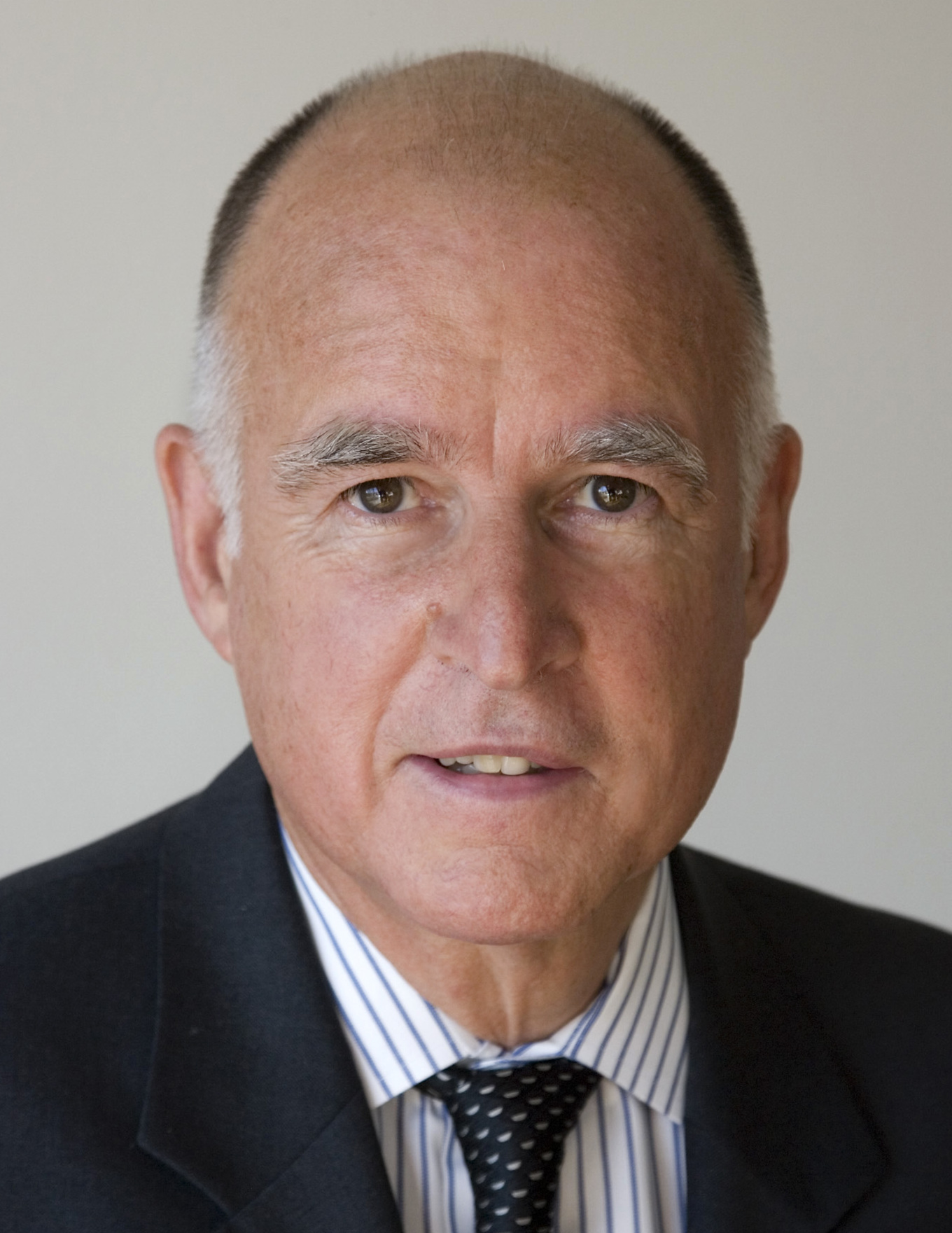

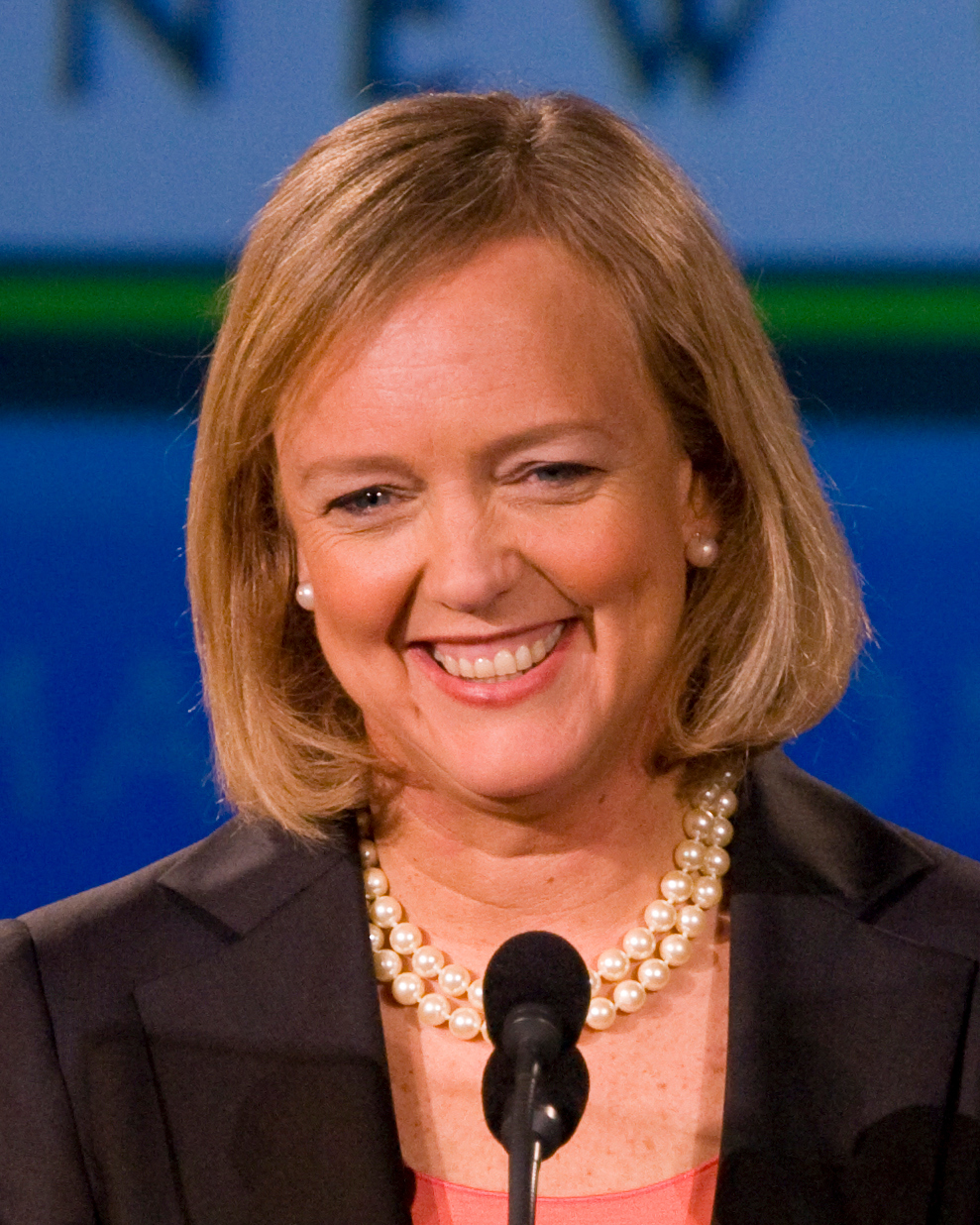
Nominee	Jerry Brown	Meg Whitman
Party	Democratic	Republican
Popular vote	5,428,149	4,127,391
Percentage	53.8%	40.9%
- County results
Governor before election
Arnold Schwarzenegger
Republican
Elected Governor
Jerry Brown
Democratic

Governor Arnold Schwarzenegger was term-limited in 2010.

Former eBay CEO Meg Whitman was the Republican nominee for the Gubernatorial election, defeating state Insurance Commissioner Steve Poizner in the California Republican Party primary.

Former Governor and current Attorney General Jerry Brown was the Democratic nominee.

Brown defeated Whitman in the general election.

California election
Party	Candidate	Votes	%
Democratic	Jerry Brown	5,428,149	53.77
Republican	Meg Whitman	4,127,391	40.88
American Independent	Chelene Nightingale	166,312	1.65
Libertarian	Dale Ogden	150,895	1.49
Green	Laura Wells	129,224	1.28
Peace and Freedom	Carlos Alvarez	92,851	0.92
Write-in		363	0.00
Total votes		10,095,185	100.00
Democratic gain from Republican			

== Colorado ==
Colorado gubernatorial election
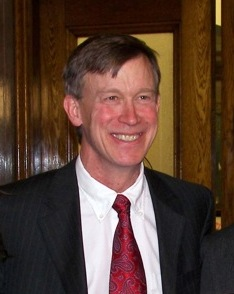

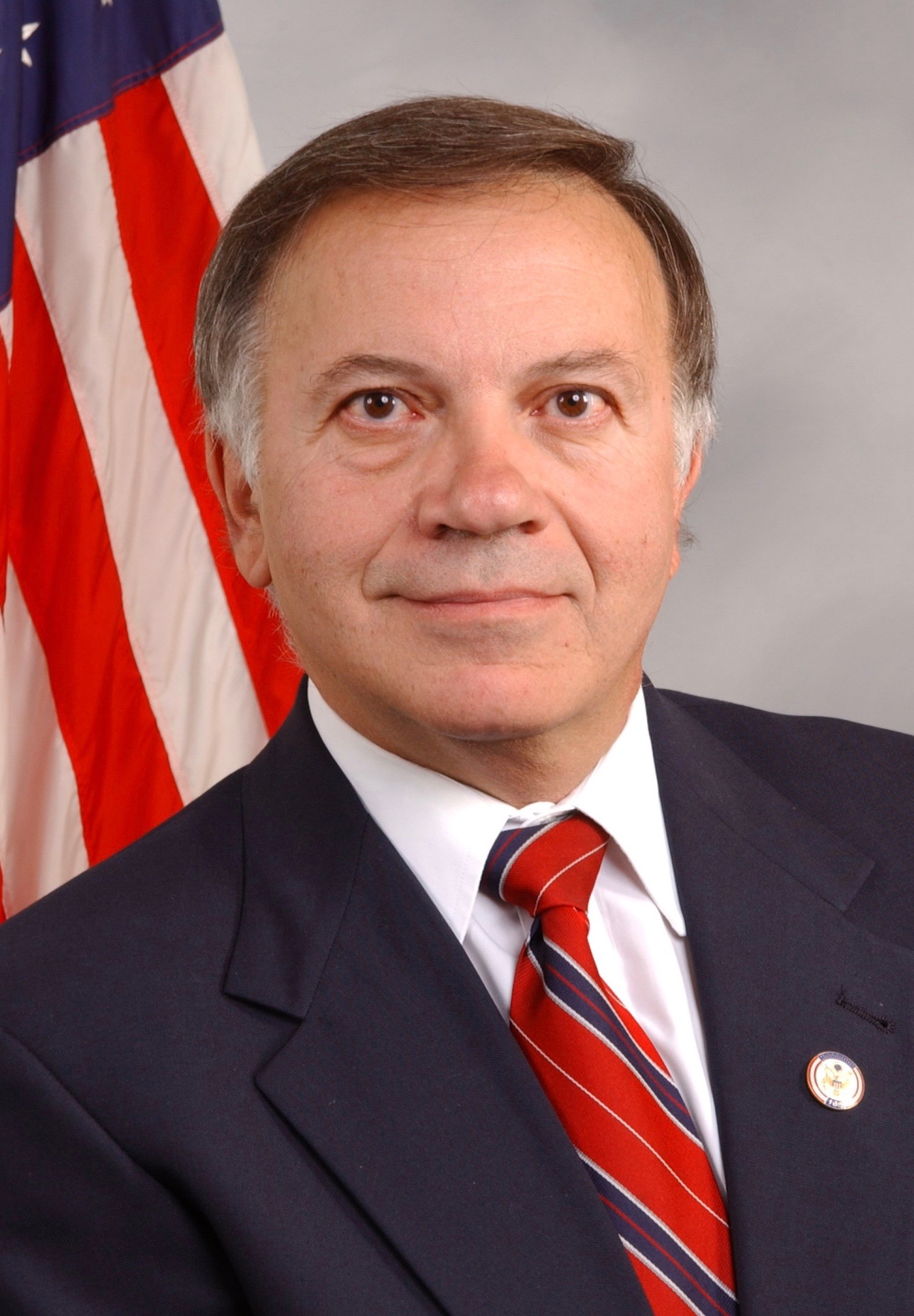

Nominee	John Hickenlooper	Tom Tancredo	Dan Maes
Party	Democratic	Constitution	Republican
Running mate	Joe Garcia	Pat Miller	Tambor Williams
Popular vote	915,436	652,376	199,792
Percentage	51.1%	36.4%	11.1%
- County results
Governor before election
Bill Ritter
Democratic
Elected Governor
John Hickenlooper
Democratic

Governor Bill Ritter declined to run for re-election. He had been elected with 57% of the vote in 2006. Following Ritter's announcement, Denver Mayor John Hickenlooper announced his candidacy. Hickenlooper faced no opposition in the Democratic primary.

Businessman Dan Maes became the Republican nominee by winning the August 10 primary election.

Former Congressman Tom Tancredo ran under the banner of the American Constitution Party.

In the general, Hickenlooper decisively defeated Tancredo and Maes. Maes won only 11.6% of the vote, nearly reducing the Republican Party to minor-party status in Colorado.

Colorado election
Party	Candidate	Votes	%
Democratic	John Hickenlooper	915,436	51.05
Constitution	Tom Tancredo	652,376	36.38
Republican	Dan Maes	199,792	11.14
Libertarian	Jaimes Brown	13,365	0.74
Independent	Jason R. Clark	8,601	0.48
Independent	Paul Fiorino	3,492	0.19
Write-in		86	0.00
Total votes		1,793,148	100.00
Democratic hold			

== Connecticut ==
Connecticut gubernatorial election
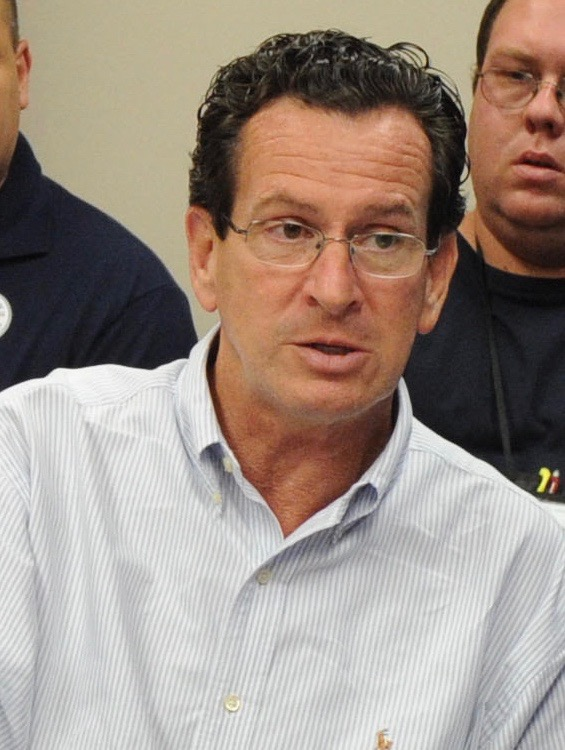

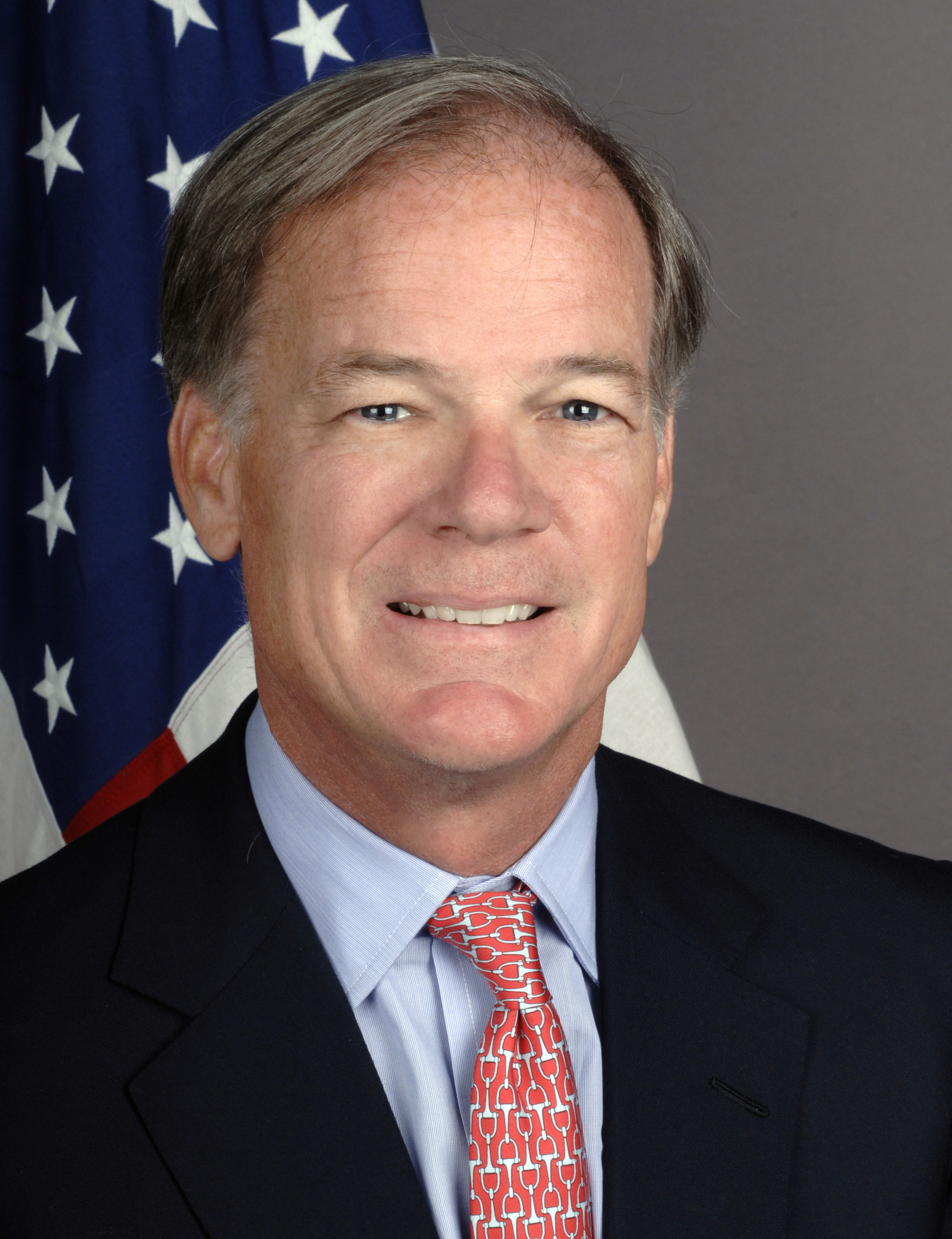
Nominee	Dannel Malloy	Thomas C. Foley
Party	Democratic	Republican
Running mate	Nancy Wyman	Mark Boughton
Popular vote	567,278	560,874
Percentage	49.5%	49.0%
- County results
Governor before election
Jodi Rell
Republican
Elected Governor
Dannel Malloy
Democratic

On November 9, 2009, incumbent Governor Jodi Rell announced she would not seek a second full term in 2010. She was elected to a full term in 2006 with 63% of the vote.

The Republican nomination was won by former United States Ambassador to Ireland Thomas C. Foley, who defeated Lt. Governor Michael Fedele.

The Democratic nominee was Stamford Mayor Dan Malloy, who defeated businessman and 2006 Democratic Senatorial nominee Ned Lamont.

Connecticut election
Party	Candidate	Votes	%
Democratic	Dannel Malloy	567,278	49.51
Republican	Thomas C. Foley	560,874	48.95
Independent	Thomas E. Marsh	17,629	1.54
Write-in		18	0.00
Total votes		1,145,799	100.00
Democratic gain from Republican			

== Florida ==
Florida gubernatorial election
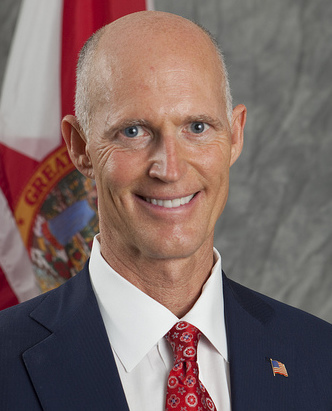

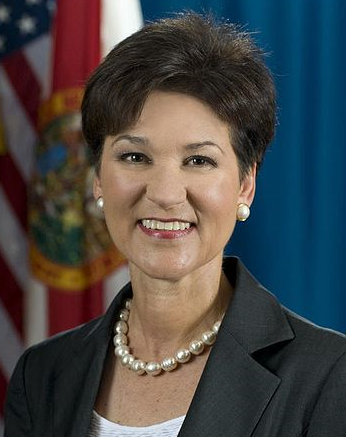
Nominee	Rick Scott	Alex Sink
Party	Republican	Democratic
Running mate	Jennifer Carroll	Rod Smith
Popular vote	2,619,335	2,557,785
Percentage	48.9%	47.7%
- County results
Governor before election
Charlie Crist
Independent
Elected Governor
Rick Scott
Republican

First-term Governor Charlie Crist was eligible to seek re-election, but decided instead to run for the United States Senate seat held by George LeMieux. After a tough primary challenge the Republican Party chose businessman Rick Scott over Florida Attorney General Bill McCollum. The Democratic Party nominated Florida CFO Alex Sink.

Crist was elected as a Republican, but left the party and became an independent during his Senate campaign.

Scott defeated Sink in the election.

Florida election
Party	Candidate	Votes	%
Republican	Rick Scott	2,619,335	48.87
Democratic	Alex Sink	2,557,785	47.72
Independence	Peter Allen	123,831	2.31
Independent	C. C. Reed	18,842	0.35
Independent	Michael E. Arth	18,644	0.35
Independent	Daniel Imperato	13,690	0.26
Independent	Farid Khavari	7,487	0.14
Write-in		121	0.00
Total votes		5,359,735	100.00
Republican gain from Independent			

== Georgia ==
Georgia gubernatorial election
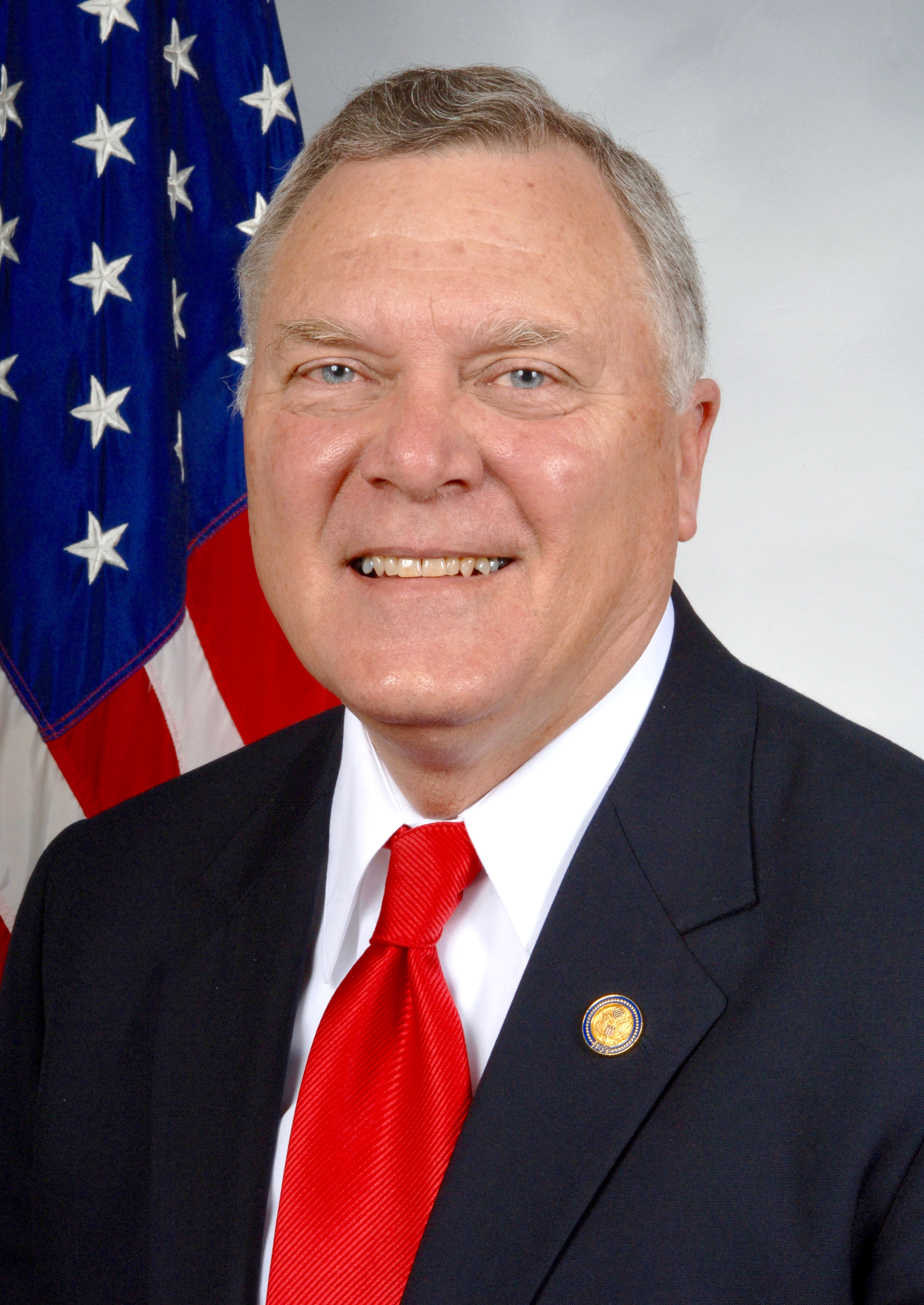

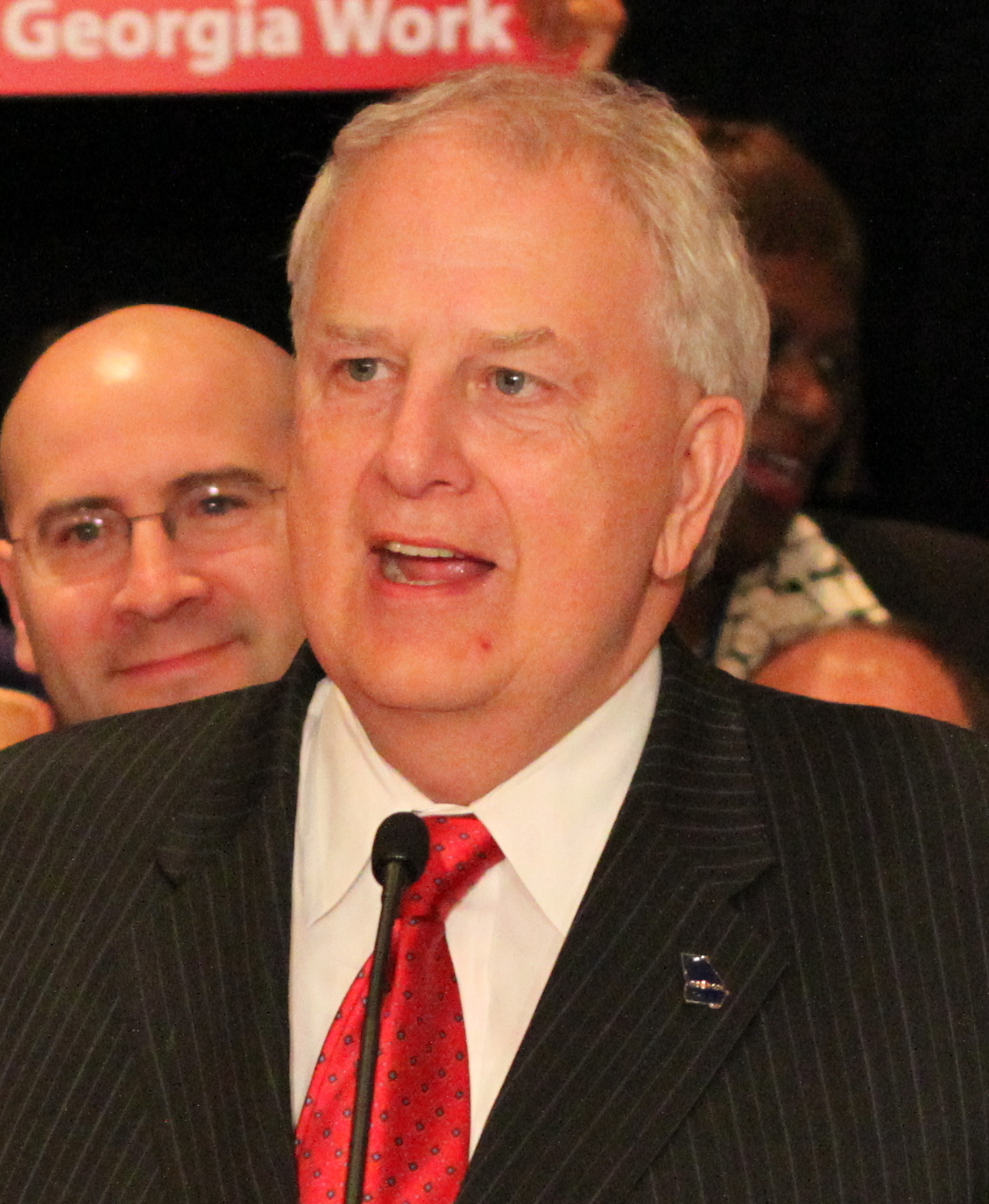
Nominee	Nathan Deal	Roy Barnes
Party	Republican	Democratic
Popular vote	1,365,832	1,107,011
Percentage	53.0%	43.0%
- County results
Governor before election
Sonny Perdue
Republican
Elected Governor
Nathan Deal
Republican

Governor Sonny Perdue was term-limited in 2010.

On the Republican side, former Secretary of State Karen Handel, and former Congressman Nathan Deal faced each other in a runoff, defeating other candidates including state Insurance Commissioner John Oxendine in the July 20 primary. Lieutenant Governor Casey Cagle had established an exploratory committee in September 2008, but dropped out of the race on April 15, 2009, because of health problems.

On the Democratic side, former Governor Roy Barnes, whom Perdue unseated in 2002, won the July 20 primary against former state Secretary of State David Poythress, state Attorney General Thurbert Baker, and state House Minority Leader DuBose Porter.

The Libertarian Party fielded as its candidate John Monds, who served as president of the Grady County NAACP and was the first Libertarian candidate in U.S. history to receive more than one million votes, when he ran for the Georgia Public Service Commission in 2008.

Georgia election
Party	Candidate	Votes	%
Republican	Nathan Deal	1,365,832	53.02
Democratic	Roy Barnes	1,107,011	42.97
Libertarian	John Monds	103,194	4.01
Write-in		124	0.00
Total votes		2,576,161	100.00
Republican hold			

== Hawaii ==
Hawaii gubernatorial election
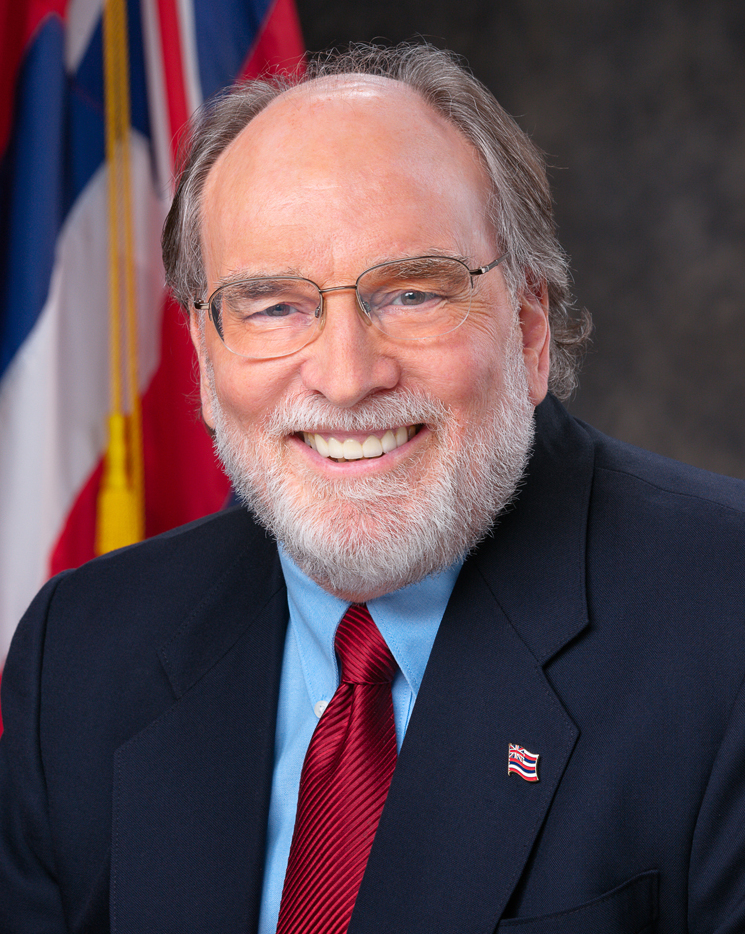

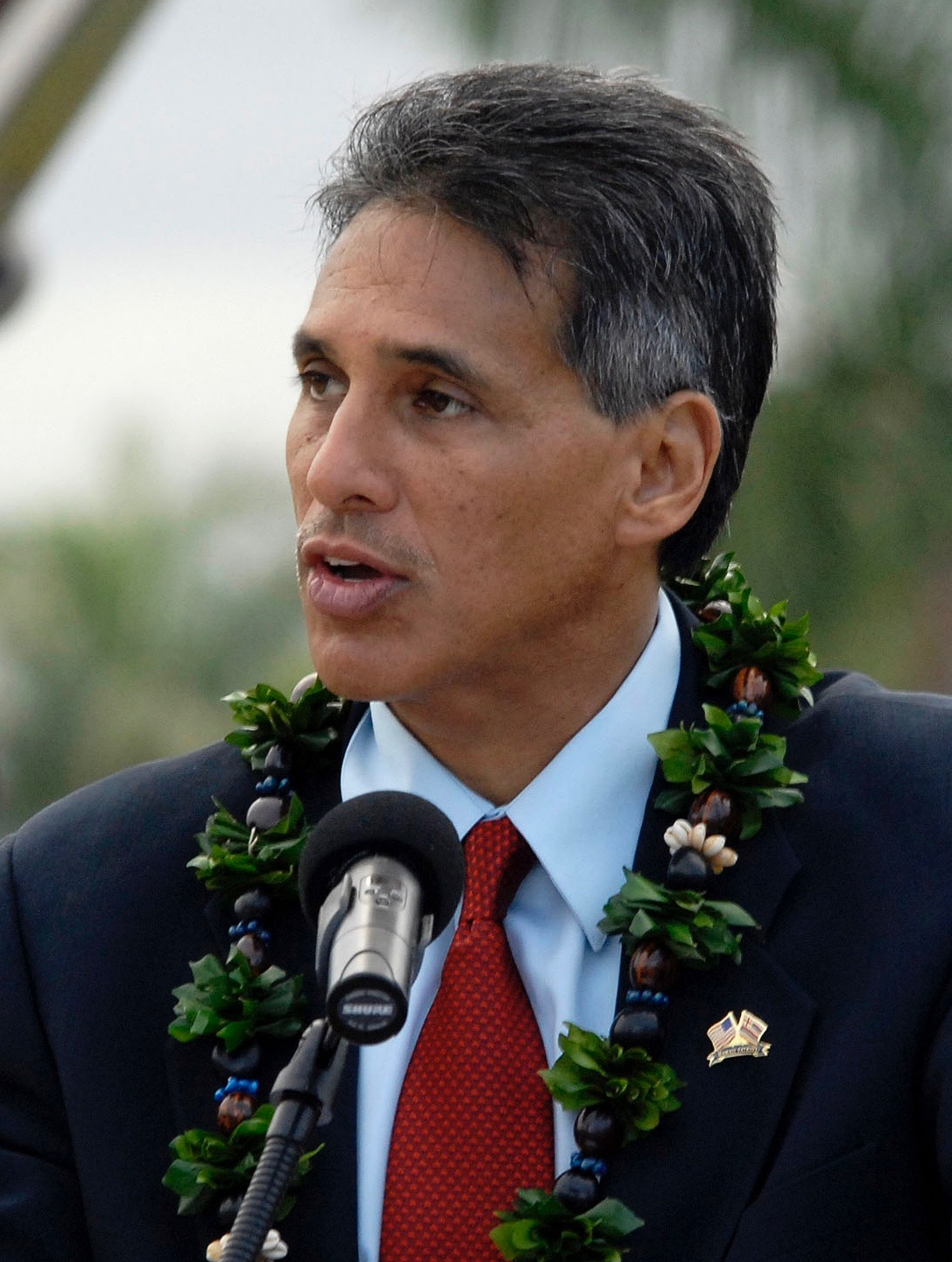
Nominee	Neil Abercrombie	Duke Aiona
Party	Democratic	Republican
Running mate	Brian Schatz	Lynn Finnegan
Popular vote	222,724	157,311
Percentage	57.8%	40.8%
- County results
Governor before election
Linda Lingle
Republican
Elected Governor
Neil Abercrombie
Democratic

Governor Linda Lingle was term-limited in 2010.

Republican Lieutenant Governor Duke Aiona ran.

Democratic Congressman Neil Abercrombie announced that he would run. Another possible Democratic candidate was Honolulu mayor Mufi Hannemann.

Hawaii election
Party	Candidate	Votes	%
Democratic	Neil Abercrombie	222,724	58.61
Republican	Duke Aiona	157,311	41.39
Free Energy	Daniel Cunningham	1,265	0.33
Nonpartisan	Tom Pollard	1,263	0.33
Total votes		380,035	100.00
Democratic gain from Republican			

== Idaho ==
Idaho gubernatorial election
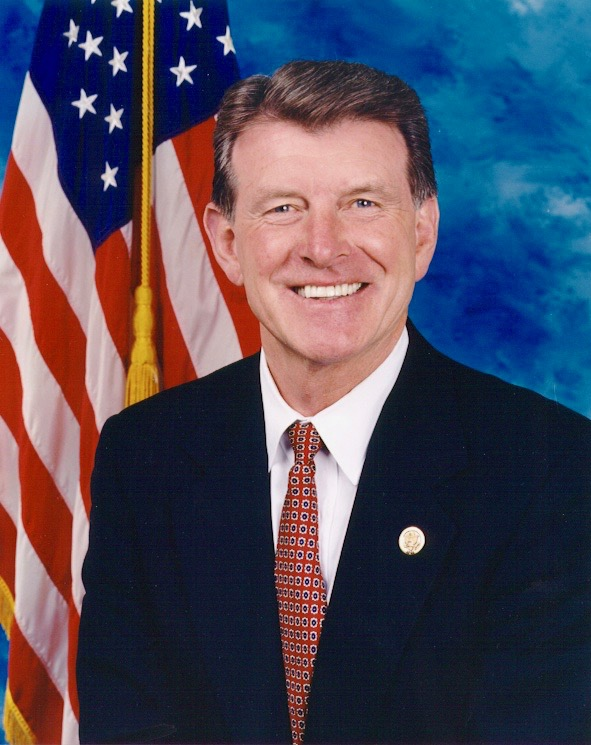

Nominee	Butch Otter	Keith G. Allred	Jana Kemp
Party	Republican	Democratic	Independent
Popular vote	267,483	148,680	26,655
Percentage	59.1%	32.9%	5.9%
- County results
Governor before election
Butch Otter
Republican
Elected Governor
Butch Otter
Republican

Governor Butch Otter sought a second term in 2010. A former state legislator, lieutenant governor and Congressman, Otter was elected in 2006 with 52 percent of the vote but struggled to implement many of his policies despite an overwhelmingly Republican Idaho Legislature. In May 2010 Otter brushed aside primary challenges from Ada County commissioner Sharon Ullman and conservative activist Rex Rammell, who ran for U.S. Senate in 2008 as an independent.

Democratic primary candidates included activist and mediator Keith G. Allred, and Franklin County laborer Lon Chaney, who unsuccessfully contested the Democratic nomination in 2006. Allred easily defeated Chaney for the Democratic nomination.

Former Republican state representative Jana Kemp was an announced independent candidate.

Otter won re-election.

Idaho election
Party	Candidate	Votes	%
Republican	Butch Otter	267,483	59.11
Democratic	Keith G. Allred	148,680	32.85
Independent	Jana M. Kemp	26,655	5.89
Libertarian	Ted Dunlap	5,867	1.30
Independent	Pro-Life	3,850	0.85
Total votes		452,535	100.00
Republican hold			

== Illinois ==
Illinois gubernatorial election
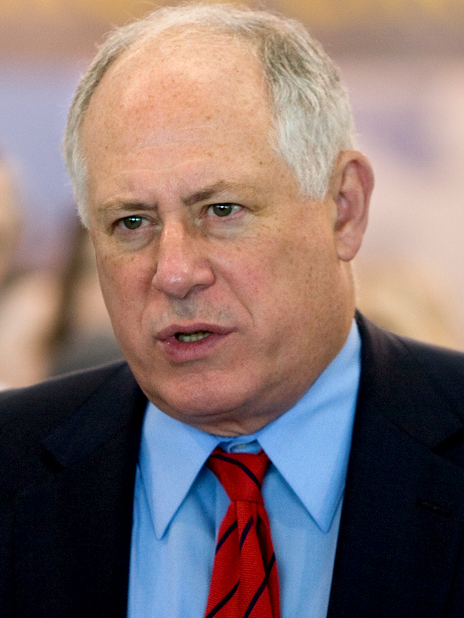

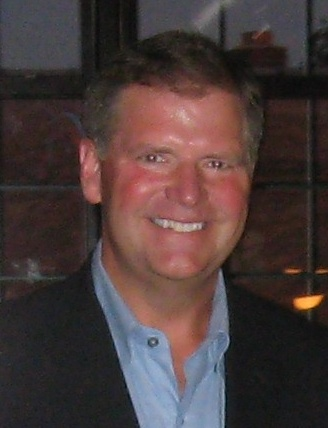
Nominee	Pat Quinn	Bill Brady
Party	Democratic	Republican
Running mate	Sheila Simon	Jason Plummer
Popular vote	1,745,219	1,713,385
Percentage	46.8%	45.9%
- County results
Governor before election
Pat Quinn
Democratic
Elected Governor
Pat Quinn
Democratic

Governor Pat Quinn sought a full term in 2010. On January 29, 2009, by succession, Quinn became governor when Governor Rod Blagojevich was impeached, convicted and removed from office by the Illinois State Senate. Quinn was challenged for the Democratic nomination by State Comptroller Dan Hynes. On February 2, Quinn defeated Hynes by a narrow margin in a 50–50 split in the statewide primary. Despite trailing by only a few thousand votes, Hynes declined a recount and conceded the election to Quinn.

The six-man Republican primary wasn't decided until March 5, 2010, when the final tally was announced. Only 193 votes (two-thousandths of one-percent) separated State Senator Bill Brady and former gubernatorial Chief of Staff Kirk Dillard, out of more than 750,000 votes. Dillard said he would not challenge the results for financial and political reasons. Political experts ABC talked with said, "unless Dillard had evidence of specific miscounting or fraud, it's not worth asking for a recount. And it's certainly better for party unity."

Quinn defeated Brady in the election.

Illinois election
Party	Candidate	Votes	%
Democratic	Pat Quinn (incumbent)	1,745,219	46.79
Republican	Bill Brady	1,713,385	45.94
Independent	Scott Lee Cohen	135,705	3.64
Green	Rich Whitney	100,756	2.70
Libertarian	Lex Green	34,681	0.93
Total votes		3,729,746	100.00
Democratic hold			

== Iowa ==
Iowa gubernatorial election
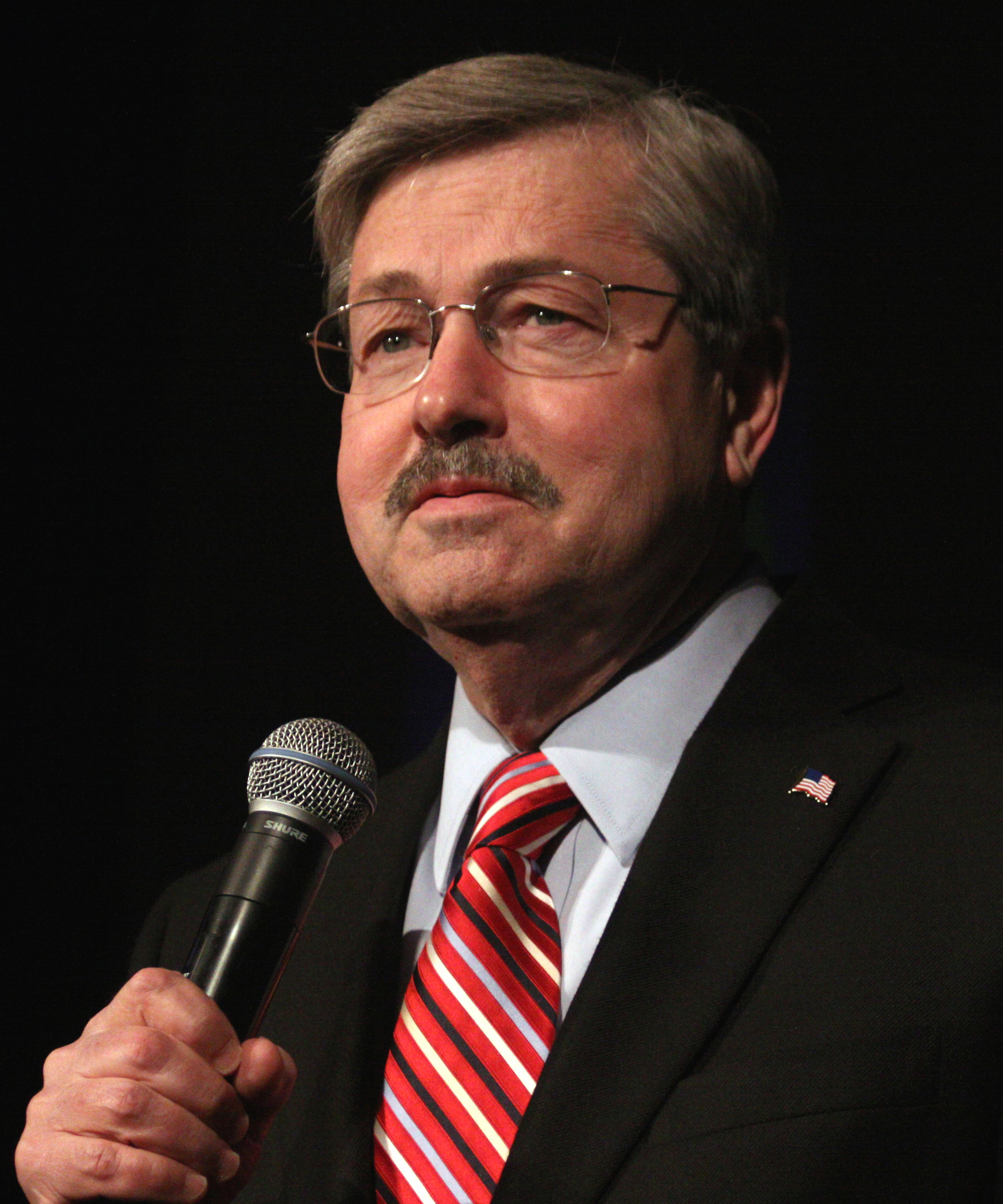

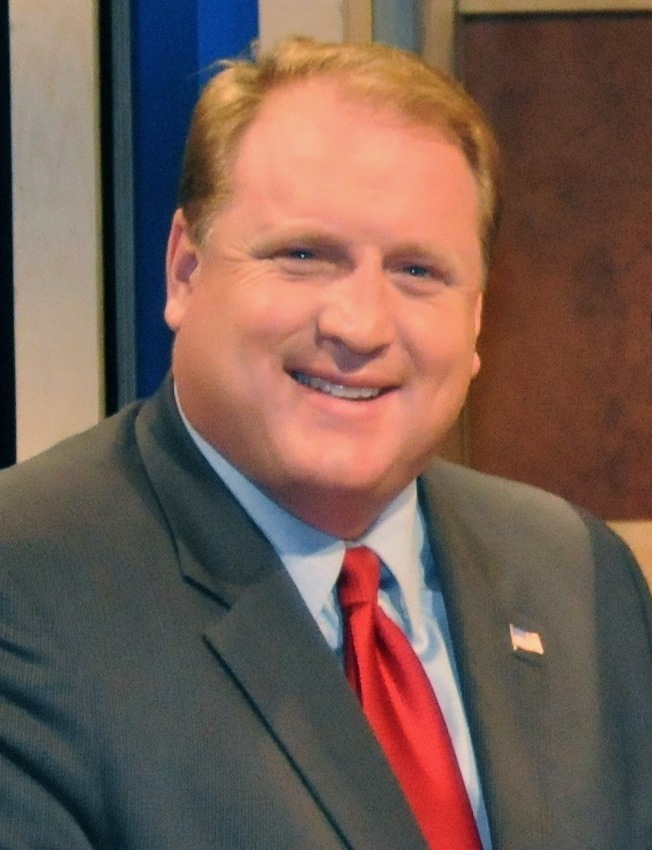
Nominee	Terry Branstad	Chet Culver
Party	Republican	Democratic
Running mate	Kim Reynolds	Patty Judge
Popular vote	592,494	484,798
Percentage	52.8%	43.2%
- County results
Governor before election
Chet Culver
Democratic
Elected Governor
Terry Branstad
Republican

Governor Chet Culver sought a second term in 2010. He was elected with 54% of the vote in 2006.

Former Governor Terry Branstad, whose four terms in the governor's mansion made him the longest-serving governor in Iowa history, formed an exploratory committee for the race. Republican Congressman Steve King was the subject of some early speculation but announced that he would run for re-election to the House in August 2009. Businessman Bob Vander Plaats, who was the Republican nominee for lieutenant governor in 2006, ran and was considered an early front-runner in the Republican primary. Other Republicans seeking their party's nomination included State Representatives Christopher Rants and businessman Christian Fong. Branstad was the favorite for Republican nomination, and led incumbent Democratic Governor Chet Culver in aggregate polling.

Branstad defeated then-sitting Governor Culver in the election.

Iowa election
Party	Candidate	Votes	%
Republican	Terry Branstad	592,494	52.81
Democratic	Chet Culver (incumbent)	484,798	43.21
Iowa	Jonathan Narcisse	20,859	1.86
Libertarian	Eric Cooper	14,398	1.28
Independent	Gregory Hughes	3,884	0.35
Socialist Workers	David Rosenfeld	2,757	0.25
Write-in		2,823	0.25
Total votes		1,122,013	100.00
Republican gain from Democratic			

== Kansas ==
Kansas gubernatorial election
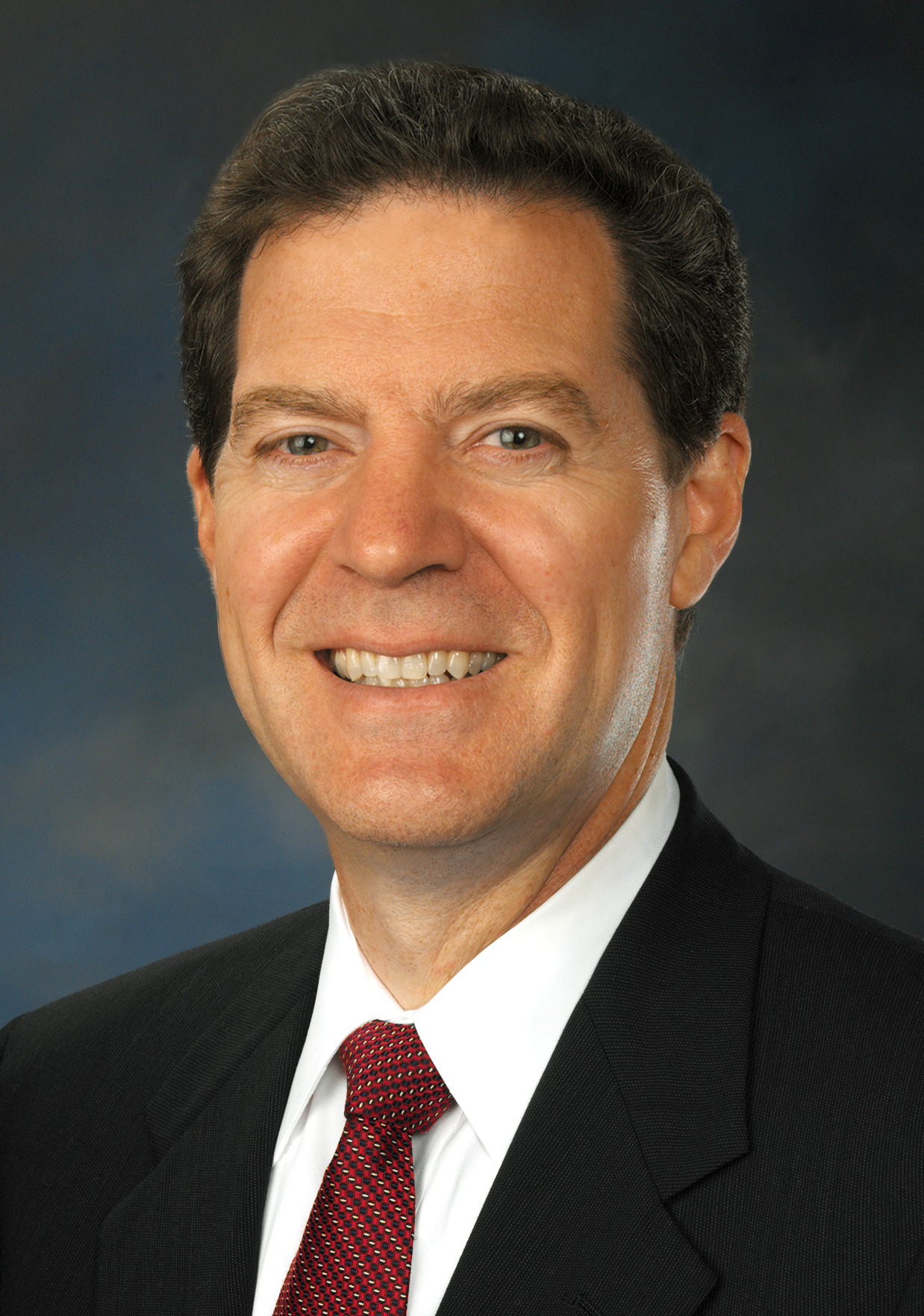

Nominee	Sam Brownback	Tom Holland
Party	Republican	Democratic
Running mate	Jeff Colyer	Kelly Kultala
Popular vote	530,760	270,166
Percentage	63.3%	32.2%
- County results
Governor before election
Mark Parkinson
Democratic
Elected Governor
Sam Brownback
Republican

Governor Kathleen Sebelius was term-limited in 2010. President Barack Obama nominated Sebelius as Secretary of Health and Human Services. Mark Parkinson, her replacement, did not seek a full term, and Republican Senator Sam Brownback defeated Democratic state Senator Tom Holland in the general election.

Kansas election
Party	Candidate	Votes	%
Republican	Sam Brownback	530,760	63.28
Democratic	Tom Holland	270,166	32.21
Libertarian	Andrew P. Gray	22,460	2.68
Reform	Kenneth W. Cannon	15,397	1.84
Write-in		7	0.00
Total votes		838,790	100.00
Republican gain from Democratic			

== Maine ==
Maine gubernatorial election
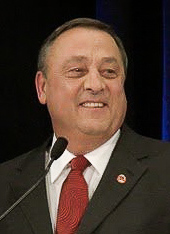

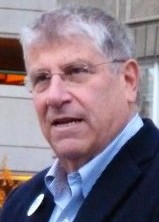
Nominee	Paul LePage	Eliot Cutler	Libby Mitchell
Party	Republican	Independent	Democratic
Popular vote	218,065	208,270	109,387
Percentage	37.6%	35.9%	18.8%
- County results
Governor before election
John Baldacci
Democratic
Elected Governor
Paul LePage
Republican

Governor John Baldacci was term-limited in 2010.

At the gubernatorial primary election on June 8, Maine Democrats chose State Senator Elizabeth "Libby" Mitchell as their nominee, while Waterville Mayor Paul LePage was chosen by the Republicans.

Three independent candidates were on the November 2 ballot: Eliot Cutler, lawyer, former staff member for U.S. Senator Edmund Muskie, and former adviser to President Jimmy Carter; Shawn Moody, business owner; and Kevin Scott, business owner.

The Maine Green Independent Party did not have a candidate on the ballot this year.

With 94% of precincts reporting on the day after the general election, the Bangor Daily News declared LePage the winner, carrying 38.1% of the votes. Cutler was in second place with 36.7% of the votes (less than 7,500 votes behind LePage), while Mitchell was a distant third with 19%. Moody and Scott had 5% and 1%, respectively.

Maine election
Party	Candidate	Votes	%
Republican	Paul LePage	218,065	37.56
Independent	Eliot Cutler	208,270	35.87
Democratic	Libby Mitchell	109,387	18.84
Independent	Shawn Moody	28,756	4.95
Independent	Kevin Scott	5,664	0.98
Total votes		580,538	100.00
Republican gain from Democratic			

== Maryland ==
Maryland gubernatorial election
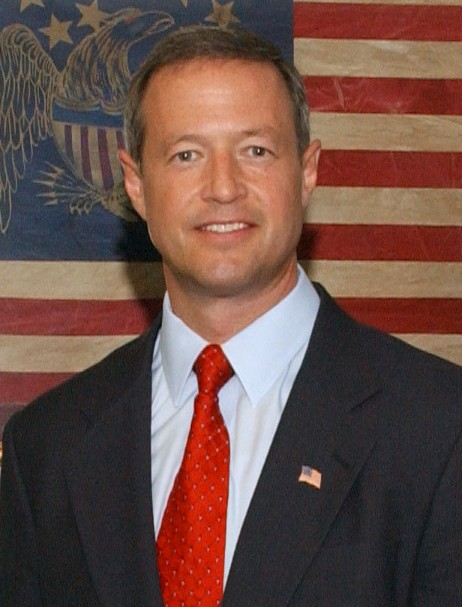

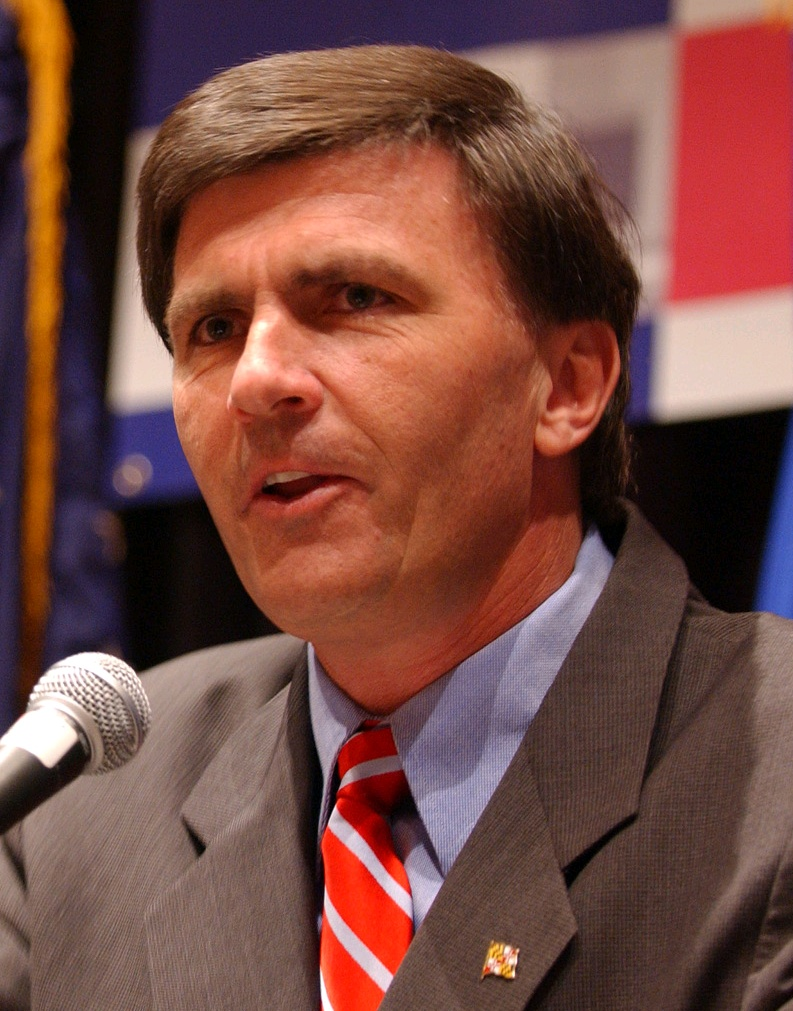
Nominee	Martin O'Malley	Bob Ehrlich
Party	Democratic	Republican
Running mate	Anthony Brown	Mary Kane
Popular vote	1,044,961	776,319
Percentage	56.2%	41.8%
- County results
Governor before election
Martin O'Malley
Democratic
Elected Governor
Martin O'Malley
Democratic

Governor Martin O'Malley sought a second term in 2010. He was elected with 53% of the vote in 2006.

Former Republican Governor Bob Ehrlich on March 30, 2010, announced that he would run. In the last election, in 2006, O'Malley narrowly defeated Ehrlich, who ran as an incumbent.

In the primary, Ehrlich faced business owner Brian Murphy.

O'Malley defeated former Governor Ehrlich in the election.

Maryland election
Party	Candidate	Votes	%
Democratic	Martin O'Malley (incumbent)	1,044,961	56.24
Republican	Bob Ehrlich	776,319	41.79
Libertarian	Susan Gaztanaga	14,137	0.76
Green	Maria Allwine	11,825	0.64
Constitution	Eric Knowles	8,612	0.46
Write-in		2,026	0.11
Total votes		1,857,880	100.00
Democratic hold			

== Massachusetts ==
Massachusetts gubernatorial election
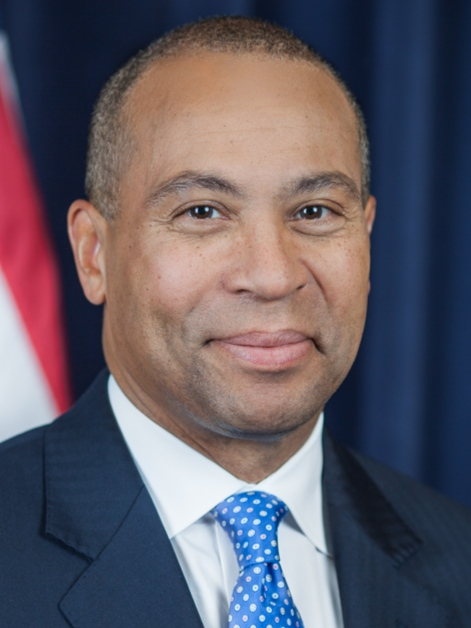

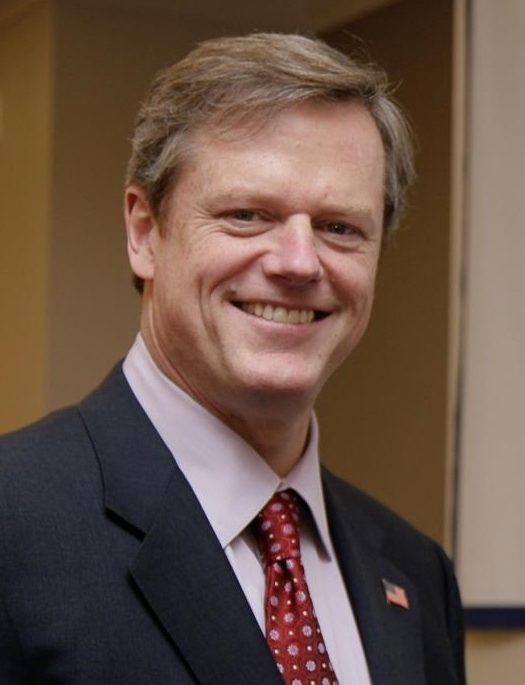

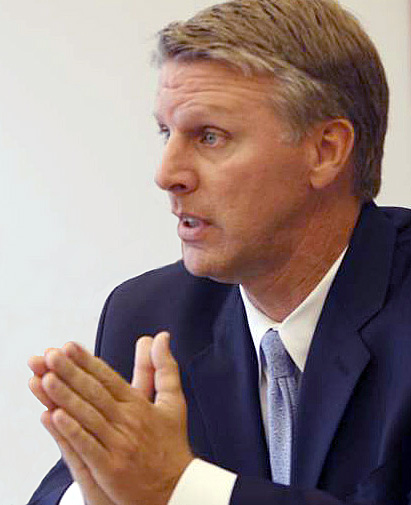
Nominee	Deval Patrick	Charlie Baker	Tim Cahill
Party	Democratic	Republican	Independent
Running mate	Tim Murray	Richard Tisei	Paul Loscocco
Popular vote	1,112,283	964,866	184,395
Percentage	48.4%	42.0%	8.0%
- Municipality results
Governor before election
Deval Patrick
Democratic
Elected Governor
Deval Patrick
Democratic

Incumbent first-term Governor Deval Patrick, a Democrat, sought re-election. He was elected with 56% of the vote in 2006.

Charlie Baker was the Republican candidate, while Jill Stein was the candidate of the Green-Rainbow Party.

Tim Cahill, Treasurer of Massachusetts, ran as an independent. If Cahill had been elected, he would have been the first independent candidate to win statewide in the Commonwealth.

Patrick defeated Baker, Stein, and Cahill in the election.

Massachusetts election
Party	Candidate	Votes	%
Democratic	Deval Patrick (incumbent)	1,112,283	48.42
Republican	Charlie Baker	964,866	42.00
Independent	Tim Cahill	184,395	8.03
Green-Rainbow	Jill Stein	32,895	1.43
Write-in		2,600	0.11
Total votes		2,297,039	100.00
Democratic gain from			

== Michigan ==
Michigan gubernatorial election
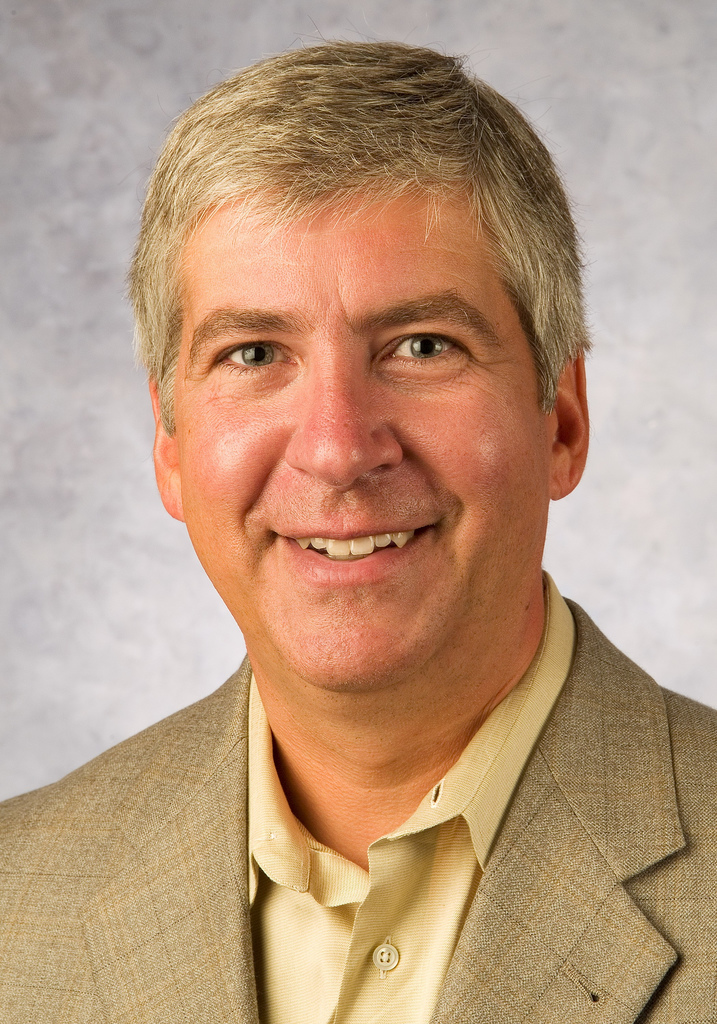

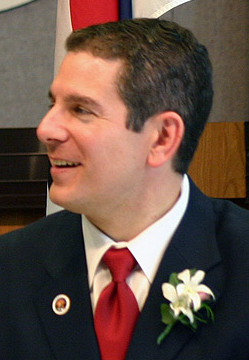
Nominee	Rick Snyder	Virg Bernero
Party	Republican	Democratic
Running mate	Brian Calley	Brenda Lawrence
Popular vote	1,874,834	1,287,320
Percentage	58.1%	39.9%
- County results
Governor before election
Jennifer Granholm
Democratic
Elected Governor
Rick Snyder
Republican

Governor Jennifer Granholm was term-limited in 2010.

The party primaries on August 3 had five Republicans and two Democrats on the ballot.

On the Republican side, businessman Rick Snyder defeated Michigan Attorney General Mike Cox, Oakland County Sheriff Mike Bouchard, Michigan State Senator Tom George and U.S. Representative Peter Hoekstra for the GOP nomination.

On the Democratic side, Lansing Mayor Virg Bernero easily defeated state House Speaker Andy Dillon for the party nomination.

In the general election Rick Snyder defeated Virg Bernero in a landslide.

Michigan election
Party	Candidate	Votes	%
Republican	Rick Snyder	1,874,834	58.11
Democratic	Virgil Bernero	1,287,320	39.90
Libertarian	Ken Proctor	22,390	0.69
Constitution	Stacey Mathia	20,818	0.65
Green	Harley Mikkelson	20,699	0.64
Write-in		27	0.00
Total votes		3,226,088	100.00
Republican gain from Democratic			

== Minnesota ==
Minnesota gubernatorial election
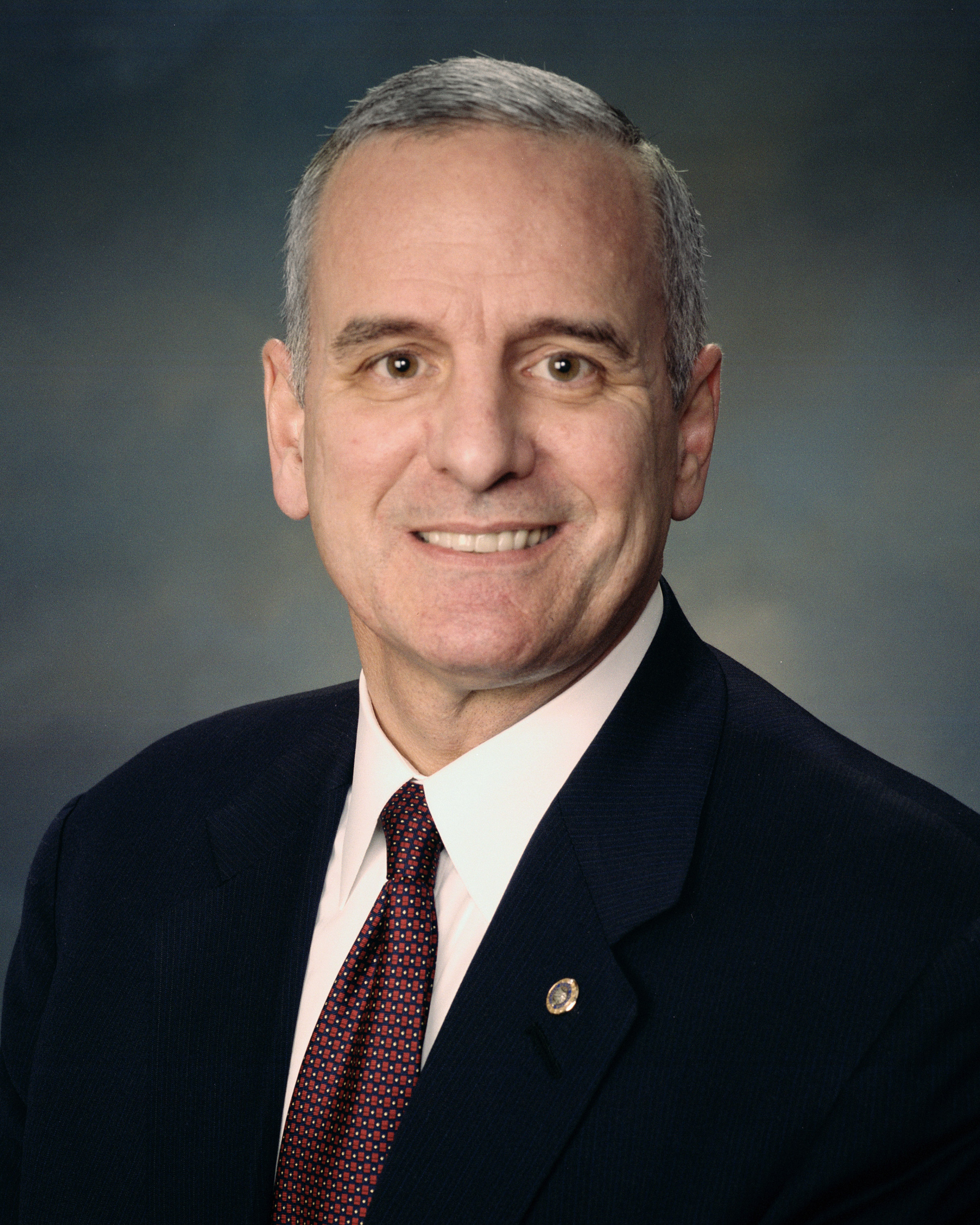

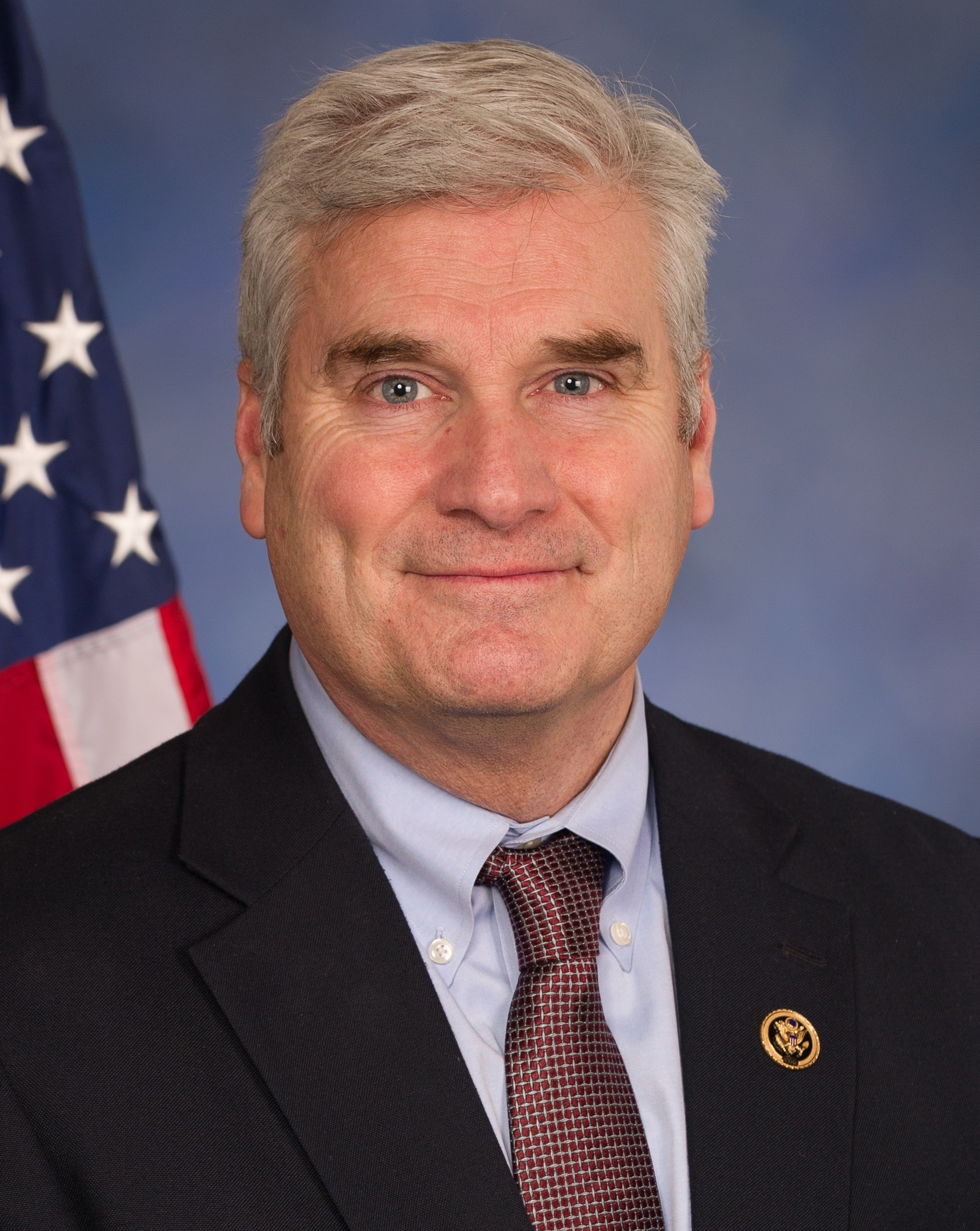

Nominee	Mark Dayton	Tom Emmer	Tom Horner
Party	Democratic (DFL)	Republican	Independence
Running mate	Yvonne Prettner Solon	Annette Meeks	Jim Mulder
Popular vote	919,232	910,462	251,487
Percentage	43.6%	43.2%	11.9%
- County results
Governor before election
Tim Pawlenty
Republican
Elected Governor
Mark Dayton
Democratic (DFL)

Governor Tim Pawlenty would have been eligible to seek a third term in 2010, but decided not to run. He won re-election by 1% in 2006, with 46.7% of the vote.

For Republicans, potential candidates included former U.S. Senator Norm Coleman, former House Minority Leader Marty Seifert, State Representative Tom Emmer, State Senator David Hann, and several other less prominent politicians, such as former State Representative Bill Haas. Former Minnesota State Auditor Patricia Anderson also sought the endorsement briefly, but later withdrew in order to again run for state auditor. As the campaign season progressed, Coleman, Hann and Haas withdrew from the contest.

Among Democrats, former U.S. Senator Mark Dayton, state senator John Marty, former State Representative Matt Entenza, former State Senator Steve Kelley, State Representative Paul Thissen, Minnesota House Speaker Margaret Anderson Kelliher, Ramsey County Attorney Susan Gaertner, State Representative Tom Rukavina, and Minneapolis Mayor R.T. Rybak all announced their candidacies. State Senator Tom Bakk withdrew from the race in March 2010. Saint Paul Mayor Chris Coleman announced that he would not run.

Minnesota House Speaker Margaret Anderson Kelliher won the endorsement of the Minnesota DFL Party, but still faced Mark Dayton and Matt Entenza in the August 10 primary. The Republican Party endorsed State Representative Tom Emmer.

In the primary, Mark Dayton won a narrow victory over DFL-endorsed candidate Margaret Anderson Kelliher. Republican-endorsed candidate Tom Emmer easily won the GOP primary. Independence Party candidate Tom Horner also won his party's primary.

Minnesota election
Party	Candidate	Votes	%
Democratic (DFL)	Mark Dayton	919,232	43.63
Republican	Tom Emmer	910,462	43.21
Independence	Tom Horner	251,487	11.94
Grassroots	Chris Wright	7,516	0.36
Green	Farheen Hakeem	6,188	0.29
Ecology Democracy	Ken Pentel	6,180	0.29
Resource	Linda Eno	4,092	0.19
Write-in		1,864	0.09
Total votes		2,106,979	100.00
Democratic (DFL) gain from Republican			

== Nebraska ==
Nebraska gubernatorial election
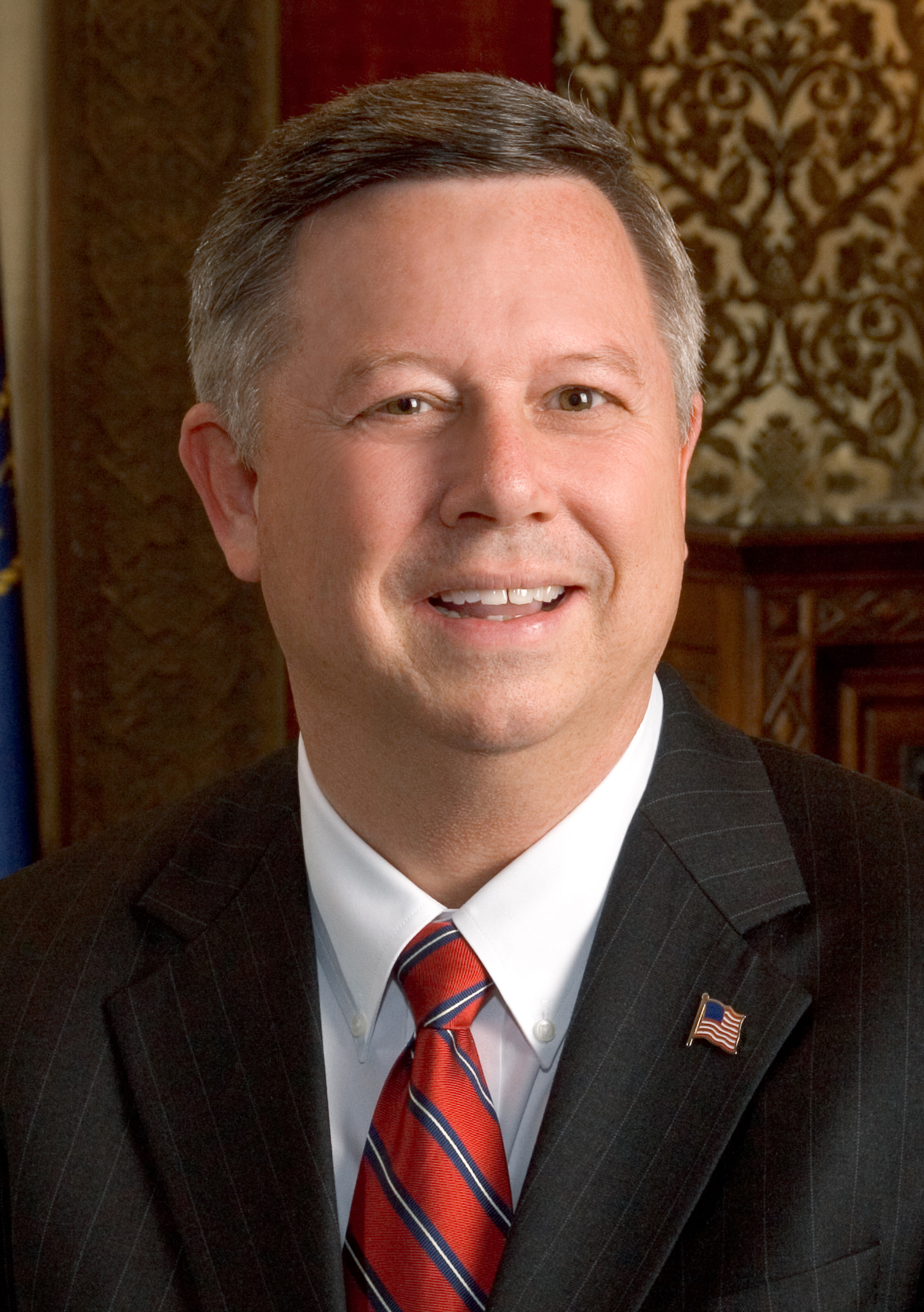

Nominee	Dave Heineman	Mike Meister
Party	Republican	Democratic
Running mate	Rick Sheehy	Anne Boyle
Popular vote	360,645	127,343
Percentage	73.9%	26.1%
- County results
Governor before election
Dave Heineman
Republican
Elected Governor
Dave Heineman
Republican

Governor Dave Heineman succeeded Mike Johanns upon Johanns' confirmation as United States Secretary of Agriculture. Heineman won election in 2006 against David Hahn with 73% of the vote and sought a second term in 2010.

Heineman won re-election.

Nebraska election
Party	Candidate	Votes	%
Republican	Dave Heineman (incumbent)	360,645	73.90
Democratic	Mike Meister	127,343	26.10
Total votes		487,988	100.00
Republican hold			

== Nevada ==
Nevada gubernatorial election
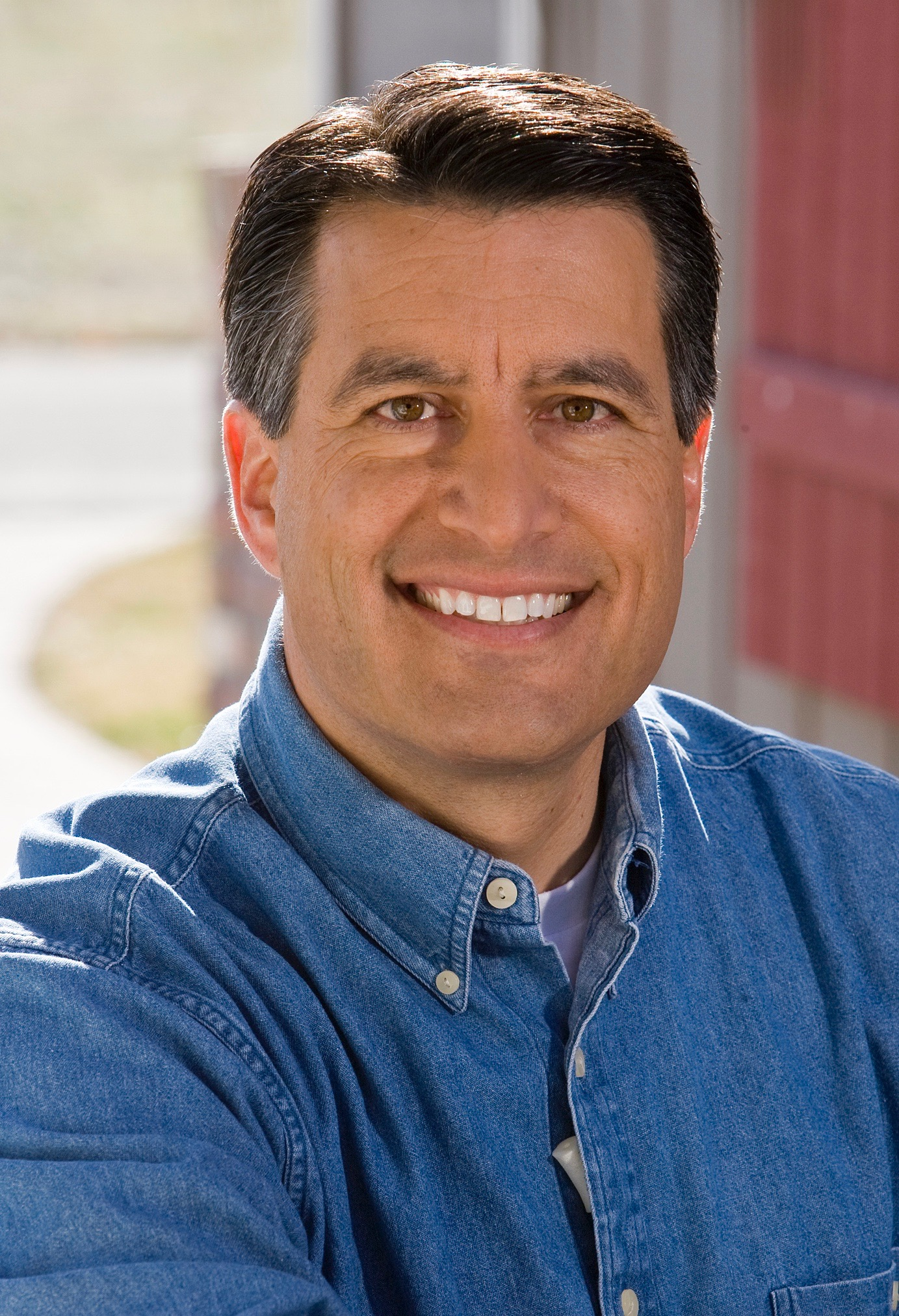

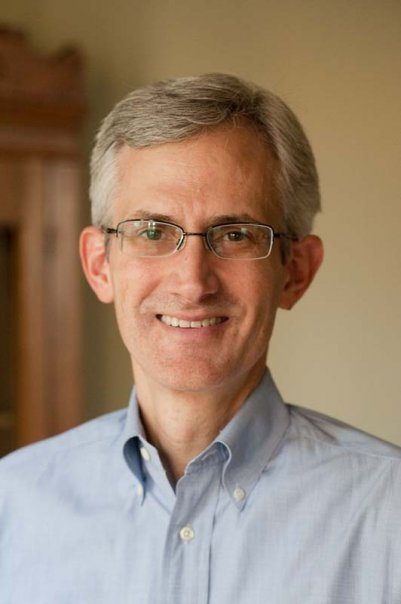
Nominee	Brian Sandoval	Rory Reid
Party	Republican	Democratic
Popular vote	382,350	298,171
Percentage	53.4%	41.6%
- County results
Governor before election
Jim Gibbons
Republican
Elected Governor
Brian Sandoval
Republican

Governor Jim Gibbons sought a second term in 2010. He was elected in 2006 with 48% of the vote. Gibbons, who had low approval ratings in 2009, had two announced challengers before the end of the year from within his own party. Former State Senator Joe Heck and former North Las Vegas Mayor Mike Montandon both announced that they would challenge Gibbons in the Republican primary. Former federal judge Brian Sandoval announced his candidacy for governor in September 2009. On June 8, 2010, Gibbons was defeated in the Republican primary by Sandoval.

The Democratic candidate was Rory Reid, Clark County Commissioner and the son of U.S. Senate Majority Leader Harry Reid.

The Libertarian candidate was Arthur Forest Lampitt, Jr. Before running for office, he was an IT management consultant and small business owner.

The Green candidate was David Scott Curtis, a residential designer and public artist.

Nevada election
Party	Candidate	Votes	%
Republican	Brian Sandoval	382,350	53.36
Democratic	Rory Reid	298,171	41.61
	None of These Candidates	12,231	1.71
Independent	Eugene DiSimone	6,403	0.89
Independent American	Floyd Fitzgibbons	5,049	0.70
Libertarian	Arthur Forest Lampitt	4,672	0.65
Green	David Scott Curtis	4,437	0.62
Independent	Aaron Y. Honig	3,216	0.45
Total votes		716,529	100.00
Republican hold			

== New Hampshire ==
New Hampshire gubernatorial election
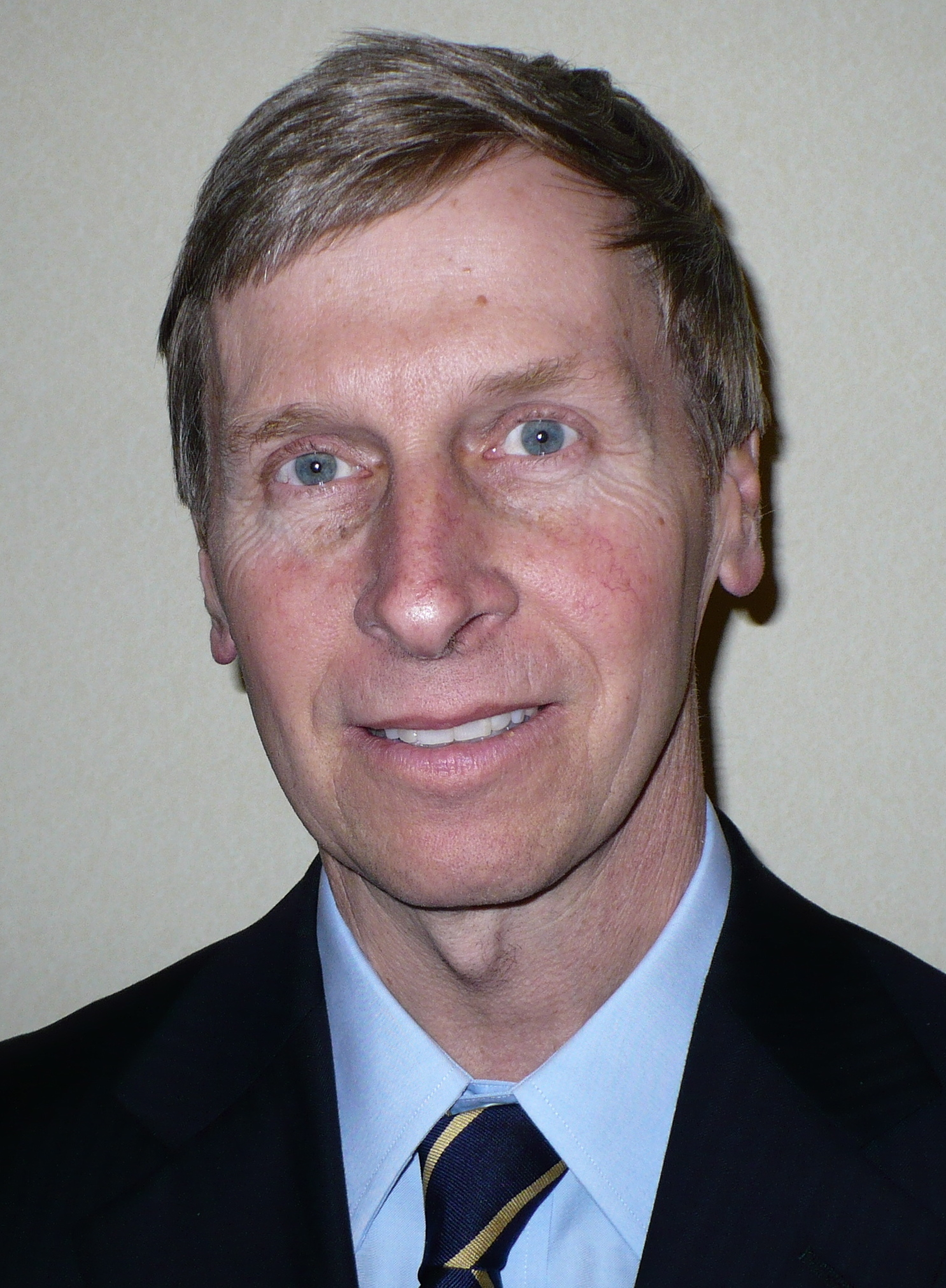

Nominee	John Lynch	John Stephen
Party	Democratic	Republican
Popular vote	240,346	205,616
Percentage	52.6%	45.0%
- County results
Governor before election
John Lynch
Democratic
Elected Governor
John Lynch
Democratic

Governor John Lynch sought re-election in 2010. (The governors of New Hampshire and Vermont serve two-year terms.) He was re-elected with 70% of the vote in 2008.

Lynch was re-elected.

New Hampshire election
Party	Candidate	Votes	%
Democratic	John Lynch	240,346	52.63
Republican	John Stephen	205,616	45.03
Libertarian	John Babiarz	10,089	2.21
Write-in		537	0.01
Total votes		456,588	100.00
Democratic hold			

== New Mexico ==
New Mexico gubernatorial election
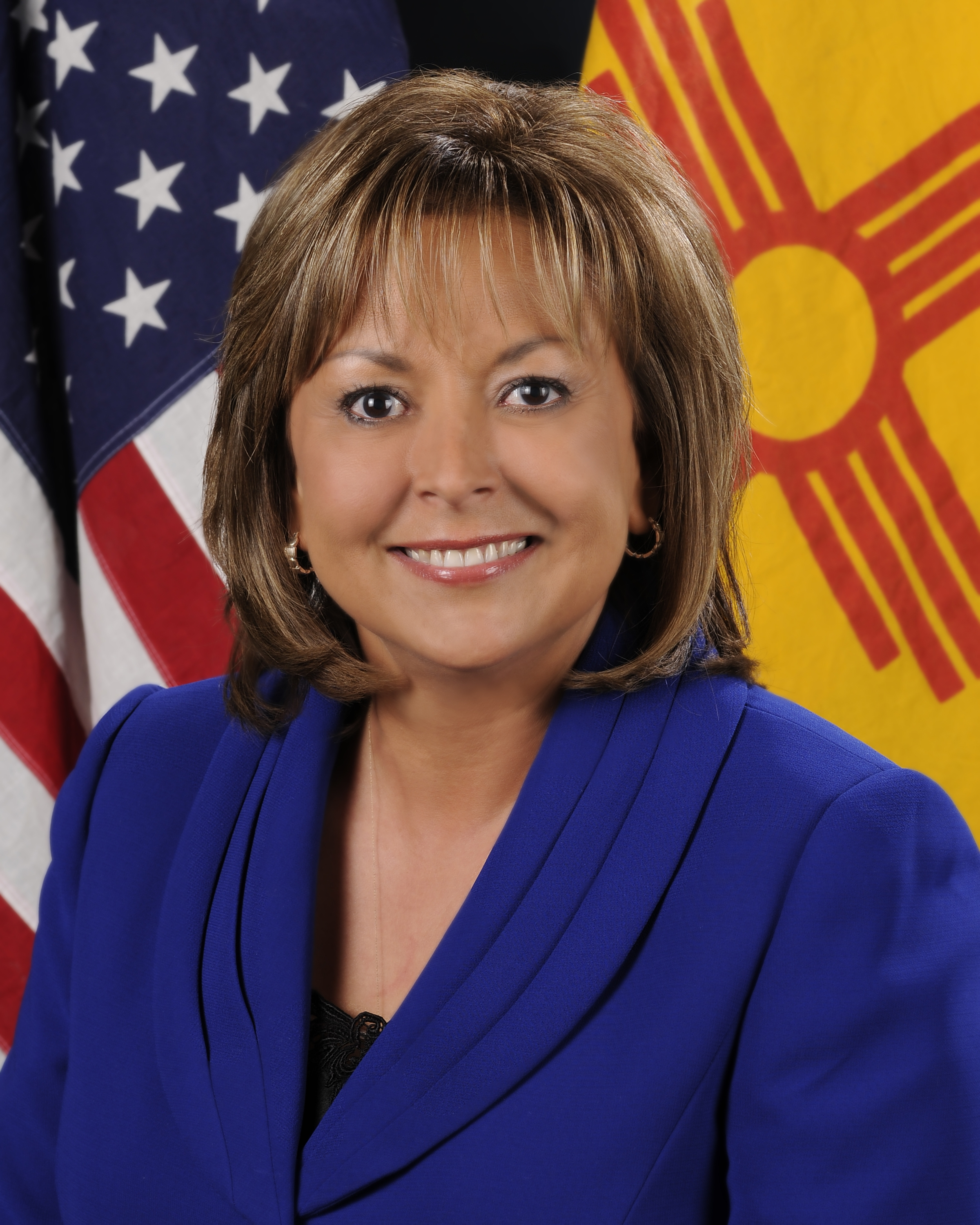

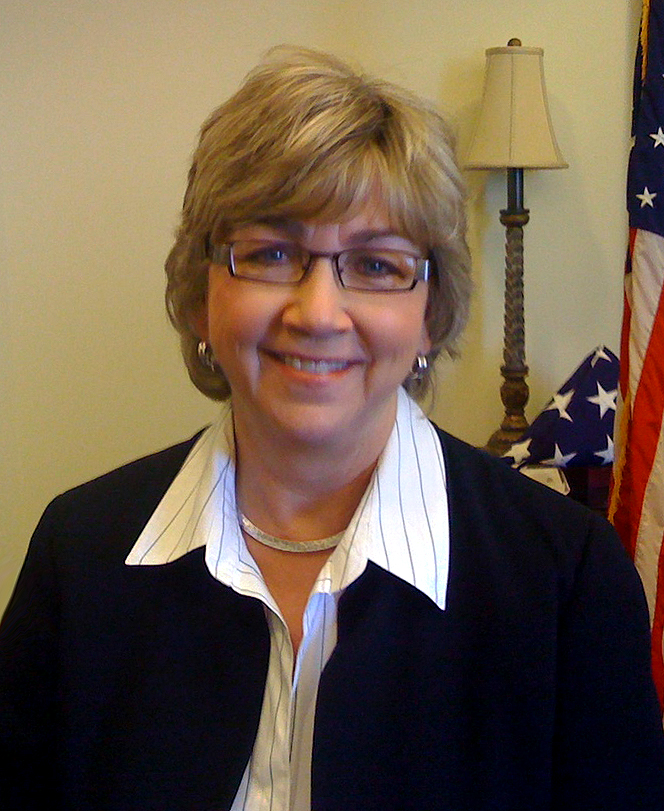
Nominee	Susana Martinez	Diane Denish
Party	Republican	Democratic
Running mate	John Sanchez	Brian Colón
Popular vote	321,219	280,614
Percentage	53.3%	46.6%
- County results
Governor before election
Bill Richardson
Democratic
Elected Governor
Susana Martinez
Republican

Governor Bill Richardson was term-limited in 2010.

Lieutenant Governor Diane Denish (D) obtained the Democratic Party nomination by winning the June 1, 2010 primary without opposition.

Doña Ana County District Attorney Susana Martinez won the Republican nominee for Governor of New Mexico by winning the June 1, 2010 primary with 51% of the vote against four other candidates. Martinez is the first Latina woman nominated by a major party for governor anywhere in the United States. Martinez defeated PR firm owner Doug Turner, Pete Domenici, Jr. (son of the former U.S. Senator Pete Domenici), State Representative Janice Arnold-Jones, and former Republican party state chairman Allen Weh. The election resulted in New Mexico's first female governor. Martinez defeated Denish and became the nation's first Latina governor and first female governor of New Mexico.

New Mexico election
Party	Candidate	Votes	%
Republican	Susana Martinez	321,219	53.29
Democratic	Diane Denish	280,614	46.55
Write-in		994	0.16
Total votes		602,832	100.00
Republican gain from Democratic			

== New York ==
New York gubernatorial election
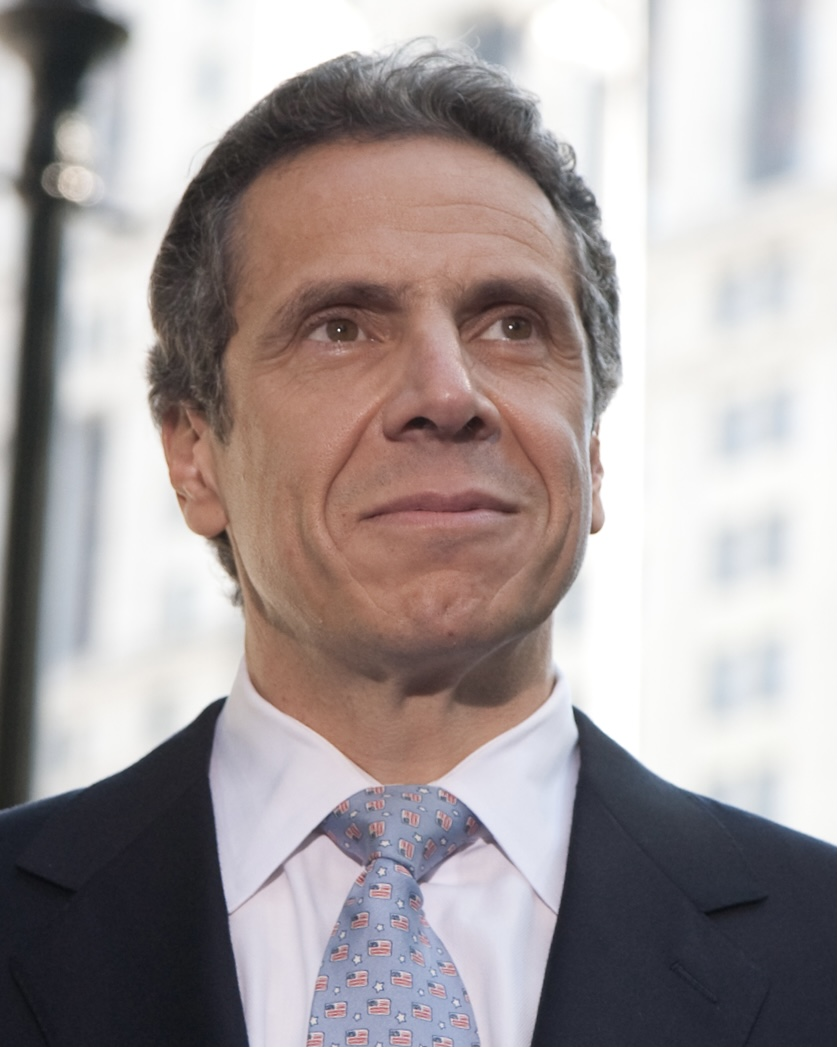

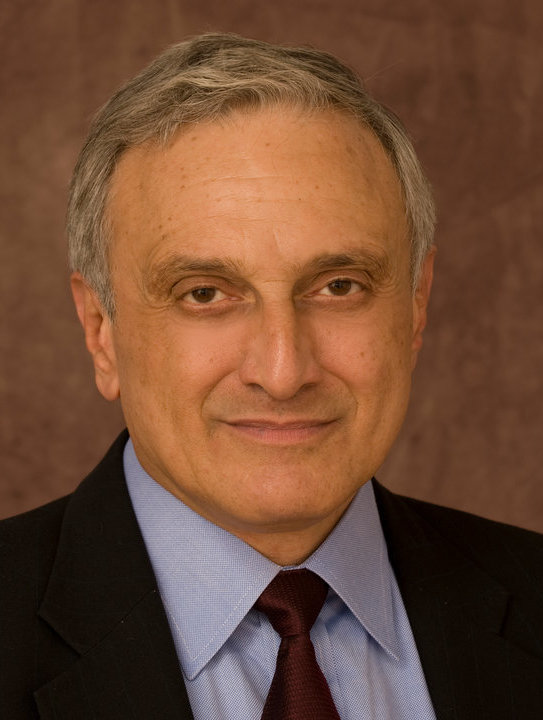
Nominee	Andrew Cuomo	Carl Paladino
Party	Democratic	Republican
Alliance	Working Families; Independence	Conservative; Taxpayers
Running mate	Robert Duffy	Greg Edwards
Popular vote	2,910,876	1,547,857
Percentage	63.0%	33.5%
- County results
Governor before election
David Paterson
Democratic
Elected Governor
Andrew Cuomo
Democratic

Governor David Paterson originally announced he would seek a first full term in 2010. He became Governor of New York when Eliot Spitzer resigned amid a prostitution scandal on March 17, 2008. He was likely to face a tough primary challenge from Attorney General Andrew Cuomo, who led him (and all other opponents) in polling. Paterson announced on February 26, 2010, that he would not be a candidate in the Democratic primary; Cuomo entered the race on May 24 of the same year. Businessman Carl Paladino defeated former Congressman Rick Lazio for the Republican nomination in a primary election, drawing heavily on support from upstate New York. Cuomo soundly defeated Paladino in the general election.

New York election
Party	Candidate	Votes	%
Democratic	Andrew Cuomo	2,609,465	56.52
Working Families	Andrew Cuomo	154,835	3.35
Independence	Andrew Cuomo	146,576	3.17
Total	Andrew Cuomo	2,910,876	63.05
Republican	Carl Paladino	1,289,817	27.94
Conservative	Carl Paladino	232,215	5.03
Taxpayers	Carl Paladino	25,825	0.56
Total	Carl Paladino	1,547,857	33.53
Green	Howie Hawkins	59,906	1.30
Libertarian	Warren Redlich	48,359	1.05
Rent Is Too Damn High	Jimmy McMillan	41,129	0.89
Freedom	Charles Barron	24,571	0.53
Anti-Prohibition	Kristin M. Davis	20,421	0.44
Write-in		4,836	0.10
Total votes		4,769,741	100.00
Democratic hold			

== Ohio ==
Ohio gubernatorial election
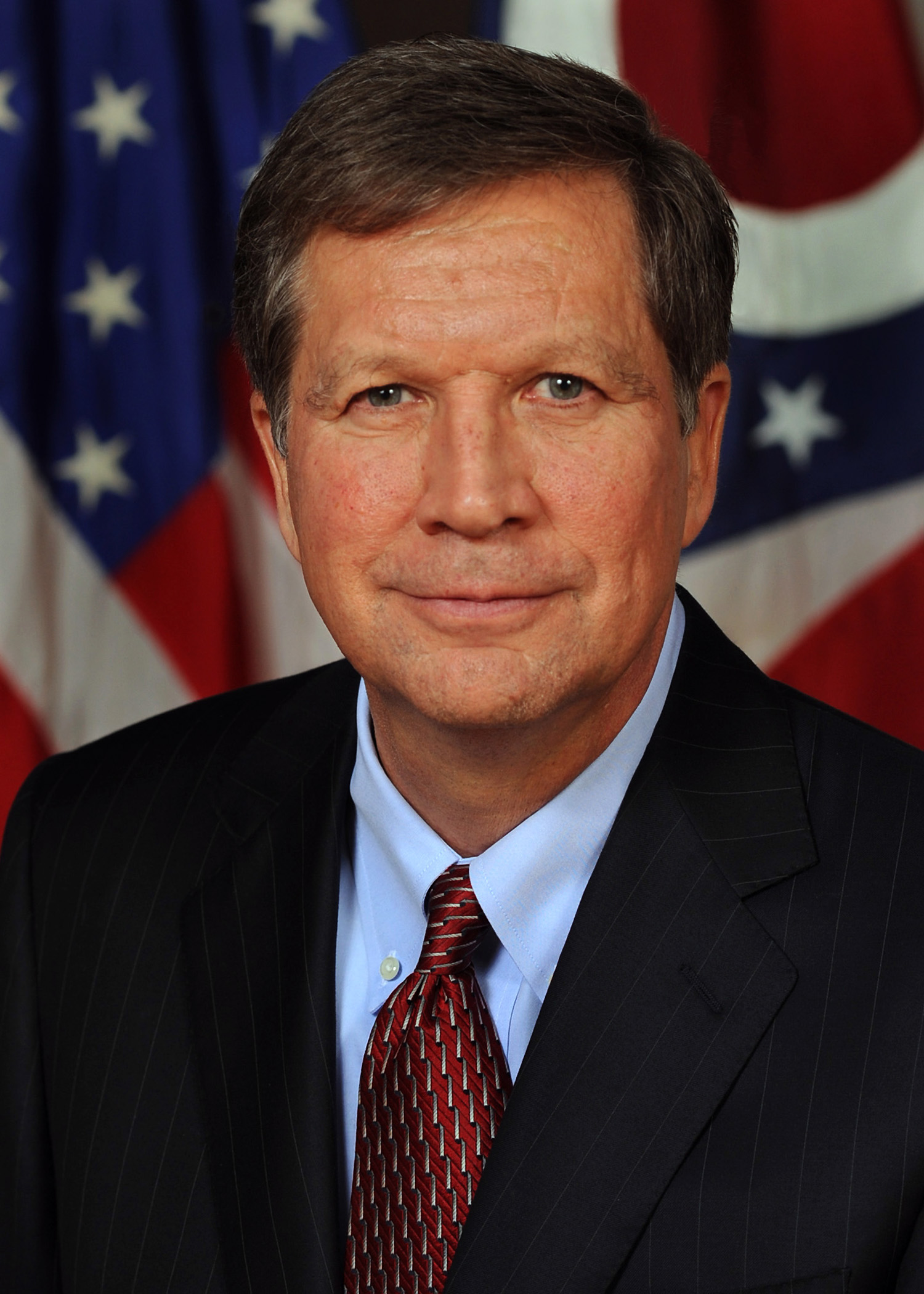

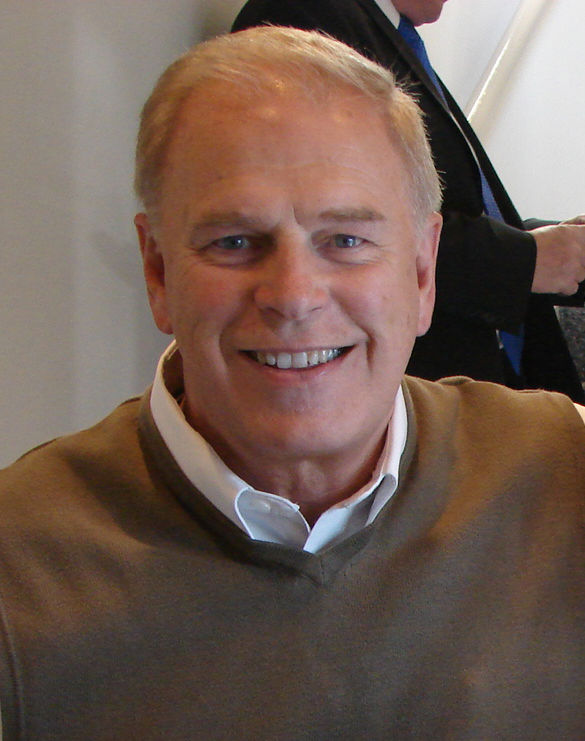
Nominee	John Kasich	Ted Strickland
Party	Republican	Democratic
Running mate	Mary Taylor	Yvette McGee Brown
Popular vote	1,889,186	1,812,059
Percentage	49.0%	47.0%
- County results
Governor before election
Ted Strickland
Democratic
Elected Governor
John Kasich
Republican

Governor Ted Strickland sought a second term in 2010. He was elected with 60% of the vote in 2006.

John Kasich, a former congressman from Ohio's 12th congressional district and Chairman of the United States House Committee on the Budget was the Republican nominee. Recent polling showed this race to be competitive, with Rasmussen Reports polling in August 2010 showing John Kasich ahead of incumbent Governor Strickland by a 47 to 39% margin. A survey from Public Policy Polling from the same month found similar results, with Governor Strickland trailing former Congressman Kasich by a 50 to 40% margin.

Kasich defeated then-sitting Governor Strickland in the election.

Ohio election
Party	Candidate	Votes	%
Republican	John Kasich	1,889,186	49.04
Democratic	Ted Strickland (incumbent)	1,812,059	47.04
Libertarian	Ken Matesz	92,116	2.39
Green	Dennis Spisak	58,475	1.52
Write-in		633	0.02
Total votes		3,852,469	100.00
Republican gain from Democratic			

== Oklahoma ==
Oklahoma gubernatorial election
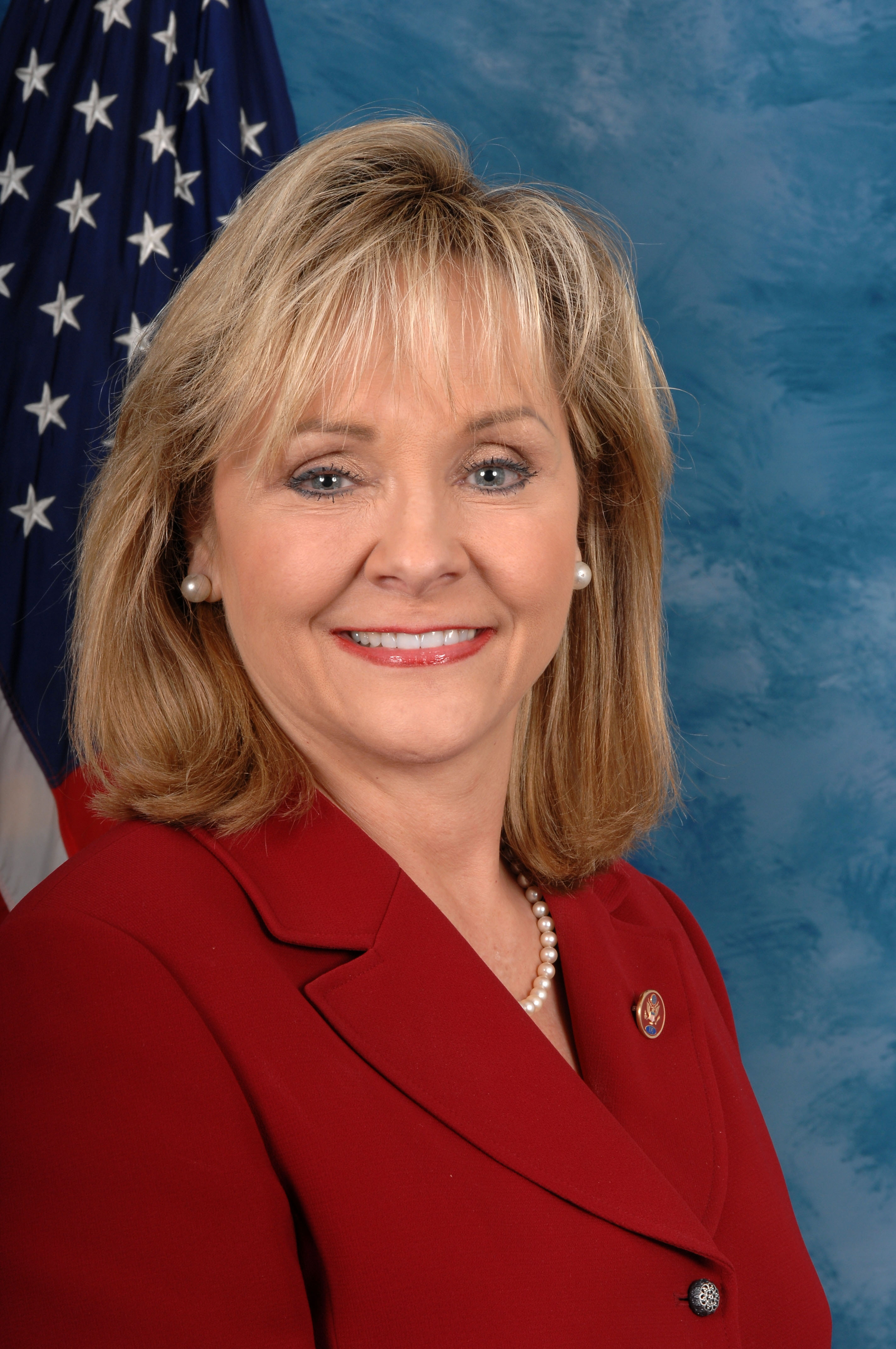

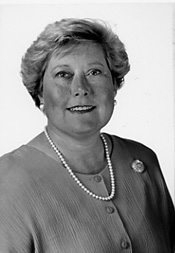
Nominee	Mary Fallin	Jari Askins
Party	Republican	Democratic
Popular vote	625,506	409,261
Percentage	60.4%	39.6%
- County results
Governor before election
Brad Henry
Democratic
Elected Governor
Mary Fallin
Republican

Democratic Governor Brad Henry was term-limited in 2010.

Two Democrats announced their candidacies: state Attorney General Drew Edmondson, and Lieutenant Governor Jari Askins, who would be Oklahoma's first female governor.

Two Republicans announced their candidacies: Congresswoman and former lieutenant governor Mary Fallin, who would also be Oklahoma's first female governor, and state Senator Randy Brogdon. Oklahoma, which tilts Republican in party affiliation, was considered a strong pickup opportunity for the GOP. Either outcome would have resulted in Oklahoma's first female governor, as both Fallin and Askins won their primaries; Fallin defeated Askins in the general election.

Oklahoma election
Party	Candidate	Votes	%
Republican	Mary Fallin	625,506	60.45
Democratic	Jari Askins	409,261	39.55
Total votes		1,034,767	100.00
Republican gain from Democratic			

== Oregon ==
Oregon gubernatorial election
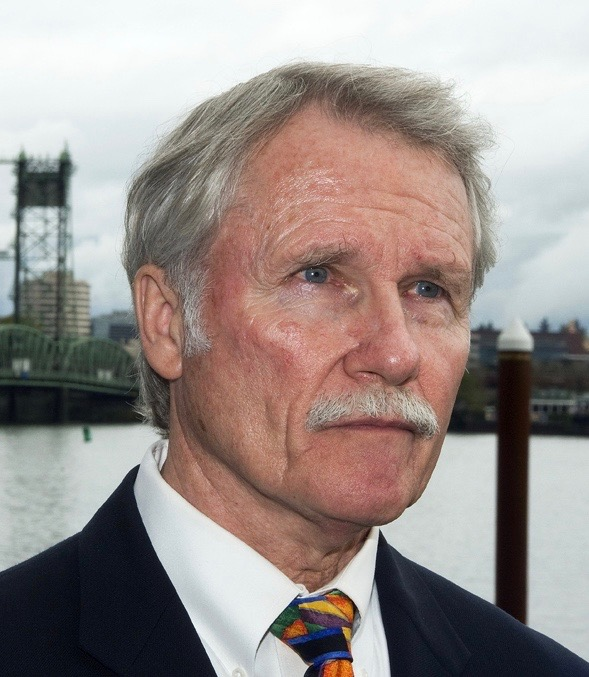

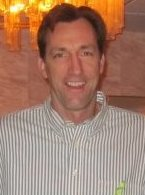
Nominee	John Kitzhaber	Chris Dudley
Party	Democratic	Republican
Alliance	Independent Party
Popular vote	716,525	694,287
Percentage	49.3%	47.8%
- County results
Governor before election
Ted Kulongoski
Democratic
Elected Governor
John Kitzhaber
Democratic

Governor Ted Kulongoski was term-limited in 2010. Former two-term Governor John Kitzhaber was the Democratic nominee and former Portland Trail Blazers basketball player Chris Dudley was his Republican opponent. In the primaries, Kitzhaber defeated former state Secretary of State Bill Bradbury, and Dudley won a plurality among a large field of candidates which included former Oregon State Treasurer candidate Allen Alley and former state Representative John Lim. Greg Kord of the Constitution Party and Wes Wagner of the Libertarian Party also ran. Kitzhaber defeated Dudley in the general election; his election marked the first time in Oregon that a person had been elected to three terms as governor.

Oregon election
Party	Candidate	Votes	%
Democratic	John Kitzhaber	716,525	49.29
Republican	Chris Dudley	694,287	47.76
Constitution	Greg Kord	20,475	1.41
Libertarian	Wes Wagner	19,048	1.31
Write-in		3,213	0.22
Total votes		1,453,548	100.00
Democratic hold			

== Pennsylvania ==
Pennsylvania gubernatorial election
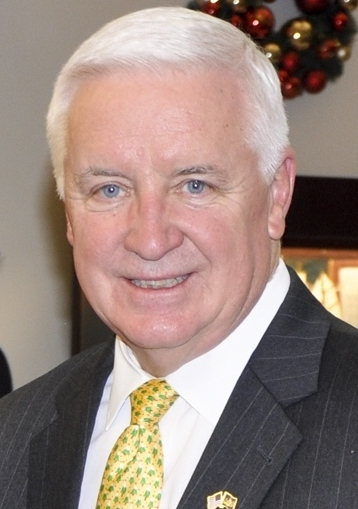

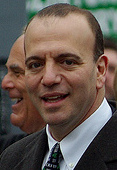
Nominee	Tom Corbett	Dan Onorato
Party	Republican	Democratic
Running mate	Jim Cawley	Scott Conklin
Popular vote	2,172,763	1,814,788
Percentage	54.5%	45.5%
- County results
Governor before election
Ed Rendell
Democratic
Elected Governor
Tom Corbett
Republican

Governor Ed Rendell was term-limited in 2010.

Republican Attorney General Tom Corbett was the Republican nominee for governor. Republican Congressman Jim Gerlach had formed an exploratory committee and initiated a campaign in 2009, but he eventually dropped out of the race in early 2010 in order to run for re-election to his seat in the House. The Democratic nominee was Allegheny County Executive Dan Onorato. Corbett was considered the marginal favorite in a competitive election, and defeated Onorato.

Pennsylvania election
Party	Candidate	Votes	%
Republican	Tom Corbett	2,172,763	54.49
Democratic	Dan Onorato	1,814,788	45.51
Total votes		3,987,551	100.00
Republican gain from Democratic			

== Rhode Island ==
Rhode Island gubernatorial election
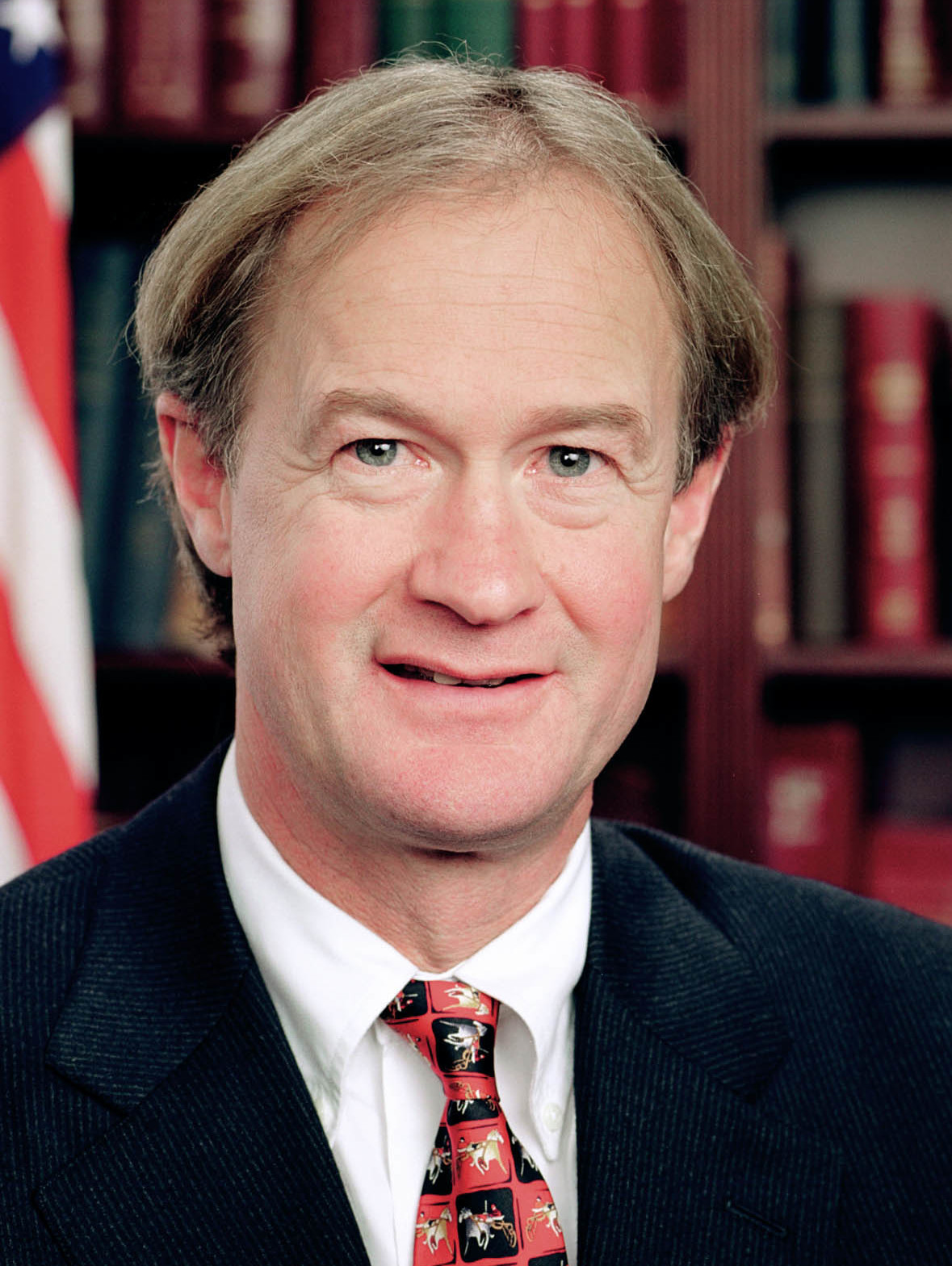

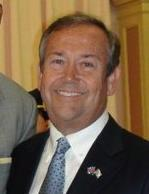

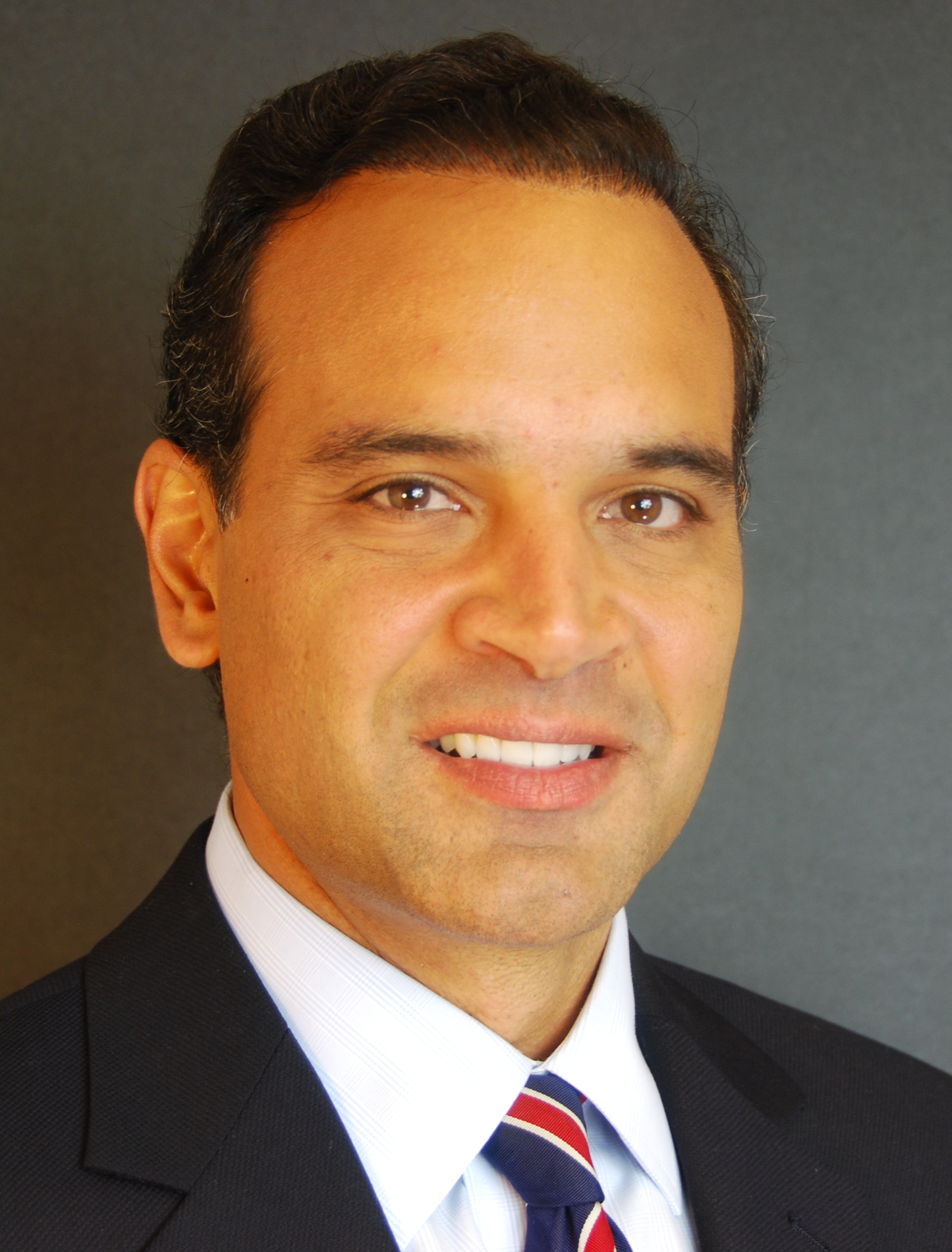

Nominee	Lincoln Chafee	John Robitaille
Party	Independent	Republican
Popular vote	123,571	114,911
Percentage	36.1%	33.6%
Nominee	Frank T. Caprio	Ken Block
Party	Democratic	Moderate
Popular vote	78,896	22,146
Percentage	23.1%	6.5%
- County results
Governor before election
Donald Carcieri
Republican
Elected Governor
Lincoln Chafee
Independent

Governor Donald Carcieri was term-limited in 2010.

State Representative Joe Trillo was a potential Republican candidate.

On the Democratic side, State General Treasurer Frank Caprio was the de facto nominee, with Attorney General Patrick C. Lynch dropping out of the race for governor.

Former Republican Senator Lincoln D. Chafee formed an exploratory committee for a potential campaign as an independent. After deciding to run, Senator Chafee went on to win the election.

Rhode Island election
Party	Candidate	Votes	%
Independent	Lincoln Chafee	123,571	36.10
Republican	John Robitaille	114,911	33.57
Democratic	Frank T. Caprio	78,896	23.05
Moderate	Ken Block	22,146	6.47
Independent	Joseph Lusi	1,091	0.32
Independent	Todd Giroux	882	0.26
Independent	Ronald Algieri	793	0.23
Total votes		342,290	100.00
Independent gain from Republican			

== South Carolina ==
South Carolina gubernatorial election
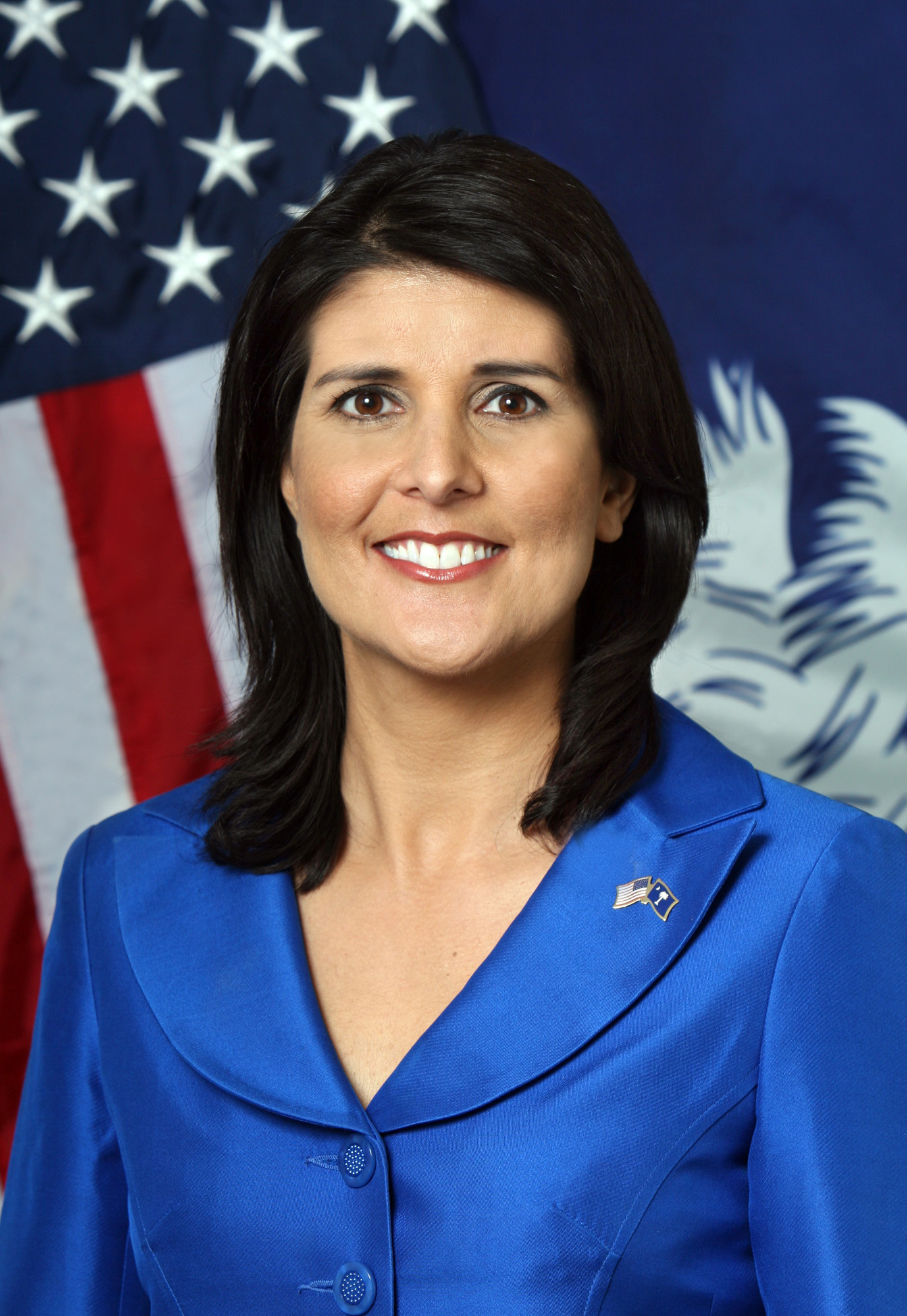

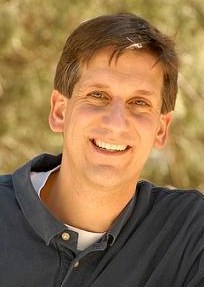
Nominee	Nikki Haley	Vincent Sheheen
Party	Republican	Democratic
Popular vote	690,525	630,534
Percentage	51.4%	46.9%
- County results
Governor before election
Mark Sanford
Republican
Elected Governor
Nikki Haley
Republican

Governor Mark Sanford was term-limited in 2010.

On the Republican side, State Representative Nikki Haley ran, defeating Congressman Gresham Barrett in a June 22, 2010 run-off election. She had the potential to become the state's first female governor as well as its first Indian governor.

On the Democratic side, Vincent Sheheen was the candidate, having defeated all other candidates in the primary election.

Haley defeated Sheheen in the election and became South Carolina's first female governor.

South Carolina election
Party	Candidate	Votes	%
Republican	Nikki Haley	690,525	51.37
Democratic	Vincent Sheheen	630,534	46.91
United Citizens	Morgan B. Reeves	20,114	1.50
Write-in		3,025	0.23
Total votes		1,344,198	100.00
Republican hold			

== South Dakota ==
South Dakota gubernatorial election
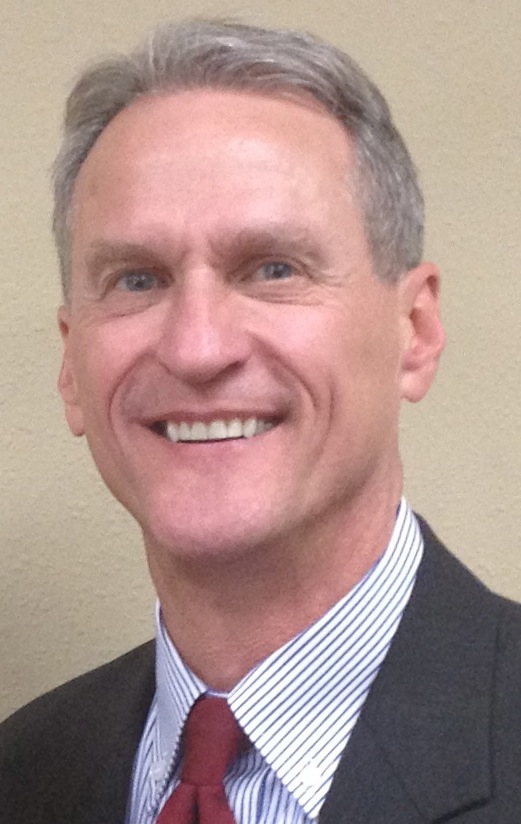

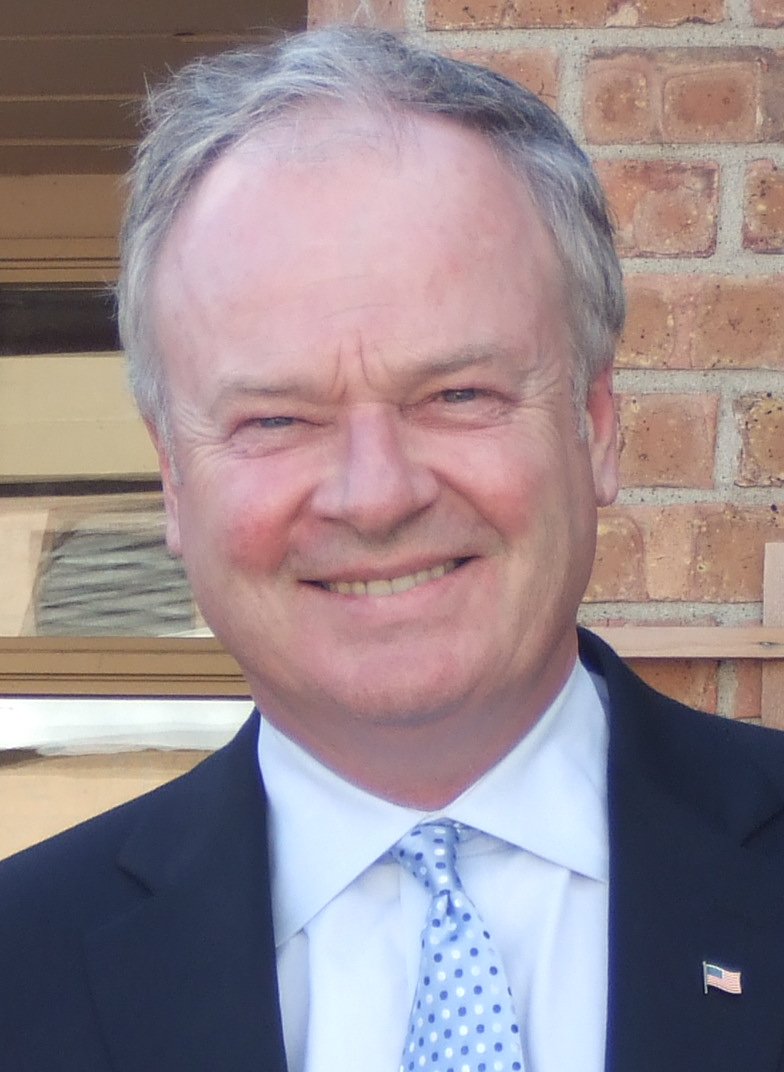
Nominee	Dennis Daugaard	Scott Heidepriem
Party	Republican	Democratic
Popular vote	195,046	122,037
Percentage	61.5%	38.5%
- County results
Governor before election
Mike Rounds
Republican
Elected Governor
Dennis Daugaard
Republican

Governor Mike Rounds was term-limited in 2010.

On the Republican side, State Senators Dave Knudson and Gordon Howie, Lieutenant Governor Dennis Daugaard, Brookings Mayor Scott Munsterman, and rancher Ken Knuppe announced that they were running.

On the Democratic side, state Senator Scott Heidepriem, who announced his candidacy in July 2009, ran unopposed. United States Representative Stephanie Herseth Sandlin, who represented the state at-large in the United States House of Representatives, announced that she would run for re-election rather than for Governor or the Senate seat held by incumbent John Thune in 2010.

South Dakota election
Party	Candidate	Votes	%
Republican	Dennis Daugaard	195,046	61.51
Democratic	Scott Heidepriem	122,037	38.49
Total votes		317,083	100.00
Republican hold			

== Tennessee ==
Tennessee gubernatorial election
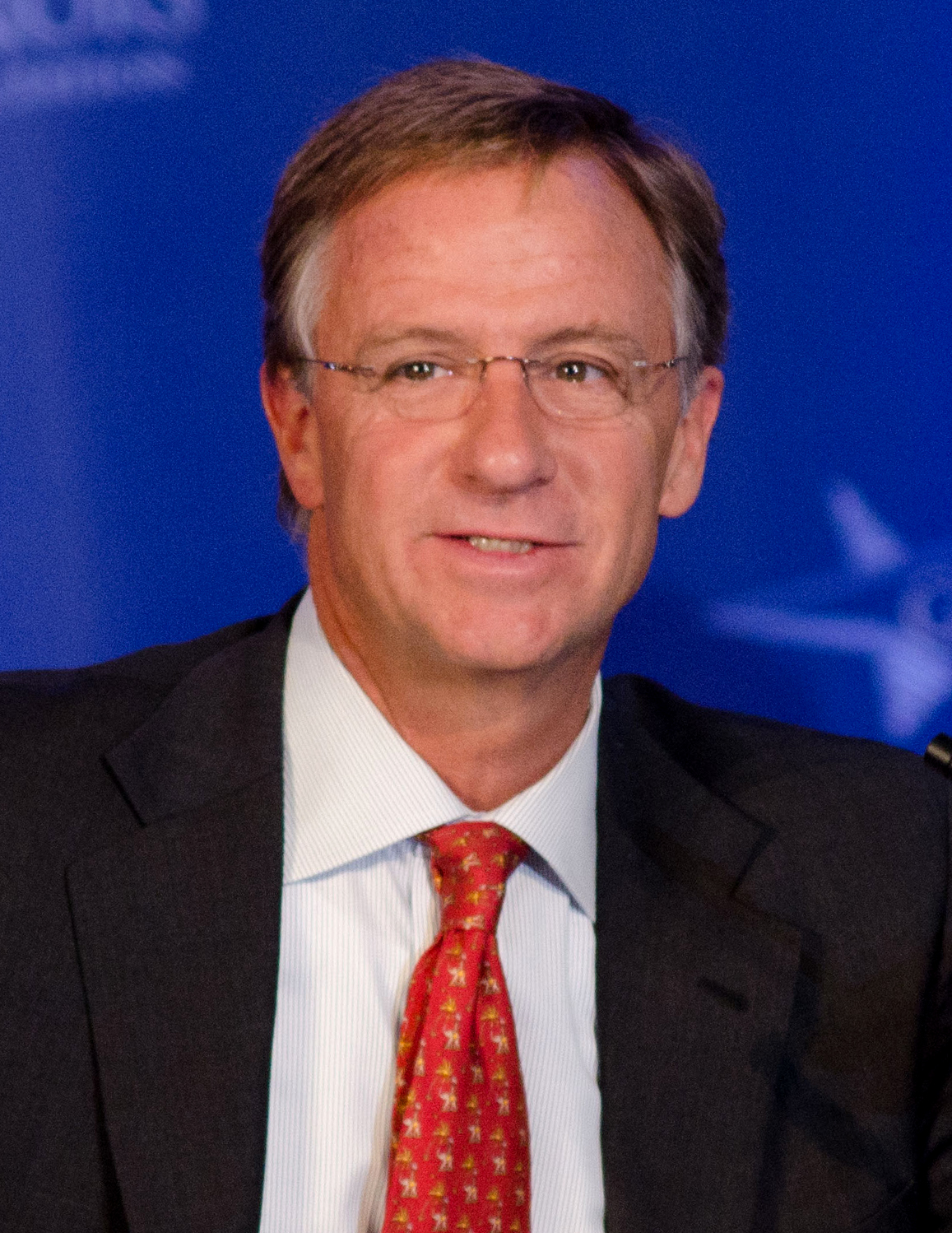

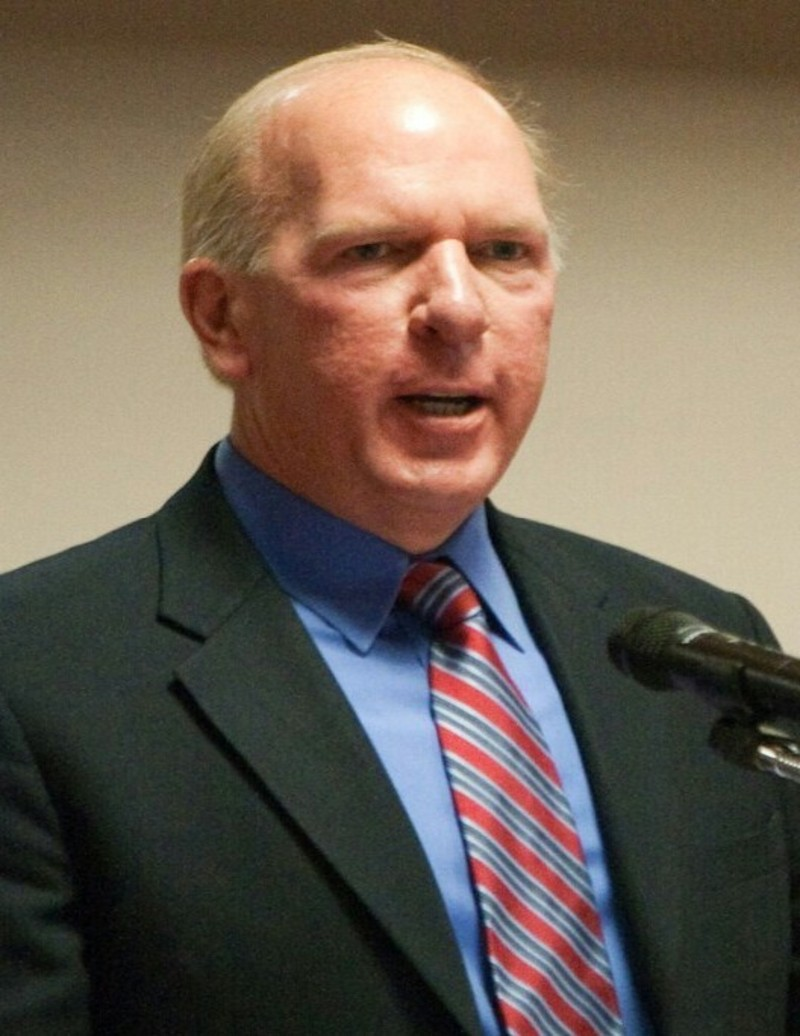
Nominee	Bill Haslam	Mike McWherter
Party	Republican	Democratic
Popular vote	1,041,545	529,851
Percentage	65.0%	33.1%
- County results
Governor before election
Phil Bredesen
Democratic
Elected Governor
Bill Haslam
Republican

Democratic Governor Phil Bredesen was term-limited in 2010.

On the Republican side, Congressman Zach Wamp of the state's 3rd District, Knoxville Mayor Bill Haslam, and military veteran, internet sensation, and activist Basil Marceaux and Lieutenant Governor Ron Ramsey announced their candidacies. Haslam was the Republican nominee for governor.

Businessman Mike McWherter, son of former Tennessee governor Ned McWherter ran for the Democratic nomination.

There were several independent candidates as well, including Toni K. Hall, a college economics instructor.

Several non-partisan sources determined that the race was leaning Republican, and Haslam soundly defeated McWherter.

Tennessee election
Party	Candidate	Votes	%
Republican	Bill Haslam	1,041,545	65.03
Democratic	Mike McWherter	529,851	33.08
Independent	Carl Twofeathers Whitaker	6,536	0.41
Independent	Brandon Dodds	4,728	0.29
Independent	Bayron Binkley	4,663	0.29
Independent	June Griffin	2,587	0.16
Independent	Linda Kay Perry	2,057	0.13
Independent	Howard M. Switzer	1,887	0.12
Independent	Samuel David Duck	1,755	0.11
Independent	Thomas Smith II	1,207	0.07
Independent	Toni K. Hall	993	0.06
Independent	David Gatchell	859	0.05
Independent	Boyce T. McCall	828	0.05
Independent	James Reesor	809	0.05
Independent	Mike Knois	600	0.03
Independent	Donald Ray McFolin	583	0.03
Write-in		61	0.00
Total votes		1,601,567	100.00
Republican gain from Democratic			

== Texas ==
Texas gubernatorial election
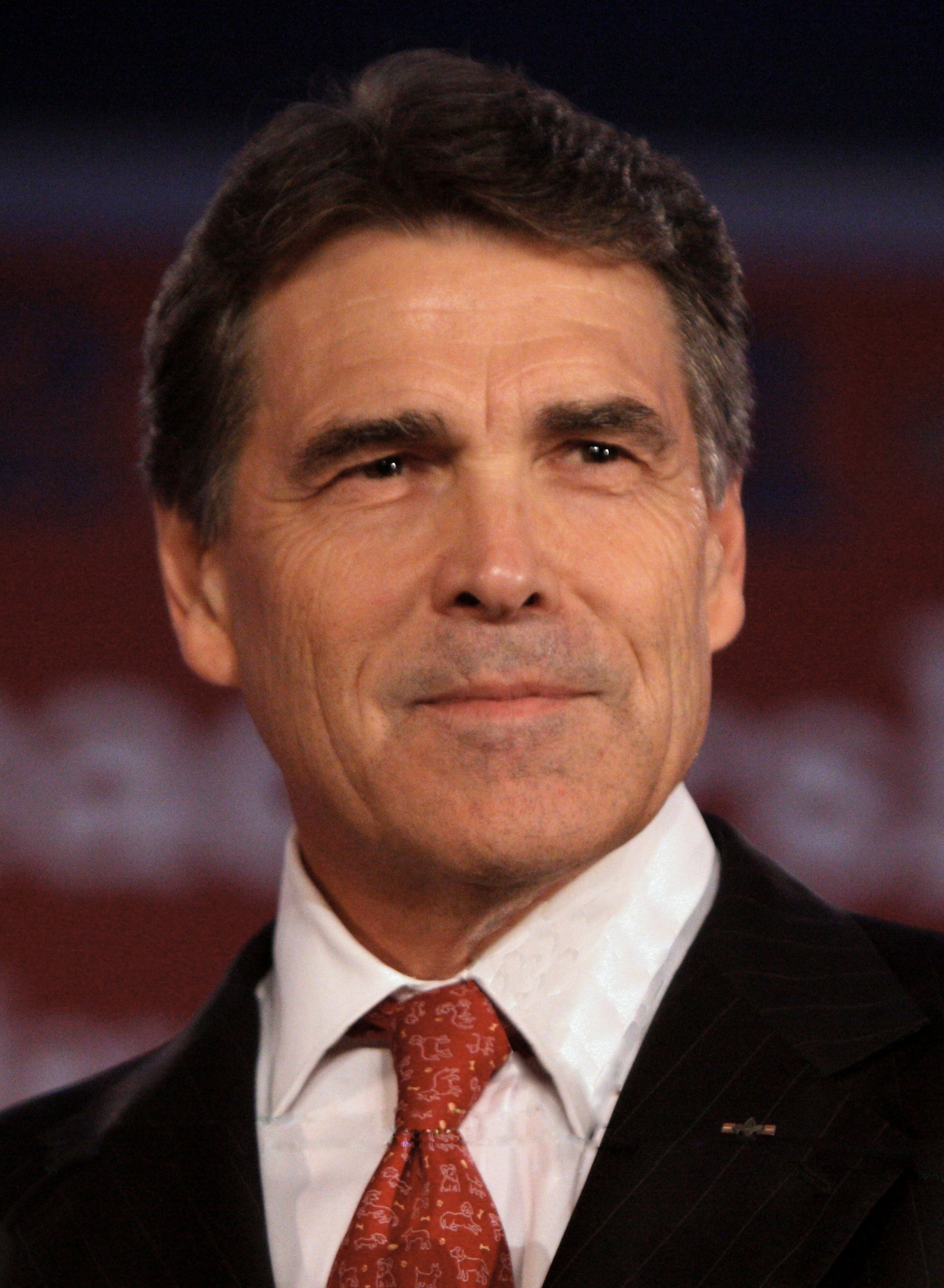

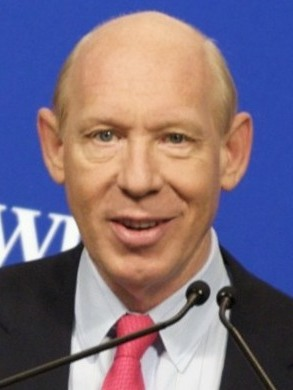
Nominee	Rick Perry	Bill White
Party	Republican	Democratic
Popular vote	2,737,481	2,106,395
Percentage	55.0%	42.3%
- County results
Governor before election
Rick Perry
Republican
Elected Governor
Rick Perry
Republican

Texas Governor Rick Perry won the GOP gubernatorial primary with 51% of the vote on March 2, 2010. Perry sought a third full term, as the longest-serving governor in the history of Texas. U.S. Senator Kay Bailey Hutchison challenged Perry in the Republican primary. On December 4, 2008, Hutchison filed papers to set up an exploratory committee and confirmed in July 2009 that she would be making her official entry into the race in August. Perry led in primary and general election match-ups, according to aggregate polling. Dedra Medina also challenged Perry and Hutchison for Republican nomination.

Former Houston Mayor Bill White won the Texas Democratic primary, beating Houston businessman Farouk Shami.

Perry defeated White in the election.

Texas election
Party	Candidate	Votes	%
Republican	Rick Perry (incumbent)	2,737,481	54.97
Democratic	Bill White	2,106,395	42.30
Libertarian	Kathie Glass	109,211	2.19
Green	Deb Shafto	19,516	0.39
Write-in		7,267	0.15
Total votes		4,979,870	100.00
Republican hold			

== Utah (special) ==
Utah gubernatorial special election
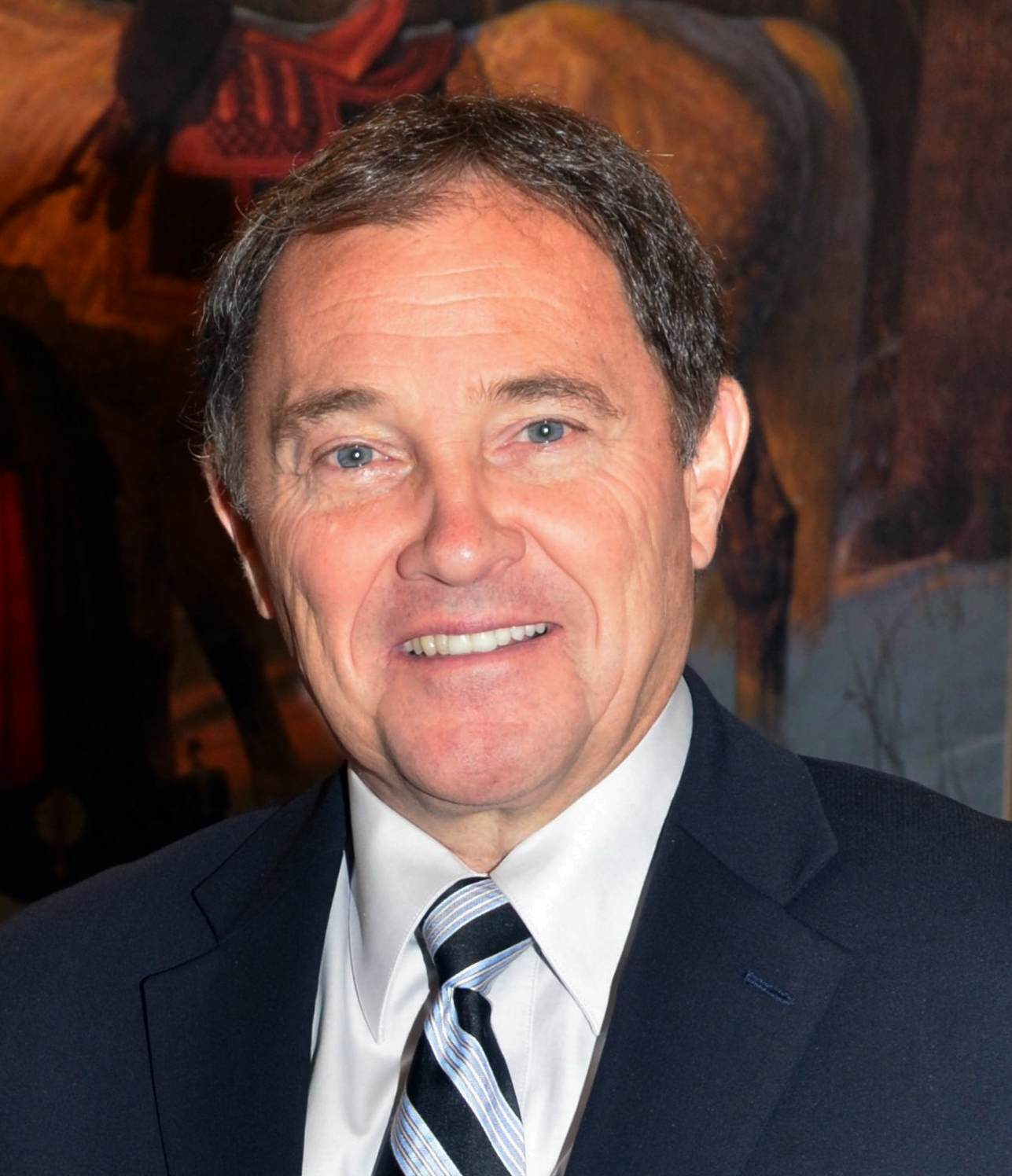

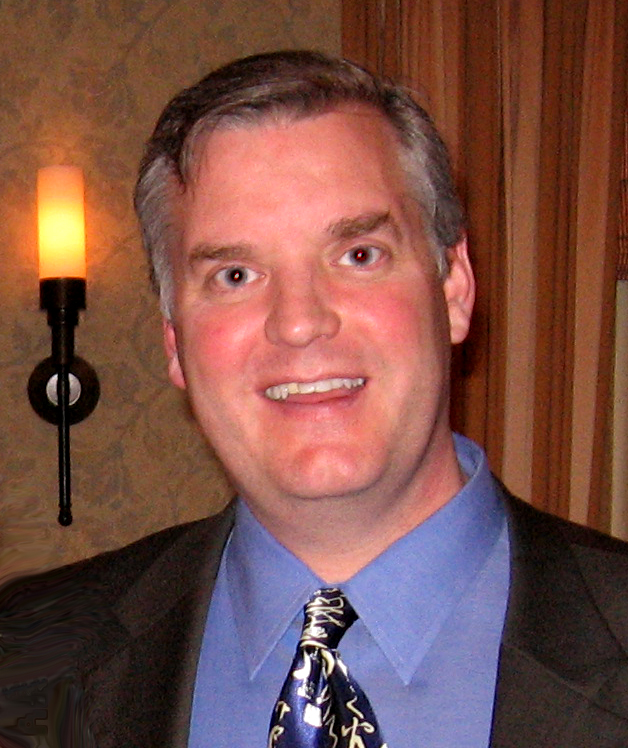
Nominee	Gary Herbert	Peter Corroon
Party	Republican	Democratic
Running mate	Greg Bell	Sheryl Allen
Popular vote	412,151	205,246
Percentage	64.1%	31.9%
- County results
Governor before election
Gary Herbert
Republican
Elected Governor
Gary Herbert
Republican

Governor Jon Huntsman, Jr. was nominated by President Barack Obama and confirmed by the Senate as the United States Ambassador to China. Lt. Governor Gary Herbert became governor on August 11, 2009. Utah law requires that a special election be held in 2010 to fill the remainder of the term, which expired on January 7, 2013. Herbert sought election and won the general election in this conservative state.

The Democratic nominee was Salt Lake County Mayor Peter Corroon, who won his party's nomination unopposed at the Democratic Party Convention.

Utah special election
Party	Candidate	Votes	%
Republican	Gary Herbert (incumbent)	412,151	64.07
Democratic	Peter Corroon	205,246	31.90
Independent	Farley Anderson	13,038	2.03
Libertarian	W. Andrew McCullough	12,871	2.00
Total votes		643,306	100.00
Republican hold			

== Vermont ==
Vermont gubernatorial election
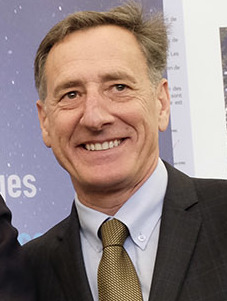

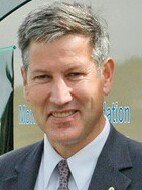
Nominee	Peter Shumlin	Brian Dubie
Party	Democratic	Republican
Electoral vote	145	28
Popular vote	119,543	115,212
Percentage	49.4%	47.7%
- County results
Governor before election
Jim Douglas
Republican
Elected Governor
Peter Shumlin
Democratic

Governor Jim Douglas retired rather than seeking a fifth two-year term in 2010. (The governors of Vermont and New Hampshire serve two-year terms.) Douglas was re-elected in 2008 with 53% of the vote. Republican Lieutenant Governor Brian Dubie announced his candidacy. Former State Auditor and current State Senator Randy Brock, who is African-American, was rumored as a possible Republican candidate.

Peter Shumlin won the Democratic primary according to the uncertified tabulation of statewide votes released by the Office of the Secretary of State on August 27, 2010, by 197 votes over Doug Racine, who requested a recount.

Vermont election
Party	Candidate	Votes	%
Democratic	Peter Shumlin	119,543	49.44
Republican	Brian Dubie	115,212	47.69
Independent	Dennis Steele	1,917	0.79
Marijuana	Cris Ericson	1,819	0.75
Independent	Dan Feliciano	1,341	0.56
Independent	Emily Peyton	684	0.28
Liberty Union	Ben Mitchell	429	0.18
Write-in		660	0.27
Total votes		241,605	100.00
Democratic gain from Republican			

== Wisconsin ==
Wisconsin gubernatorial election
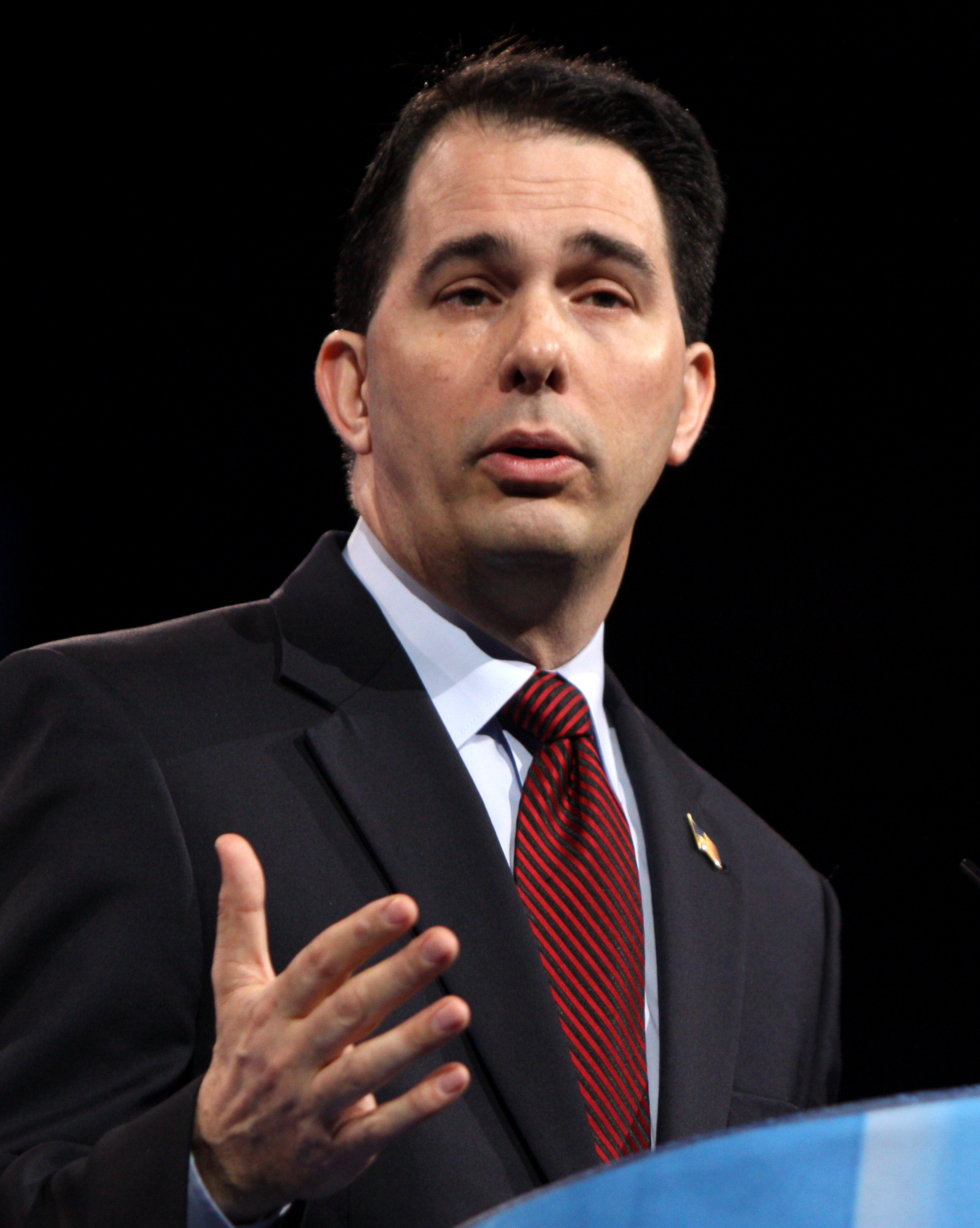

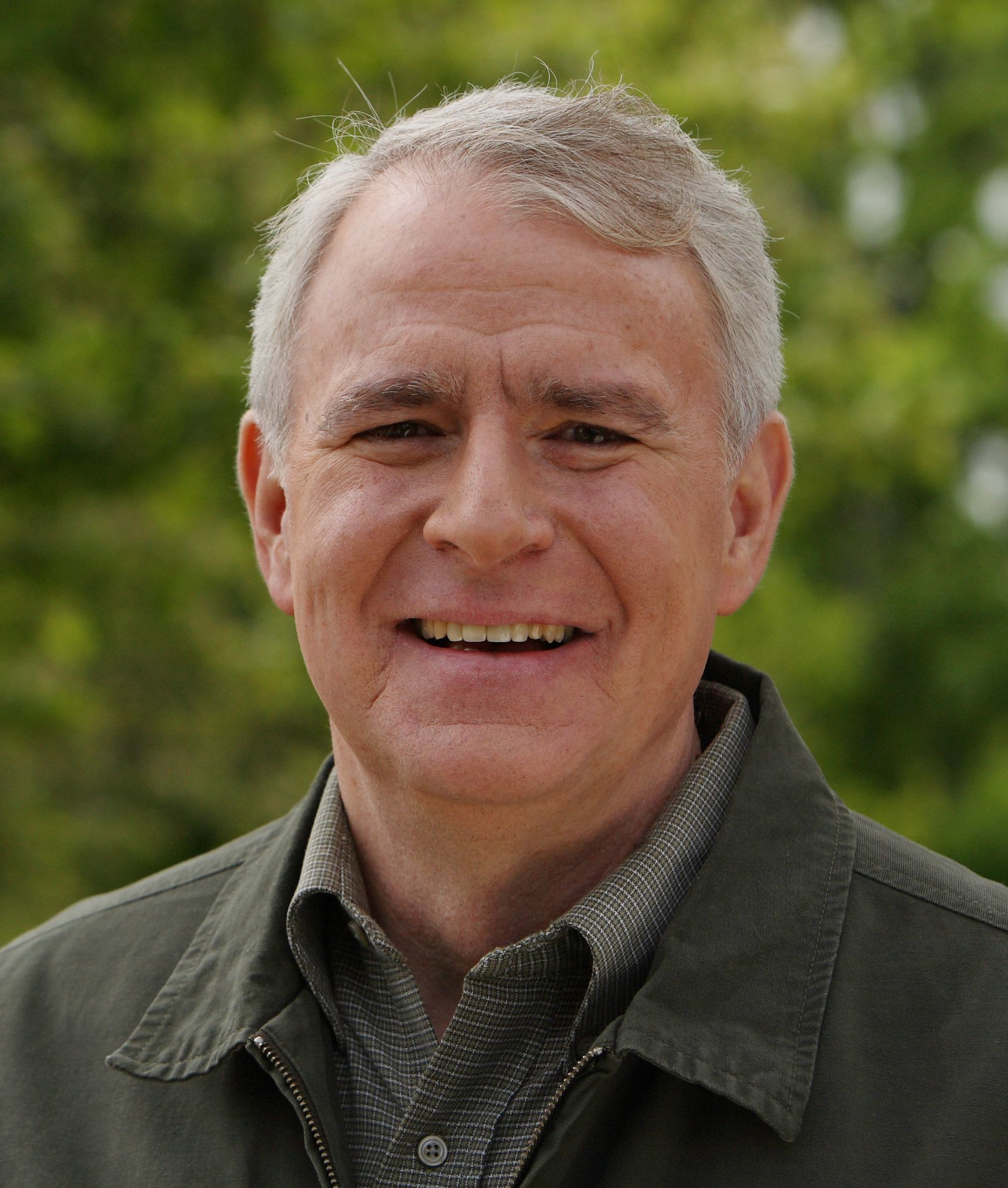
Nominee	Scott Walker	Tom Barrett
Party	Republican	Democratic
Running mate	Rebecca Kleefisch	Tom Nelson
Popular vote	1,128,941	1,004,303
Percentage	52.3%	46.5%
- County results
Governor before election
Jim Doyle
Democratic
Elected Governor
Scott Walker
Republican

Governor Jim Doyle retired rather than seek re-election. He was re-elected with 53% of the vote in 2006. The resignation of his legal counsel as well as dipping poll numbers may have contributed to his decision to not seek re-election.

Democratic Lt. Governor Barbara Lawton said in a statement on October 26, 2009, that she would not seek the Democratic nomination for governor. Milwaukee mayor Tom Barrett and Jared Gary Christiansen both filed to run as Democrats.

On April 28, 2009, Milwaukee County Executive Scott Walker announced that he would seek the Republican nomination for governor. Former Congressman Mark Neumann indicated that he too would enter the Republican primary by the fall of 2009. A third candidate, Appleton businessman Mark Todd, filed as well.

Raymond L. Ertl ran as an independent. He ran a grassroots campaign, and was based out of Milwaukee's East Side.

On November 2, 2010, in the general election, Republican Scott Walker defeated Democrat Tom Barrett to become the 45th governor of Wisconsin.

Wisconsin election
Party	Candidate	Votes	%
Republican	Scott Walker	1,128,941	52.29
Democratic	Tom Barrett	1,004,303	46.52
Independent	Jim Langer	10,608	0.49
Common Sense	James James	8,273	0.38
Libertarian	Terry Virgil	6,790	0.31
Write-in		59	0.00
Total votes		2,158,974	100.00
Republican gain from Democratic			

== Wyoming ==
Wyoming gubernatorial election
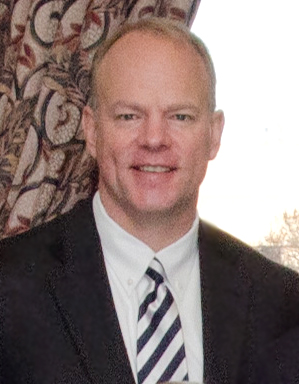

Nominee	Matt Mead	Leslie Petersen	Taylor Haynes
Party	Republican	Democratic	Independent
Popular vote	123,780	43,240	13,796
Percentage	65.7%	22.9%	7.3%
- County results
Governor before election
Dave Freudenthal
Democratic
Elected Governor
Matt Mead
Republican

Governor Dave Freudenthal was term-limited in 2010, but a 2010 Wyoming Supreme Court ruling invalidated legislative term-limits. Freudenthal announced on March 4, 2010, that he would not seek a third term.

Former U.S. Attorney Matt Mead, a Republican, defeated former state Democratic Party Chairwoman Leslie Petersen in a landslide.

Wyoming election
Party	Candidate	Votes	%
Republican	Matt Mead	123,780	65.68
Democratic	Leslie Petersen	43,240	22.94
Independent	Taylor Haynes	13,796	7.32
Libertarian	Mike Wheeler	5,362	2.85
Write-in		2,285	1.21
Total votes		190,822	100.00
Republican gain from Democratic			

== Territories ==
=== Guam ===
Guam gubernatorial election
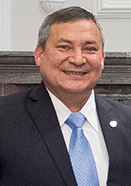

Nominee	Eddie Calvo	Carl Gutierrez
Party	Republican	Democratic
Running mate	Ray Tenorio	Frank Aguon
Popular vote	20,066	19,579
Percentage	50.6%	49.4%
- Village results
Governor before election
Felix Perez Camacho
Republican
Elected Governor
Eddie Calvo
Republican

Governor Felix Camacho was term-limited in 2010. Lieutenant Governor Michael W. Cruz, a surgeon and veteran of the Gulf War and Iraq War, ran for the Republican nomination against Senator Eddie B. Calvo. On the Democratic side, former governor Carl Gutierrez announced that he would run. Attorney Mike Phillips was considered a bid for the governorship.

Guam election
Party	Candidate	Votes	%
Republican	Eddie Baza Calvo	20,066	50.61
Democratic	Carl Gutierrez	19,579	49.39
Total votes		39,645	100.00
Republican hold			

=== U.S. Virgin Islands ===
U.S. Virgin Islands gubernatorial election
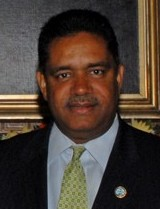

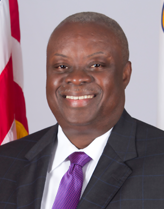
Nominee	John de Jongh	Kenneth Mapp
Party	Democratic	Independent
Running mate	Gregory Francis	Malik Sekou
Popular vote	17,535	13,580
Percentage	56.3%	43.6%
Governor before election
John de Jongh
Democratic
Elected Governor
John de Jongh
Democratic

Incumbent Governor John de Jongh sought re-election for a second term in 2010. He was elected with 57% of the vote (in a runoff) in 2006 over Kenneth Mapp.

On September 11, 2010, Governor John de Jongh won the Democratic primary election with 53% of the vote. De Jongh defeated Senator Adlah Donastorg, former Lt. Governor Gerard Luz James and James O'Bryan Jr. with more votes than all three of his Democratic challengers combined.

De Jongh faced independent candidate Kenneth Mapp, a former Lieutenant Governor of the United States Virgin Islands, in the general election on November 2, 2010.

De Jongh defeated Mapp in the election.

United States Virgin Islands election
Party	Candidate	Votes	%
Democratic	John de Jongh Jr. (incumbent)	17,535	56.27
Independent	Kenneth Mapp	13,580	43.58
Total votes		31,115	100.00
Democratic hold			

== See also ==
- 2010 United States elections
  - 2010 United States Senate elections
  - 2010 United States House of Representatives elections
