= Bob Haukoos =

American politician

Member of the Minnesota House of Representatives from the 27A district 31A (1979-1993)
- In office January 3, 1979 – January 3, 1995
- Preceded by: Henry J. Savelkoul
- Succeeded by: Ron Kraus

Personal details
- Born: June 21, 1931 Walters, Minnesota
- Died: September 10, 2011 (aged 80) Albert Lea, Minnesota
- Party: Republican Party of Minnesota
- Spouse: Grace
- Children: 2
- Profession: legislator

Military service
- Allegiance: United States of America
- Branch/service: United States Navy
- Years of service: 1950–1953
- Battles/wars: Korean War

Melvin Robert (Bob) Haukoos (June 21, 1931 – September 10, 2011) was a Minnesota politician and was a member of the Minnesota House of Representatives from 1979-1995. Haukoos, a Republican, who represented District 27A, which included all or portions of Freeborn and Mower counties in the southeastern part of the state. Haukoos also served as the mayor of Albert Lea, Minnesota from 2001-2002.

== Early life, education, and career ==
Born in Walters, Minnesota to Russell and Emma Hauskins Haukoos, Haukoos attended Kiester-Walters Public Schools. He enlisted in the Naval Reserve and was called to active duty in 1950. During the Korean War, he served on the flight decks of the aircraft carriers USS Antietam and the USS Oriskany operating off the coast of Korea. After the war he became a firefighter for the Albert Lea, Minnesota Fire Department. He served on the fire department for 21 1/2 years, retiring as captain of the blue shift.

== Minnesota House of Representatives ==
=== Elections ===
Haukoos was first elected to the House on November 7, 1978, he was re-elected in 1980, 1982, 1984, 1986, 1988, 1990, and 1992. In 1994 he decided to retire from the legislature.

1992 Minnesota State Representative- House 27A
Party	Candidate	Votes	%	±%
Democratic (DFL)	John Severtson	7134	39.69	
Republican	'Bob Haukoos	10281	57.20	

1990 Minnesota State Representative- House 31A
Party	Candidate	Votes	%	±%
Democratic (DFL)	John Severtson	3796	33.38	
Republican	'Bob Haukoos	7127	62.68	

1988 Minnesota State Representative- House 31A
Party	Candidate	Votes	%	±%
Democratic (DFL)	Colin "Coke" Minehart	4940	36.22	
Republican	'Bob Haukoos	8699	63.78	

1986 Minnesota State Representative- House 31A
Party	Candidate	Votes	%	±%
Democratic (DFL)	Colin "Coke" Minehart	3900	37.90	
Republican	'Bob Haukoos	5987	58.10	

1984 Minnesota State Representative- House 31A
Party	Candidate	Votes	%	±%
Democratic (DFL)	Arnold L. Hanson	5302	35.10	
Republican	'Bob Haukoos	8703	57.60	

1982 Minnesota State Representative- House 31A
Party	Candidate	Votes	%	±%
Democratic (DFL)	Elaine Wenz	4092	30.66	
Republican	'Bob Haukoos	8519	63.82	

1980 Minnesota State Representative- House 31A
Party	Candidate	Votes	%	±%
Democratic (DFL)	Colin "Coke" Minehart	3969	35.30	
Republican	'Bob Haukoos	7267	65.60	

1978 Minnesota State Representative- House 31A
Party	Candidate	Votes	%	±%
Democratic (DFL)	Chuck Carpenter	3506	35.60	
Republican	'Bob Haukoos	6352	64.40	

=== Committee assignments ===
For the 78th Legislative Session, Haukoos was part of the:

- Commerce and Economic Development Committee
- Commerce and Economic Development Subcommittee: International Trade, Technology and Economic Development Division
- Commerce and Economic Development Subcommittee: Occupational Licensing
- General Legislation, Veterans Affairs, and Elections Committee
- Governmental Operations and Gambling Committee
- Governmental Operations and Gambling Subcommittee: Gambling
- Governmental Operations and Gambling Subcommittee: State Government Finance Division

For the 77th Legislative Session, Haukoos was part of the:

- Appropriations Committee
- Appropriations Subcommittee: Education Division
- Financial Institutions and Insurance Committee
- Financial Institutions and Insurance Subcommittee: Banking Division
- Redistricting Committee
- Regulated Industries Committee

For the 76th Legislative Session, Haukoos was part of the:

- Governmental Operations Committee
- Governmental Operations Subcommittee: Government Structures
- Insurance Committee
- Local Government and Metropolitan Affairs Committee
- Local Government and Metropolitan Affairs Subcommittee: Local Government and Structures
- Regulated Industries Committee

For the 75th Legislative Session, Haukoos was part of the:

- Appropriations Committee
- Appropriations Subcommittee: Education Division
- Future and Technology Committee
- Future and Technology Subcommittee: Futurist
- Future and Technology Subcommittee: Software
- Local and Urban Affairs Committee
- Transportation Committee
- Transportation Subcommittee: Safety

For the 74th Legislative Session, Haukoos was part of the:

- Appropriations Committee
- Appropriations Subcommittee: Education Division (Chair)
- Financial Institutions and Insurance Committee
- Local and Urban Affairs Committee
- Local and Urban Affairs Subcommittee: Local Government Affairs

For the 73rd Legislative Session, Haukoos was part of the:

- Appropriations Committee
- Appropriations Subcommittee: Education Division
- Financial Institutions and Insurance Committee
- Financial Institutions and Insurance Subcommittee: Insurance
- Local and Urban Affairs Committee
- Local and Urban Affairs Subcommittee: Physical and Economic Development

For the 72nd Legislative Session, Haukoos was part of the:

- Appropriations Committee
- Appropriations Subcommittee: Education Division
- Local and Urban Affairs Committee
- Local and Urban Affairs Subcommittee: Physical Development
- Reapportionment and Elections Committee
- Reapportionment and Elections Subcommittee: Election Laws

For the 71st Legislative Session, Haukoos was part of the:

- Appropriations Committee
- Appropriations Subcommittee: Education Division
- General Legislation and Veterans Affairs Committee
- General Legislation and Veterans Affairs Subcommittee: Elections and Campaign Practices

=== Tenure ===
Haukoos was first sworn in on January 3, 1979, serving until January 3, 1995. He served in the 71st, 72nd, 73rd, 74th, 75th, 76th, 77th, and 78th Minnesota Legislatures. In 1990, Haukoos was a co-sponsor of a legislative bill renaming Helmer Myre State Park based on Albert Lea Lake as Myre-Big Island State Park. Haukoos helped pass a law on Airplane Frequent Flyer Benefits that makes the frequent-flyer miles accrued belong to the purchaser of the ticket, which, in some cases, is the state or other governmental unit. As fiscal conservative, Haukoos opposed the state increasing staffing at rest areas. Instead, He sponsored a bill that allowed the state to take bids on installing the kiosks containing both information for travelers and advertising. The company would sell the ad space and the state would receive part of the revenue. In the 76th Legislative Session, Haukoos strongly opposed a proposal to allow only video gambling in bars and restaurants and eliminate paper pulltabs because it could have caused job layoffs for a local Albert Lea company that produces paper pulltabs.

== Post-legislative career ==
After the Legislature he worked as field representative for 1st District U.S. Representative Gil Gutknecht and enjoyed camaraderie with former colleagues during a term as Master at Arms for the Minnesota House of Representatives. Haukoos served a term as mayor of Albert Lea during 2001-2002. During his term as Mayor, the meat-packaging plant Farmstead caught fire and burned down. After almost 15 years, the city has yet to do anything with the land.

== Personal life ==
Haukoos married his wife Grace McNeil on July 28, 1955 and lived in Albert Lea, Minnesota. Haukoos and his wife had 2 children: Miriam and Robert and had 3 grandchildren from Robert. He was a dedicated and faithful public servant, giving his time and energy to many public causes. For 20 years he was a member of the board of the American Lung Association of Minnesota. At various times he served on the boards of Naeve Hospital, the National Guard Advisory Committee, the Chamber of Commerce Foundation, the City of Albert Lea Housing and Redevelopment Authority and numerous other organizations. He was a long time member of Golden Kiwanis, the VFW, the American Legion and the Sons of Norway. For more than 50 years, Haukoos was an active member of the First Baptist Church, including service as treasurer, usher, and member of the Board of Deacons. Haukoos is also related to former Minnesota Congressman Tim Penny.

== Death ==
Haukoos died at his home in Albert Lea, Minnesota on the morning of September 10, 2011, after dealing with congestive heart disease for many years. His funeral was held at the First Baptist Church in Albert Lea, Minnesota. He was buried in Graceland Cemetery.

Minnesota House of Representatives
Preceded by Henry Savelkoul	Member of the Minnesota House of Representatives from District 27A; 31st (1987–1993); 1979–1995	Succeeded by Ron Kraus
