= Roger Moe =

American politician (born 1944)

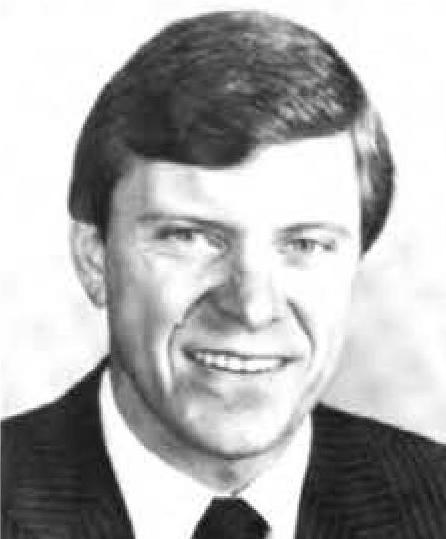
- Moe in 1985

Majority Leader of the Minnesota Senate
- In office January 5, 1981 – January 7, 2003
- Preceded by: Nick Coleman
- Succeeded by: John Hottinger

Member of the Minnesota Senate from the 2nd district
- In office January 2, 1973 – January 7, 2003
- Preceded by: Roger Laufenburger
- Succeeded by: Rod Skoe

Member of the Minnesota Senate from the 66th district
- In office January 5, 1971 – January 2, 1973
- Preceded by: Norman J. Larson
- Succeeded by: John C. Chenoweth

Personal details
- Born: June 2, 1944 (age 82) Crookston, Minnesota, U.S.
- Party: Democratic
- Spouse: Paulette
- Children: 4
- Education: Mayville State University (BS)

Roger D. Moe (born June 2, 1944) is an American politician who served as a member and majority leader of the Minnesota Senate. He was the Democratic nominee for governor in the 2002 Minnesota gubernatorial election.

== Early life and education ==
Born in Crookston, Moe graduated from Crookston Central High School and received his college degree from Mayville State College in North Dakota. His graduate studies were completed at Moorhead State University and North Dakota State University in Fargo. In 2005, he received an Honorary LL.D from the University of Minnesota.

== Career ==
Before running for office, he taught math and coached wrestling at Ada High School in Ada, Minnesota.

=== Politics ===
Moe was elected to the Senate in 1970, and was the second-youngest senator in state history at the time. He represented the old District 66 during the 1971–72 biennium and, after the 1972 legislative redistricting, District 2 for the remainder of his time in office. Through the years, he represented all or parts of Becker, Beltrami, Clay, Clearwater, Mahnomen, Norman, Polk and Red Lake counties in the northwestern part of the state.

Moe became the Senate's majority leader in 1981, a position he held for 22 years. He is the longest-serving state majority leader, and the longest-serving leader of either of Minnesota's legislative bodies. His brother, Donald Moe, was also a member of the legislature, serving in both the House and Senate.

Moe sponsored an initiative to transfer lottery proceeds to Minnesota environmental projects (Legislative Commission on Minnesota Resources – LCMR), the creation of the Minnesota State Colleges and Universities governance system, the Midwestern Higher Education Compact, and the Environmental Trust Fund.

Moe ran for the U.S. Senate in 1994, but did not win the DFL nomination. In 1998, he ran for lieutenant governor as DFL gubernatorial nominee Skip Humphrey's running mate. In 2002, Moe ran for governor against Tim Pawlenty, Tim Penny, and Ken Pentel. Moe and his running mate, Julie Sabo, won the DFL nomination, but lost the general election to Pawlenty.

=== Later career ===
Moe has retired from public office. He is a business consultant and lobbyist, and serves on several state and national nonprofit boards, and on the Minnesota Job Skills Partnership Board.

== Electoral history ==
- 2002 Race for Governor
  - Tim Pawlenty (R), 44%
  - Roger Moe (DFL), 36%
  - Tim Penny (IPM), 16%
  - Ken Pentel (Grn), 2%

Minnesota Senate
| Preceded by Norman J. Larson | Member of the Minnesota Senate from the 66th district 1971–1973 | Succeeded by John C. Chenoweth |
| Preceded by Roger Laufenburger | Member of the Minnesota Senate from the 2nd district 1973–2003 | Succeeded by Rod Skoe |
| Preceded by Nick Coleman | Majority Leader of the Minnesota Senate; 1981–2003 | Succeeded by John Hottinger |
Party political offices
| Preceded by Nancy Larson | DFL nominee for Lieutenant Governor of Minnesota; 1998 | Succeeded by Julie Sabo |
| Preceded by Skip Humphrey | DFL nominee for Governor of Minnesota; 2002 | Succeeded by Mike Hatch |
