= 2002 Minnesota gubernatorial election =

- November 5, 2002
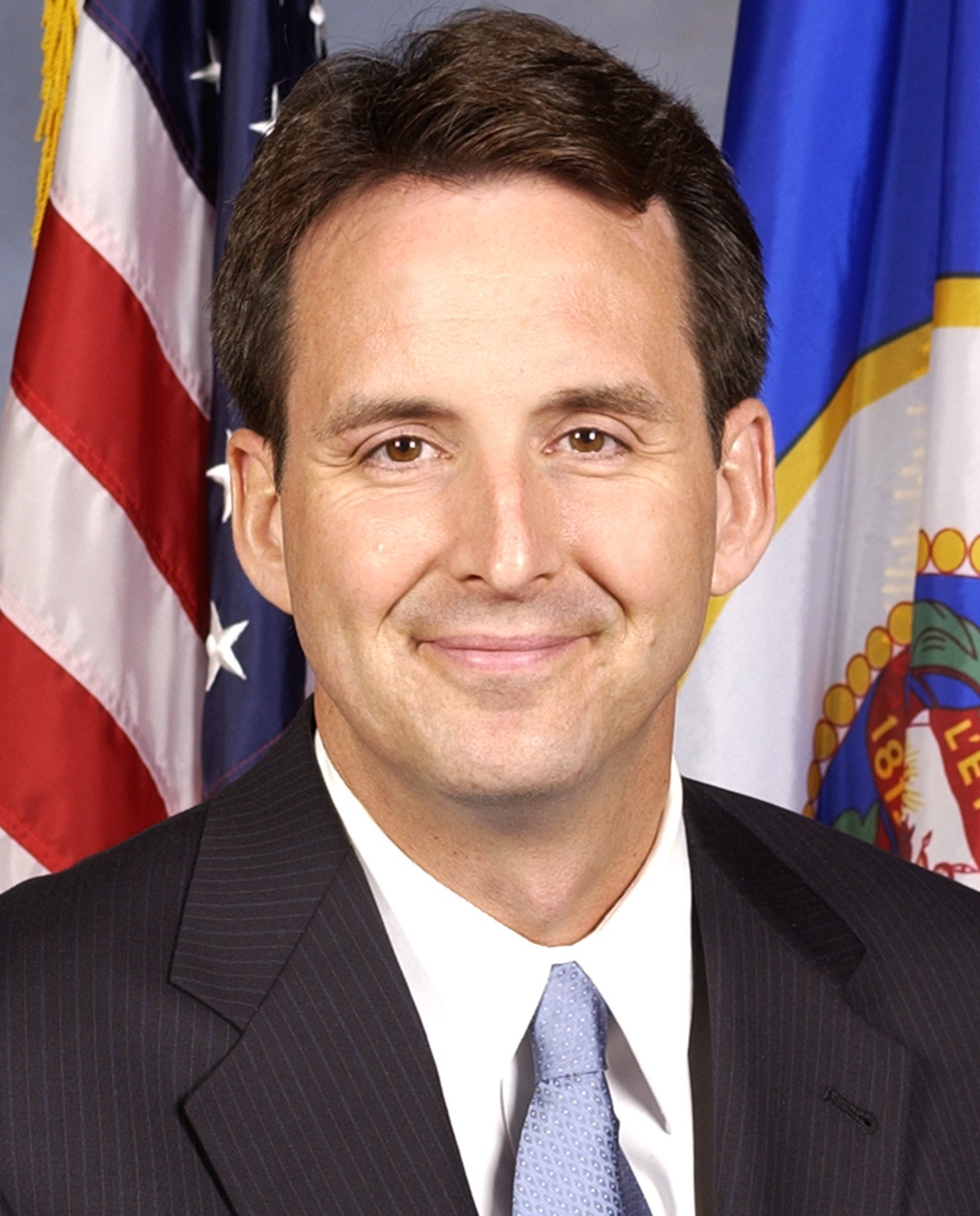

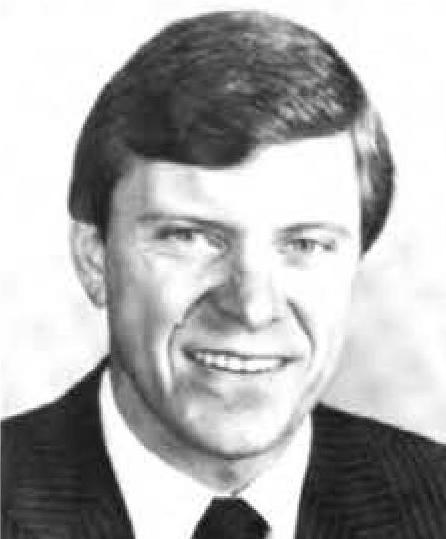

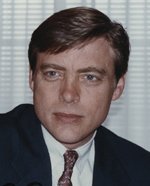
Nominee	Tim Pawlenty	Roger Moe	Tim Penny
Party	Republican	Democratic (DFL)	Independence
Running mate	Carol Molnau	Julie Sabo	Martha Robertson
Popular vote	999,473	821,268	364,534
Percentage	44.37%	36.46%	16.18%
- Pawlenty: 30–40% 40–50% 50–60% 60–70% 70–80% 80–90% >90% Moe: 30–40% 40–50% 50–60% 60–70% 70–80% 80–90% >90% Penny: 30–40% 40–50% 50–60% 60–70% 70–80% 80–90% >90% Tie: 20–30% 30–40% 40–50% 50%
Governor before election
Jesse Ventura
Independence
Elected Governor
Tim Pawlenty
Republican

The 2002 Minnesota gubernatorial election took place on November 5, 2002 for the post of governor of Minnesota. Governor Jesse Ventura chose not to seek re-election to a second term in office. Republican state representative Tim Pawlenty defeated Democratic state senator Roger Moe and Independence Party candidate Tim Penny. Pawlenty comfortably won the election, which was attributed in part to Moe's uninspired campaign; Moe would be dubbed a "cautious dullard" four years later by the City Pages.

== Republican primary ==
=== Candidates ===
- Leslie Davis, 1994 Minneapolis mayoral candidate
- Tim Pawlenty, Minnesota House of Representatives majority leader

=== Results ===
2002 Republican gubernatorial primary election
Party	Candidate	Votes	%
Republican	Tim Pawlenty	172,927	88.64
Republican	Leslie Davis	22,172	11.36
Total votes		195,099	100.00

== DFL primary ==
In May 2002, the DFL formally endorsed Moe over rival Judi Dutcher, the Minnesota state auditor. Becky Lourey, a member of the Minnesota Senate, was also a contender before dropping out.

=== Candidates ===
- Roger Moe, Minnesota Senate majority leader
- Oloveuse S. "Ole" Savior, artist and perennial candidate

==== Withdrew ====
- Judi Dutcher, Minnesota state auditor (following defeat at convention)
- Becky Lourey, state senator from Kerrick

=== Results ===
2002 Democratic–Farmer–Labor gubernatorial primary election
Party	Candidate	Votes	%
Democratic (DFL)	Roger Moe	199,103	88.79
Democratic (DFL)	Ole Savior	25,135	11.21
Total votes		224,238	100.00

== General election ==
=== Candidates ===
- Lawrence Aeshliman (Constitution)
- Booker Hodges IV (Independent)
- Roger Moe, Minnesota Senate majority leader (Democratic)
  - Running mate: Julie Sabo, state senator from Minneapolis and daughter of Martin Olav Sabo
- Tim Pawlenty, Minnesota House of Representatives majority leader (Republican)
  - Running mate: Carol Molnau, state representative from Chaska
- Tim Penny, former U.S. representative from New Richland (Independence)
  - Running mate: Martha Robertson
- Ken Pentel (Green)
- Kari Sachs (Socialist Workers)

=== Polling ===
Polls indicated a dead heat between Penny, Moe, and Pawlenty less than a month before the election. A poll by the Star Tribune had Moe and Penny tied at 27%, and Pawlenty ahead with 29%.

=== Debates ===
2002 Minnesota gubernatorial election debates
No.	Date	Host	Moderator	Link	Republican	Democratic	Independence	Green
Key: P Participant A Absent N Not invited I Invited W Withdrawn								
Key: P Participant A Absent N Not invited I Invited W Withdrawn					Tim Pawlenty	Roger Moe	Tim Penny	Ken Pentel
1	Jul. 31, 2002	Twin Cities PBS	Eric Eskola; Cathy Wurzer	C-SPAN	P	P	P	P
2	Nov. 1, 2002	Twin Cities PBS	Eric Eskola; Cathy Wurzer	C-SPAN	P	P	P	P

=== Predictions ===
Source	Ranking	As of
The Cook Political Report	Tossup	October 31, 2002
Sabato's Crystal Ball	Lean R (flip)	November 4, 2002

=== Results ===
County flips: Democratic Hold Flip / Republican Hold Flip / Independence Flip

2002 gubernatorial election, Minnesota
Party	Candidate	Votes	%	±%
Republican	Tim Pawlenty	999,473	44.37%	+10.1%
Democratic (DFL)	Roger Moe	821,268	36.46%	+6.4%
Independence	Tim Penny	364,534	16.18%	−20.8%
Green	Ken Pentel	50,589	2.25%	+2.0%
Independent	Booker Hodges IV	9,698	0.43%	+0.4%
Socialist Workers	Kari Sachs	3,026	0.14%	+0.09%
Constitution	Lawrence Aeshliman	2,537	0.11%	+0.1%
	Lealand Vettleson	2	0.00%	+0.0%
	Write-ins	1,348	0.06%	+0.02%
Majority		178,205	7.91%	
Turnout		2,252,473	70.7%	+10.6%
Republican gain from Independence				

Counties that flipped from Reform to Republican

- Benton (largest city: Sauk Rapids)
- Blue Earth (largest city: Mankato)
- Chisago (largest city: North Branch)
- Scott (largest city: Shakopee)
- Dakota (largest city: Hastings)
- Goodhue (largest city: Red Wing)
- Grant (largest city: Elbow Lake)
- Isanti (largest city: Cambridge)
- Kanabec (largest city: Mora)
- Kandiyohi (largest city: Willmar)
- Le Sueur (largest city: Le Sueur)
- McLeod (largest city: Hutchinson)
- Meeker (largest city: Litchfield)
- Mille Lacs (largest city: Princeton)
- Nicollet (largest city: North Mankato)
- Pope (largest city: Glenwood)
- Renville (largest city: Olivia)
- Sherburne (largest city: Elk River)
- Sibley (largest city: Gaylord)
- Stearns (largest city: St. Cloud)
- Steele (largest city: Owatonna)
- Wabasha (largest city: Lake City)
- Washington (largest city: Stillwater)
- Watonwan (largest city: St. James)
- Wright (largest city: Otsego)
- Aitkin (largest city: Aitkin)
- Pine (largest city: Pine City)
- Rice (largest city: Faribault)
- Anoka (largest city: Blaine)
- Carver (largest city: Chaska)

Counties that flipped from Reform to Democratic

- Yellow Medicine (largest city: Granite Falls)
- Chippewa (largest city: Montevideo)
- Hennepin (largest city: Minneapolis)
- Ramsey (largest city: St. Paul)
- Swift (largest city: Benson)

Counties that flipped from Republican to Democratic

- Beltrami (largest city: Bemidji)
- Koochiching (largest city: International Falls)
- Clearwater (largest city: Bagley)
- Traverse (largest city: Wheaton)
- Mahnomen (largest city: Mahnomen)

Counties that flipped from Republican to Independence

- Olmsted (largest city: Rochester)
- Fillmore (largest city: Spring Valley)
- Freeborn (largest city: Albert Lea)
- Dodge (largest city: Kasson)
- Faribault (largest city: Blue Earth)
- Waseca (largest city: Waseca)

Counties that flipped from Democratic to Independence

- Mower (largest city: Austin)

== See also ==
- List of Minnesota gubernatorial elections
