= Ron Kraus =

American politician

Member of the Minnesota House of Representatives from the 27A district
- In office January 3, 1995 – January 5, 1999
- Preceded by: Bob Haukoos
- Succeeded by: Dan Dorman

Personal details
- Born: May 13, 1956 (age 70) Waltham, Minnesota
- Party: Republican Party of Minnesota
- Spouse: Kathy
- Children: 2
- Education: Minnesota State University, Mankato; Saint Mary's College; University of Minnesota Duluth
- Profession: Business owner, legislator

Ronald (Ron) Edward Kraus (born May 13, 1956) is a Minnesota politician and was a member of the Minnesota House of Representatives from 1995 to 1999. Kraus, a Republican, who represented District 27A, which included all of Freeborn county in the southeastern part of the state.

== Early life and family ==
Born in Waltham, Minnesota to Edward James Kraus (1926-1959) and Vivian Hoffman Kraus Zimmerman. His father died when Ron was only 3 years old on July 30, 1959. His mother remarried when Ron was 6 in 1962 to James (Jim) E. Zimmerman (1923-2015), a widower who had lost his wife and 6 kids in a train accident in 1959. Ron has 5 siblings: Joan, James, Steven, Richard, and Thomas. He has 3 half-siblings: Peter, Paul and Mariia.

== Education and career ==
Kraus attended Mankato State University, Saint Mary's College, and University of Minnesota Duluth where he studied business and political science. In 1981 Kraus founded Kraus Petroleum. He bought his first Dairy Queen in 1988. Kraus changed the name of his business to Kraus Foods. Kraus served as Chair of the Albert Lea/Freeborn County Chamber of Commerce. Kraus also served on the Albert Lea Planning Commission and the Community Foundation Board. Kraus became a successful business owner running 41 Dairy Queen restaurants in Minnesota, Iowa, Wisconsin, Florida, and Alabama, and six Convenience Stores called Korner Mart in Albert Lea, Minnesota and the surrounding area. In March 2008, Kraus sold 33 of his Dairy Queen restaurants to Bloomington, Minnesota-based Fourteen Foods. Kraus retained ownership of the remaining Dairy Queens in Florida. In April 2008, Kraus sold 2 Korner Mart Stores to a long-time employee of Kraus Foods, Kevin Weitzel. Kraus relocated the Headquarters of Kraus Foods from Albert Lea to Fort Myers, Florida.

== Minnesota House of Representatives ==
=== Elections ===
Kraus was first elected to the House on November 8, 1994, he was re-elected in 1996. In 1998 he decided not to run for a 3rd term wanting to return to his business and family full time.

1996 Minnesota State Representative- House 27A
Party	Candidate	Votes	%	±%
Democratic (DFL)	Gerald C. Skaar	6352	39.29	
Republican	Ron Kraus	9534	58.98	

1994 Minnesota State Representative- House 27A
Party	Candidate	Votes	%	±%
Democratic (DFL)	James (Jim) E. Bye	6607	48.32	
Republican	Ron Kraus	6873	50.27	

=== Committee assignments ===
For the 80th Legislative Session, Karus was part of the:

- Agriculture Committee
- Local Government and Metropolitan Affairs Committee
- Taxes Committee
- Property Tax and Tax Increment Financing Division Subcommittee

For the 79th Legislative Session, Kraus was part of the:

- Agriculture
- Agriculture Finance and Rural Development Subcommittee
- Commerce, Tourism and Consumer Affairs
- Real Estate and Commerce Subcommittee
- Education
- University of Minnesota Finance Division Subcommittee.

=== Tenure ===
Kraus was first sworn in on January 3, 1995, serving until January 4, 1999. He served in the 79th and 80th Minnesota Legislatures. He served all 4 years in the minority caucus. Successful legislation Kraus carried includes a law that requires school superintendent candidates to tell the hiring school board if they had ever been bought out of a previous job contract. He also was able to get $800,000 for the Blazing Star Trail, $250,000 for Albert Lea schools to develop a unique kindergarten and first-grade pilot program, and a $250,000 "Mighty Ducks" grant for a second ice sheet in Albert Lea, MN. Kraus helped obtain state funding for a new ethanol plant in Glenville, MN, a community in his district. He also worked hard to reduce commercial and industrial property tax rates.

== Personal life ==
Kraus is married to his wife, Kathy. They have 2 kids, Chad(b. 1981) and John(b. 1983). They formerly resided in Albert Lea, Minnesota At the time of his step-father's death in 2015, Kraus currently resides in Fort Myers, Florida. Kraus, like his step-father was a member of the Knights of Columbus. He attended St. Theodore's Catholic Church in Albert Lea. Kraus was also a member of the Albert Lea Elks Club.

Minnesota House of Representatives
Preceded by Bob Haukoos	Member of the House of Representatives from District 27A; 1995–1999	Succeeded by Dan Dorman
