= Nick Ronnenberg =

American politician

Mark Streimer

Member-elect of the Minnesota House of Representatives from the 23A district
- Assuming office January 12, 2027
- Succeeding: Peggy Bennett

Personal details
- Party: Republican
- Website: www.ronnenbergformn.com

Nick Ronnenberg is an American politician who is the representative-elect for district 23A in the Minnesota House of Representatives. A member of the Minnesota Republican Party, he was elected in 2026. Ronnenberg is a veteran of the United States Army.
