= Rich Murray (politician) =

American politician

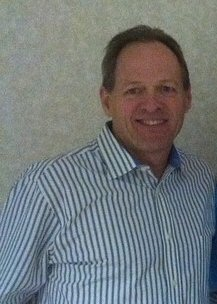

Mayor of Albert Lea
- Incumbent
- Assumed office January 9, 2023
- Preceded by: Vern Rasmussen Jr.

Member of the Minnesota House of Representatives from the 27A district
- In office January 4, 2011 – January 7, 2013
- Preceded by: Robin Brown
- Succeeded by: district redrawn

Personal details
- Born: July 21, 1957 (age 69) Owatonna, Minnesota
- Party: Republican Party of Minnesota
- Spouse: Sandy
- Children: 4
- Education: Mankato State University; University of St. Thomas
- Profession: small business owner, investment advisor, legislator, veteran

Richard J. "Rich" Murray (born July 21, 1957) is a Minnesota politician serving as the mayor of Albert Lea, Minnesota, since 2023. From 2011 to 2013, he served as a member of the Minnesota House of Representatives, representing District 27A, which includes all or parts of Freeborn and Mower Counties.

== Early life, education, and career ==
Murray graduated from Mankato State University, receiving his B.S. in business, and later attended the University of St. Thomas, earning his M.B.A. He also served in the U.S. Army.

Murray is also an investment advisor and small business owner of ISC Financial Advisors, based in Minneapolis and Albert Lea.

== Minnesota House of Representatives ==
=== Elections ===
A Republican, Murray was elected to the House in 2010, unseating incumbent Representative Robin Brown by 57 votes after a recount. In 2012, he lost reelection to DFL nominee Shannon Savick by 653 votes.

2012 Minnesota State Representative- House 27A
| Party | Candidate | Votes | % | ±% |
|---|---|---|---|---|
| Democratic (DFL) | Shannon Savick | 9743 | 47.70 | |
| Republican | Rich Murray (Incumbent) | 9090 | 44.50 | |
| Independence | William J. Wagner | 1574 | 7.71 | |

2010 Minnesota State Representative- House 27A
| Party | Candidate | Votes | % | ±% |
|---|---|---|---|---|
| Democratic (DFL) | Robin Brown (Incumbent) | 7454 | 49.77 | |
| Republican | Rich Murray | 7511 | 50.15 | |

=== Tenure ===
Murray was sworn in on January 4, 2011. He served in the 87th Minnesota legislature. He served on the Government Operations and Elections, the Jobs and Economic Development Finance, the State Government Finance, and the Transportation Policy and Finance committees.

== Personal life ==
Murray is married to his wife, Sandy. They have 4 children and reside in Albert Lea. Active in his community and church through the years, Murray has been a member of the local Salvation Army Board, the Albert Lea Technical College Foundation Board, the Naeve Healthcare Foundation Board, the Southern Minnesota Judicial Ethics Committee, the Circle of Parenting Child Abuse Prevention Board, the local United Way, and local youth athletics and recreation programs.
