= Shannon Savick =

American politician

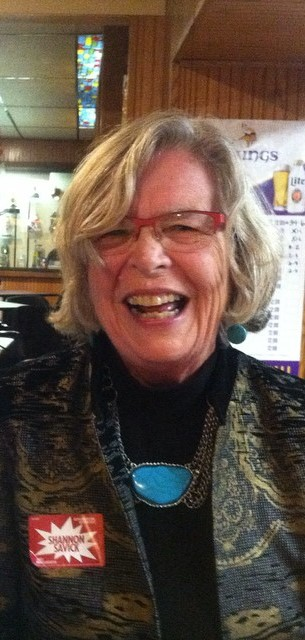

Member of the Minnesota House of Representatives from the 27A district
- In office January 8, 2013 – January 5, 2015
- Preceded by: redrawn district
- Succeeded by: Peggy Bennett

Personal details
- Born: April 12, 1940 (age 86) Bricelyn, Minnesota
- Party: Minnesota Democratic–Farmer–Labor Party
- Spouse: Delmar Phipps
- Children: 1
- Education: Minnesota State University, Mankato (B.S.); Clark University (M.B.A.)
- Occupation: legislator

Shannon Savick (born April 12, 1940) is a Minnesota politician and former member of the Minnesota House of Representatives. A member of the Minnesota Democratic–Farmer–Labor Party (DFL), she represented District 27A in southern Minnesota.

== Early life, education, and career ==
Savick grew up in Bricelyn, Minnesota. She attended Minnesota State University, Mankato, graduating with a B.S. in math and physics. She later attended Clark University, graduating with a M.B.A.

She served on the Wells city council and later as mayor.

== Minnesota House of Representatives ==
=== Elections ===
Savick announced her intention to run for the Minnesota House of Representatives in August 2011 and challenge incumbent Rep. Tony Cornish, but redistricting following the 2012 Census put her in the district represented by Republican Rich Murray. During the campaign Savick prioritized the reinstatement of the market-value homestead tax credit, a greater emphasis in technical skills in public education and protection of the fire safety account. Savick won, defeating incumbent Rich Murray by 653 votes. In 2014, Savick was defeated for re-election by Republican Peggy Bennett by 2,016 votes.

2014 Minnesota State Representative- House 27A
Party	Candidate	Votes	%	±%
Democratic (DFL)	Shannon Savick (Incumbent)	6139	39.93	−7.77
Republican	Peggy Bennett	8155	53.04	
Independence	Thomas Price	1066	6.93	

2012 Minnesota State Representative- House 27A.
Party	Candidate	Votes	%	±%
Democratic (DFL)	Shannon Savick	9743	47.70	
Republican	Rich Murray (Incumbent)	9090	44.50	
Independence	William J. Wagner	1574	7.71	

=== Tenure ===
Savick was sworn in on January 8, 2013. In her first legislative session she focused heavily on volunteer firefighters, securing passage of a bill that reduced the burden from audits on volunteer fire departments and authored a failed bill that would have provided a $500 tax credit for first responders. Savick was also recognized by the League of Greater Minnesota Cities for her work on economic development policy and was awarded their legislative distinction award.

=== Committee assignments ===
For the 2013-14 legislative session, Savick was assigned to the Public Safety Finance and Policy, the Jobs and Economic Development Finance, and the Labor, Workplace and Regulated Industries Committees.

== Personal life ==
Savick is married to her husband, Delmar Phipps. They reside in Wells, Minnesota. She was an advocate for children in foster care, and adopted son Francis (Fran) Martin in 1985 after being his foster parent for three years.
