= Tim Pawlenty =

American politician (born 1960)

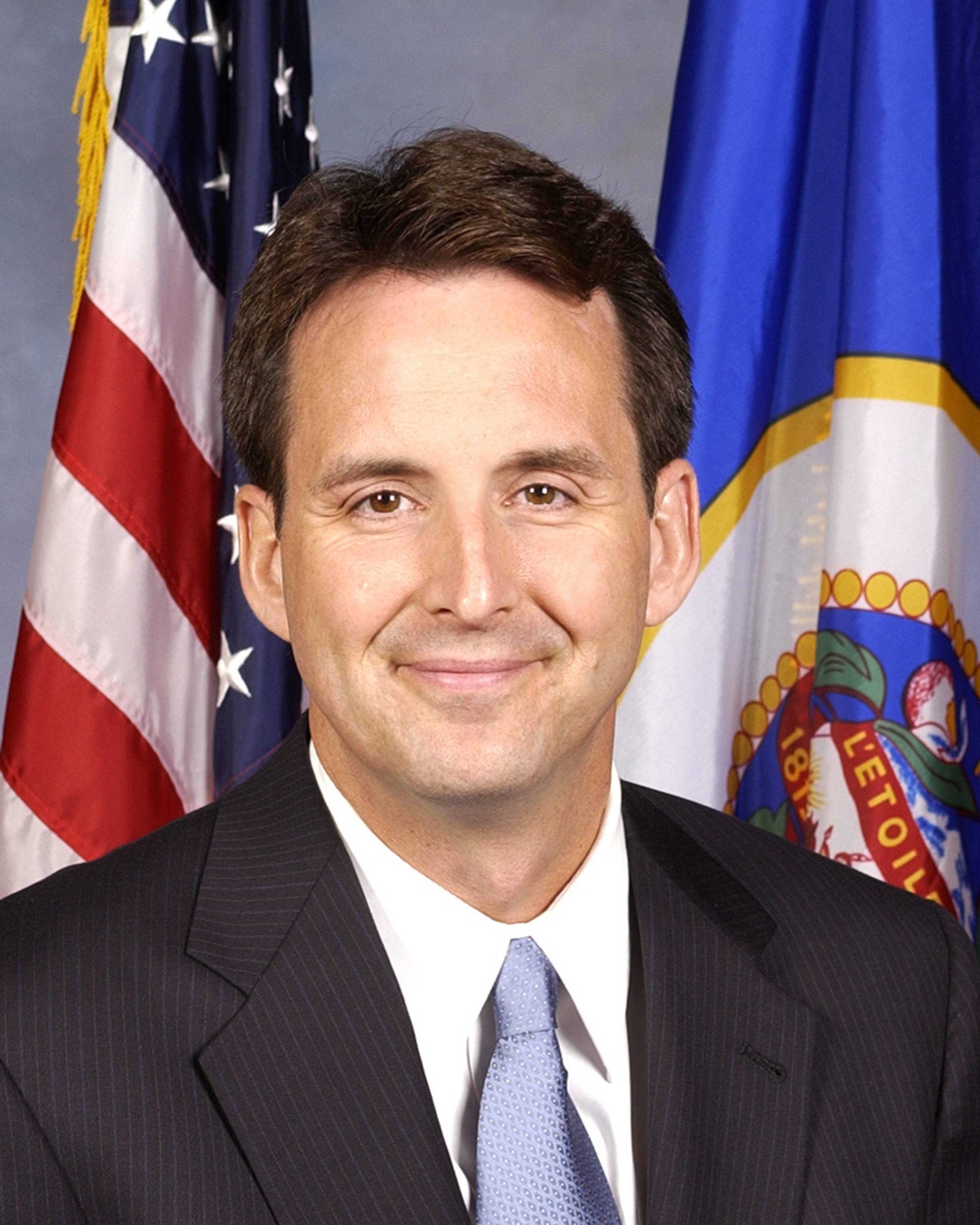
- Official portrait, 2003

39th Governor of Minnesota
- In office January 6, 2003 – January 3, 2011
- Lieutenant: Carol Molnau
- Preceded by: Jesse Ventura
- Succeeded by: Mark Dayton

Chair of the National Governors Association
- In office July 23, 2007 – July 14, 2008
- Preceded by: Janet Napolitano
- Succeeded by: Ed Rendell

Majority Leader of the Minnesota House of Representatives
- In office January 3, 1999 – January 3, 2003
- Preceded by: Ted Winter
- Succeeded by: Erik Paulsen

Member of the Minnesota House of Representatives from the 38B district
- In office January 3, 1993 – January 3, 2003
- Preceded by: Art Seaberg
- Succeeded by: Lynn Wardlow

Personal details
- Born: Timothy James Pawlenty; November 27, 1960 (age 65) Saint Paul, Minnesota, U.S.
- Party: Republican
- Spouse: Mary Anderson (m. 1987)
- Children: 2
- Education: University of Minnesota (BA, JD)

Timothy James Pawlenty (/pəˈlɛnti/ pə-LEN-tee; born November 27, 1960) is an American attorney, businessman, and politician who served from 2003 to 2011 as the 39th governor of Minnesota. A member of the Republican Party, Pawlenty served in the Minnesota House of Representatives from 1993 to 2003, and as House Majority Leader from 1999 to 2003. He unsuccessfully ran for the Republican presidential nomination in the 2012 presidential election.

Pawlenty graduated from the University of Minnesota, becoming a labor law attorney and the vice president of a software company. In 1992 he was elected to represent District 38B, a district in suburban Dakota County, in the Minnesota House of Representatives. He was reelected four times and was elected majority leader in 1998. After securing the Republican endorsement, Pawlenty won the three-way 2002 Minnesota gubernatorial election. He campaigned on a conservative platform with a pledge not to raise taxes. He worked to lower the state's deficit by cutting funds from state programs and instituting "user fees". He was reelected in 2006 by a margin of less than one percent. Although Pawlenty eliminated the budget deficit in his first term, the deficit returned as a result of the Great Recession in 2007. The effectiveness of Pawlenty's economic policy as governor is disputed.

As governor, Pawlenty also reformed Minnesota's education system, passed a concealed carry law, and codified a 24-hour wait period before receiving an abortion. His administration advocated for numerous notable public works projects, including the construction of the Northstar Commuter Rail Line and Target Field. From 2007 to 2008, Pawlenty chaired the National Governors Association.

Pawlenty was rumored to be a contender for both the Republican presidential and vice-presidential nominations in the 2008 presidential election. He went on to co-chair John McCain's unsuccessful 2008 presidential campaign. Pawlenty ran for president in the 2012 Republican presidential primary. His campaign fell short of expectations by failing to gain traction. After withdrawing from the race, Pawlenty became a finalist to join Mitt Romney on the 2012 ticket as the vice presidential candidate. He was not selected, but he served as co-chair of Romney's campaign until his departure two months before the election. Pawlenty sought a third term as governor of Minnesota in the 2018 election with Michelle Fischbach as his running mate. He lost the Republican primary to Jeff Johnson. As of 2025, Pawlenty is the most recent Republican governor of Minnesota.

In 2026, Pawlenty became president of the Solar Energy Industries Association, a trade association for the solar power industry.

== Early life, education, and early career ==
Pawlenty was born in Saint Paul, Minnesota, to Eugene Joseph Pawlenty, and his wife, Virginia Frances (née Oldenburg). His father, who drove a milk delivery truck, was of Polish descent, while his mother was of German ancestry. She died of cancer when he was 16. Pawlenty grew up in South St. Paul, where he played ice hockey on his high school's junior varsity squad.

Intending to become a dentist, Pawlenty enrolled in the University of Minnesota, the only one in his family to go beyond high school. But he changed his plans and spent the summers of 1980 and 1982 working as an intern at the office of U.S. Senator David Durenberger. In 1983, he graduated with a Bachelor of Arts in political science. He received a Juris Doctor from the University of Minnesota Law School in 1986. There, he met his wife, Mary Anderson, whom he married in 1987.

Pawlenty first worked as a labor law attorney at the firm Rider Bennett (formerly Rider, Bennett, Egan & Arundel), where he had interned while a law student. He later became vice president of a software as a service company, Wizmo Inc.

Having moved to Eagan, Minnesota, a suburb of Minneapolis–Saint Paul, Pawlenty was appointed to the city's Planning Commission by Mayor Vic Ellison. One year later, at age 28, he was elected to the City Council.

Pawlenty entered state politics in 1990 as a campaign advisor for Jon Grunseth's campaign for governor. After becoming engulfed in a scandal, Grunseth dropped out of the race just weeks before the general election. After Pawlenty himself became governor, he appointed Grunseth's ex-wife, Vicky Tigwell, to the board of the Minneapolis−Saint Paul International Airport, which was called out as an ethics and accountability issue in 2003.

== Minnesota House of Representatives ==
Pawlenty was elected to the Minnesota House of Representatives in 1992, winning 49.1% of the vote in District 38B (suburban Dakota County). In the House, he authored bills instituting term limits for committee chairmen, funding for infant parenting classes, minimum sentences for repeat domestic violence offenders, and community notification for sex offenders. In response to a state budget surplus, he advocated reducing taxes rather than increasing education funding. He was reelected four times and was chosen House Majority Leader when Republicans gained the majority in the State Legislature in 1998.

== Governorship ==
=== 2002 election ===
In 2002, Pawlenty wanted to run for governor, but party leaders made it clear they favored businessman Brian Sullivan. Pawlenty then decided on the U.S. Senate, but abandoned those plans when Vice President Dick Cheney asked him to step aside and allow former St. Paul mayor Norm Coleman to challenge Senator Paul Wellstone without Republican primary opposition. Pawlenty returned to his original ambition and won a hard-fought and narrow race against Sullivan in the Republican primary.

In the general election, Pawlenty faced two strong opponents. His main rival was veteran Democratic–Farmer–Labor (DFL) state senator Roger Moe. Former Democratic Congressman Tim Penny ran on the Independence Party ticket. (Note: Incumbent governor Jesse Ventura, a member of the Independence Party, chose not to seek a second term.) Until mid-October 2002, all three were essentially tied in the polls. Pawlenty's major campaign stances included a pledge not to raise taxes to balance the state's budget deficit (while allowing increases in license and user fees); that visa expiration dates be required to be printed on driver's licenses; that women seeking an abortion be required to wait 24 hours; enactment of a concealed carry gun law; and reform of the state's education requirements. He won the election with 43.8% of the vote. His largest gains after the tied polling were reportedly among voters in the suburbs of Minneapolis–St. Paul.

=== 2006 reelection ===
Pawlenty ran for reelection in 2006. Conservatives criticized him on funding issues, in particular two pieces of legislation for stadiums for the Gophers and Minnesota Twins, and bond issues for public transit, including the Northstar commuter rail line.

The race included Minnesota Attorney General Mike Hatch, of the DFL; Peter Hutchinson of the Independence Party; and Ken Pentel of the Green Party. Pawlenty won, defeating Hatch by less than one percent, though both the state House and Senate gained DFL majorities.

=== State budget ===
Pawlenty was elected in 2002 on a platform of balancing the state's budget without raising taxes. He emphasized his campaign and first term with the Taxpayers League of Minnesota slogan "no new taxes". His governorship was characterized by a historically low rate of spending growth. According to the Minnesota Management and Budget Department, general-fund expenditures from 2004 to 2011 increased an average of 3.5% per two-year term, compared to an average of 21.1% from 1960 to 2003 (these numbers are not inflation-adjusted). University of Minnesota political science professor Larry Jacobs said that slowing state spending and opposing tax increases were Pawlenty's signature issues.

In his first year as governor, Pawlenty inherited a projected two-year budget deficit of $4.3 billion, the largest in Minnesota history. After a contentious budget session with a Democrat-controlled Senate, he signed a package of fee increases, spending reductions, and government reorganization that eliminated the deficit. It reduced the rate of funding increases for state services, including transportation, social services, and welfare, and enacted a perennial proposal to restructure city aid based on immediate need rather than historical factors. Pawlenty agreed to several compromises, abandoning a public employee wage freeze and property tax restrictions.

During his second term, Pawlenty erased a $2.7-billion deficit by cutting spending, shifting payments, and using one-time federal stimulus money. His final budget (2010–11) was the state's first two-year period since 1960 in which net government expenditures decreased. Pawlenty has claimed this as "the first time in 150 years" that spending was cut, but fact-checkers disputed this claim as no public budget records before 1960 are known to exist.

Some criticized Pawlenty for providing a short-term budget solution but coming up short in his long-term strategy as governor. The state department of Management and Budget reported that the two-year budget starting in July 2011 was projected to come up $4.4 billion short. Former Minnesota Governor Arne Carlson, a Republican, criticized Pawlenty's budget strategy: he borrowed more than $1 billion from the tobacco settlement (money set aside for health care), more than $1.4 billion from K-12 education funding, and more than $400 million from the Health Care Access Fund for low-income families, among other short-term shifts in accounting. The result was a $5-billion deficit, the seventh largest in the United States. Minnesota property taxes rose $2.5 billion, more than the previous 16 years combined, and Moody's lowered the state's bond rating. Carlson told Time, "I don't think any governor has left behind a worse financial mess than [Pawlenty] has." Pawlenty responded, "My friend governor Arne Carlson is, of course, now an Obama and John Kerry supporter."

==== Minnesota Supreme Court case ====
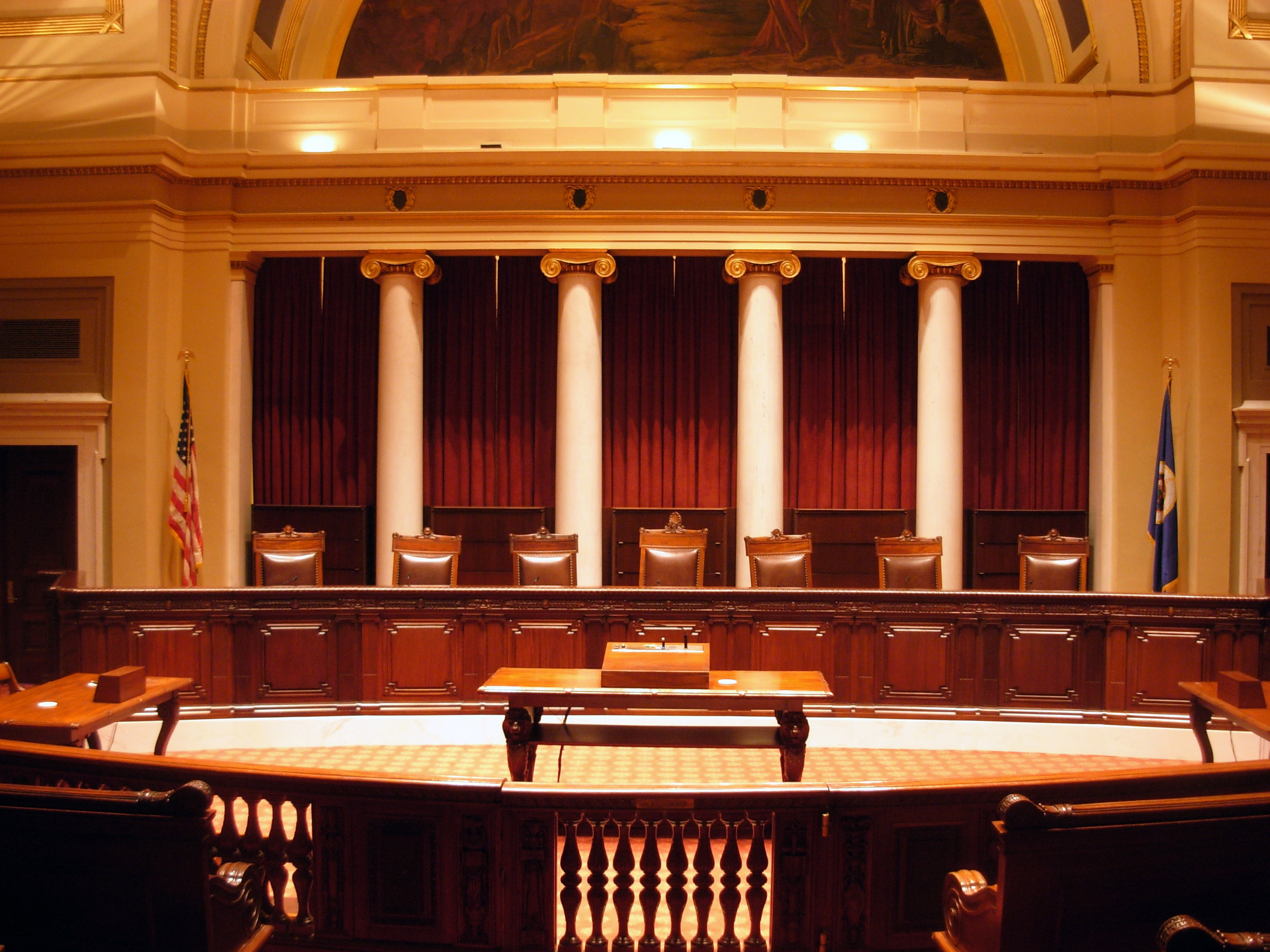
Minnesota Supreme Court chamber at the Minnesota State Capitol

While Pawlenty said he was "confident" in his right to use unallotment, the Minnesota Supreme Court ruled against him, 4 to 3, in a May 2010 decision. His budget had been the subject of a lawsuit in Ramsey County District Court, which was decided against him. Judge Kathleen Gearin ruled that Pawlenty had exceeded his constitutional authority in making unilateral spending cuts to a $5.3-million special dietary program that he had unalloted. Attorney David Lillehaug said initially, "This is, I don't think it's understating this to say, this is one of the most important court cases in Minnesota legal history." Pawlenty announced the following day that he would appeal; he filed his brief in February, and arguments were heard on March 15. In May, the Supreme Court affirmed Gearin's ruling, writing, "Because the legislative and executive branches never enacted a balanced budget for the 2010–2011 biennium, use of the unallotment power to address the unresolved deficit exceeded the authority granted to the executive branch by the statute." Pawlenty responded:

I will fight to reduce spending and taxes in Minnesota and that battle continues. My commitment to the people of Minnesota remains the same: we will balance the budget without raising taxes.

After the ruling, as the 2010 legislative session drew to a close, Pawlenty vetoed a budget that would have fixed a $2.9-billion deficit by adding a new tax bracket for six-figure incomes. In response to the proposal, he criticized Democrats for attempting to raise taxes during an extremely difficult economic situation. Eventually, due in part to the efforts of House Speaker Margaret Kelliher, who was running for the 2010 Democratic nomination for governor of Minnesota, the legislature passed legislation approving nearly all the original unallotments.

=== Funding projects ===
Since the Minnesota Constitution prohibits state-run gambling outside of Native territory, Pawlenty proposed negotiating with Minnesota's 11 tribes over profit-sharing of their casinos. Legislators also pushed a proposal to turn Canterbury Park horse track into a racino. The plan was poorly received by Northern Tribes who would operate part of the racino, citing reluctance to compete with other tribes. Tribes with casinos opposed the expanded gambling and some legislators objected on moral grounds that the state shouldn't exploit problem gamblers. Politicians in heavy tribal areas feared losing campaign-finance sources if they supported the plan. Delays by the Legislature ended with the bill being pulled from committee. Tribes spent millions lobbying legislatures in 2004.

Pawlenty worked throughout 2006 to fund a Minnesota Twins baseball stadium in Minneapolis. The resulting Minnesota Twins-Hennepin County ballpark bill called for an increased county sales tax, which passed the state legislature and was symbolically signed in at the Hubert H. Humphrey Metrodome. The majority of Hennepin County commissioners did not feel a referendum was necessary to approve the sales tax because of the delay it would cause. Pawlenty and the legislature agreed, citing 10 years of debate, and exempted the county from state law requiring one in the bill.

In June 2006, Pawlenty signed a $999.9-million public works bill that included funding for additional work on the Northstar Commuter rail line (a change in position from reservations about the idea he initially expressed), an expanded Faribault prison, a bioscience building at the University of Minnesota, and science facilities at Minnesota State University in Mankato. The bill also funded a $26-million expansion of the University of Minnesota's Carlson School of Management.

In 2011, Pawlenty shut down an Islamic finance program that was part of a larger program to increase home ownership in Minnesota. His spokesperson said the program accommodated the Muslim ban on interest. Adam Sorensen from Time questioned whether this was a case of double standards, pointing out New York's kosher food regulations, Blue Laws that prohibit alcohol sales on Sundays, and Pawlenty's own creation of "The Governor's Council On Faith-Based And Community Initiatives".

=== Education ===
In the budget process, Pawlenty made an effort to preserve education funding while cutting other government spending. In 2009, he bolstered education funding with federal stimulus grants. Despite this, education funding fell from $9,700 to $8,400 per student (adjusted for inflation) during his tenure. Pawlenty was an advocate of charter schools and was praised by the National Alliance for Public Charter Schools for his education policies. In 2010, the organization rated Minnesota #1 in the country for charter school promotion.

Pawlenty oversaw the repeal of the Profile of Learning kindergarten through 12th grade graduation requirements and sought to reinstate them. Renamed the Minnesota Academic Standards, they were guided by Department of Education commissioner Cheri Pierson Yecke. The bill's first draft raised concern among the education review boards about the amount of content, its age-appropriateness, and a Eurocentric social sciences portion. Yecke revised and expanded material based on the response. Both legislative houses passed the Academic Standards bill, but her confirmation as commissioner was rejected by the DFL-majority Minnesota Senate. She was seen as an outsider coming from Virginia and became unpopular for having pushed the academic reforms during a tight budget session as well as her critical view of Minnesota public schools. In her confirmation hearing, DFLers also expressed concern over her conservative viewpoints.

In June 2006, Pawlenty proposed the ACHIEVE program for the top 25% of high school graduates. The program would pay for tuition for the first two years (four years for selected fields such as science, technology, engineering and math) and would cost the state an estimated $112 million per two-year cycle. The program was not included in the 2007 higher education bill.

Pawlenty used an accounting change called a tax shift to balance the state deficit without raising taxes. School districts statewide unexpectedly lost $58 million in interest and reserve revenue.

In 2010, Pawlenty vetoed a bill that the legislature had passed 110 to 20 (HF 3164), calling for Minnesota State Colleges & Universities (MnSCU) to revamp its credit-transferring system within five years to fix "minimal loss of credits for transferring students" who had been losing between 10 and 30 percent of their credits. Pawlenty found it "unnecessary" because MnSCU was fixing its system already "through internal actions and policy changes".

=== Transportation ===
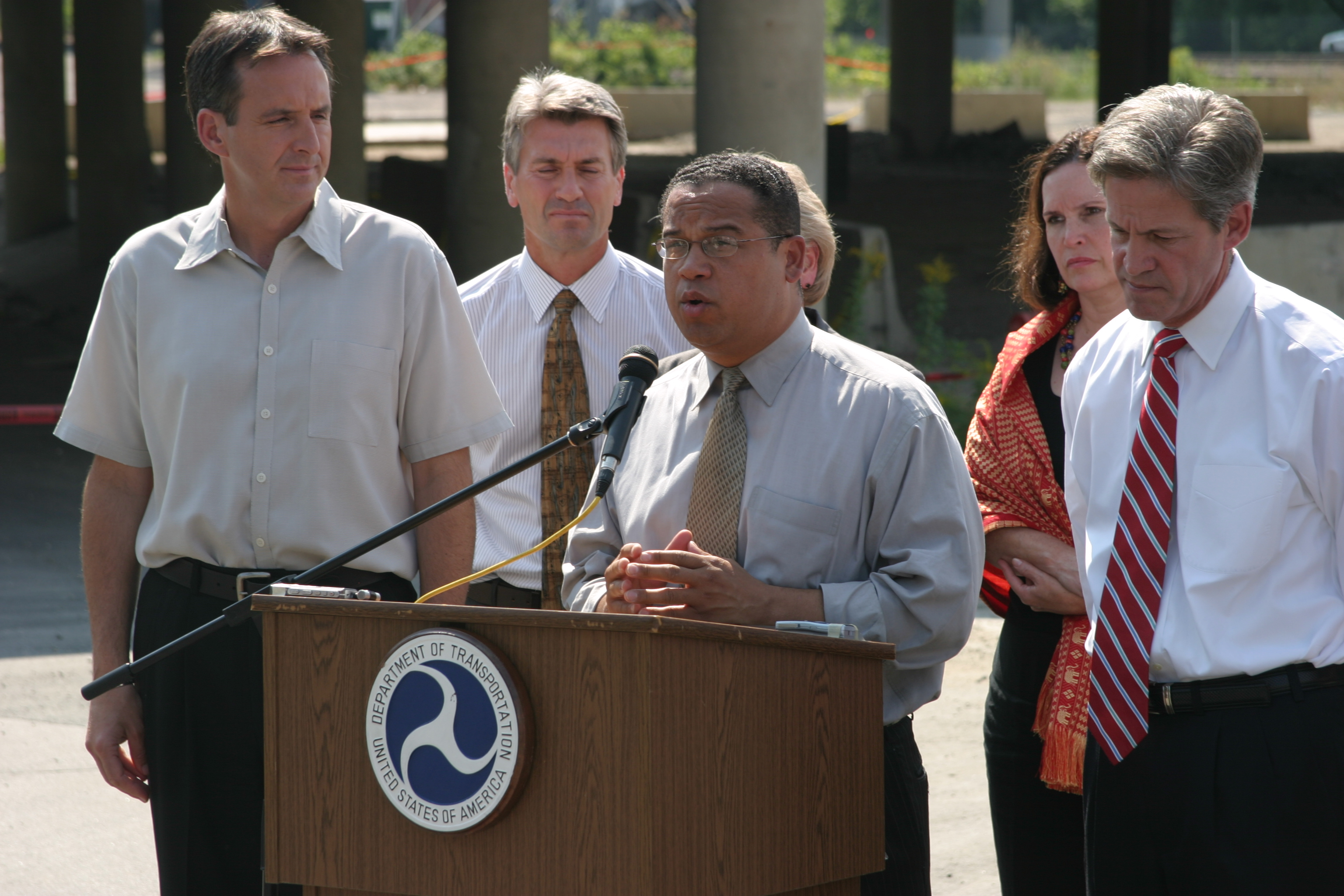
U.S. Representative Keith Ellison speaking at the site of the I-35W Mississippi River Bridge collapse in Minneapolis. He is flanked by Governor Pawlenty on the picture's left. To right: Minneapolis Mayor R. T. Rybak, Secretary of Transportation Mary Peters behind Ellison, U.S. Representative Betty McCollum, and Senator Norm Coleman.

During Pawlenty's first term, urban traffic congestion was a significant concern of voters. He appointed his lieutenant governor, Carol Molnau, as transportation commissioner, and the legislature approved the appointment in May 2004. Molnau attempted to reform the transportation department, Mn/DOT, using concepts such as "design-build". Legislators criticized her performance as transportation commissioner, citing ineffective leadership and management, and removed her from that role in February 2008, a decision Pawlenty said was motivated by partisanship.

Pawlenty favored raising fees and imposing toll lanes on roads as the primary means of discouraging excessive traffic. During his term, the carpool lanes of Interstate 394 leading into downtown Minneapolis were converted into high-occupancy toll lanes. Pawlenty used or threatened vetoes in 2005, 2007 and 2008 on legislation funding proposed highway expansion, infrastructure repairs, road maintenance, and mass transit. The 2008 veto was in spite of Pawlenty's announcement that he would consider reversing his opposition to a state gas-tax increase for funding road and bridge repairs in the wake of the collapse of the I-35W Mississippi River bridge.

Pawlenty had opposed the Northstar Commuter Rail as a legislator, but changed his position in 2004, announcing a funding plan to jump-start the project, when the Bush administration determined the rail line was deemed cost-effective and time-saving for commuters.

In April 2008, during the budget bonding bill signing, Pawlenty used his line-item veto on $70 million for building the Central Corridor light-rail project intended to connect Minneapolis and Saint Paul. In vetoing the expenditure, he did not consult Metro Council head Peter Bell, the project leader. Pawlenty said he vetoed the bill in order to send a message to the legislature, which had exceeded his initial budget request, that they needed to "stay focused, be fiscally disciplined, set priorities and solve this budget crisis in a fiscally disciplined way." But he supported the project and had requested the money in the bonding bill he submitted to the legislature. The veto disappointed some of Minnesota's U.S. representatives, including Republican Senator Norm Coleman, who pledged to "raise my voice as strong as I can, as loud as I can. The federal commitment is there." Pawlenty's veto might have delayed the state's ability to receive federal matching funds for the project, but Bell said the project was not derailed. The Central Corridor funding issue was resolved on May 19, 2008, with the state pledging the original amount for the project after legislators compromised with Pawlenty's budget requests.

There were Republican state legislators who supported other cuts of the bonding bill, including Doug Magnus, the ranking Republican on the House Transportation Finance Division, who praised Pawlenty's "fiscal responsibility". Critics, including Saint Paul Mayor Chris Coleman, called Pawlenty's veto "political gamesmanship", seeing it as retribution for the legislature's override of Pawlenty's veto of a transportation bonding bill. They noted that cuts overwhelmingly targeted Democratic districts, and Democratic stronghold Saint Paul most heavily.

=== Crime ===
Crime in Minnesota was a high-profile political issue during Pawlenty's governorship. When crime rates in Minneapolis spiked up 16% from 2004 to 2005, city officials blamed Pawlenty for large cuts to state aid, which they said restricted public safety resources. He in turn criticized the city for poorly allocating its funding and fired three city officials.

Pawlenty made two large efforts to expand penalties for sexual offenders. In response to his first proposal in 2005, the state legislature passed a large package of sentencing reforms. One new instrument was the possibility of a life sentence without parole for serious offenders. Pawlenty expressed disapproval of the courts' reluctance to use this option: only seven people received such a sentence in its first two years of implementation. He pushed for even harsher sentences in 2010, increasing the presumptive sentence for first-degree sex offenses from 12 years to 25 and increasing it further for repeat offenders. At the same time he advocated a $90-million expansion of the state's civil commitment program for sexual offenders, maintaining that the increased criminal sentences would keep the commitment program's cost under control. According to the Star Tribune, "A report on Minnesota's sex-offender program delivered to legislators in the final days of the Pawlenty administration was heavily edited by a top political appointee to reflect the former governor's skepticism about the effectiveness of treatment and to delete arguments for expanded community resources for offenders."

Early in 2006, after issuing a study that estimated the cost of illegal immigration to the state as approximately $188 million, Pawlenty announced a program for changing the way the state dealt with persons who were in the United States illegally. He said the economic benefits of illegal immigration did not justify the illegal behavior. Pawlenty's extensive proposal included the designation of 10 state law enforcement officials as the Minnesota Illegal Immigration Enforcement Team, "trained to question, detain and arrest suspected illegal immigrants" with a focus on "such crimes as human trafficking, identity theft, methamphetamine distribution and terrorism". He rounded out his proposal with tougher penalties for false identification and instituting a fine of up to $5,000 for employers of illegal immigrants. His proposal was challenged by DFL senators who preferred increased legal immigration to punitive action.

=== Energy policy ===
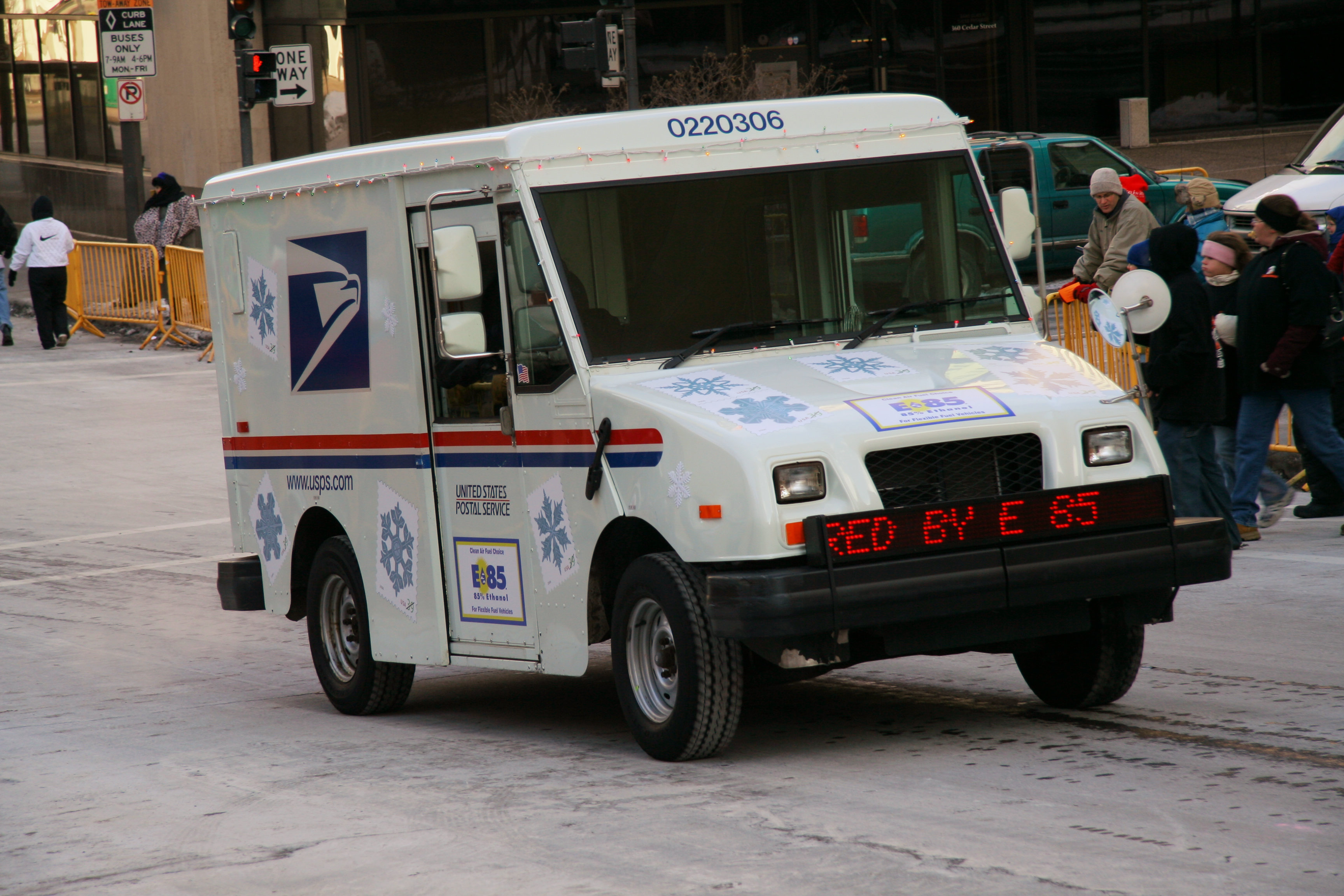
A United States Postal Service vehicle advertising its use of E85 fuel during the Saint Paul Winter Carnival parade in January 2007

Minnesota has mandated a 10% mixture of gasoline and ethanol (gasohol) since 1997. Pawlenty has also lobbied the Governors' Ethanol Coalition to mandate higher ethanol use nationwide.

Conservative Republican governors were not supportive of Pawlenty's presentation on clean energy to the governor's association, which he gave in cooperation with Ed Rendell, who was the governor of Pennsylvania and the National Governors Association's Democratic vice-chairman. With Kathleen Sebelius of Kansas, Pawlenty was co-chair of the association's energy committee. The effort received "adamant opposition" from governors of oil producing states.

In 2007, Governor Pawlenty signed the Next Generation Energy Act of 2007 into law and, along with six other Midwestern governors, the Midwestern Greenhouse Gas Accord. These directed state agencies to develop a plan to reduce greenhouse gases, and "develop a market-based and multi-sector cap-and-trade mechanism". However, by 2009 Pawlenty had reversed his position and called cap-and-trade "overly bureaucratic" and a potential "disaster". By 2011, Pawlenty's position had changed sufficiently to state "the weight of the evidence is that most of it, maybe all of it, is because of natural causes."

=== Health ===
In 2004, Minnesota's Star Tribune newspaper opined that the credibility of Pawlenty's commissioner of health, Dianne Mandernach, suffered when a website posting by the department suggested that abortion might have a role in breast cancer. She also angered many when it was learned she had delayed releasing government research on cancer in miners. In 2007, Mandernach resigned.

In 2005, Pawlenty asked a U.S. Senate subcommittee to allow his MinnesotaCare health plan to expand and continue allowing state residents and employees to import cheaper Canadian prescription drugs.

In 2007, Pawlenty signed into law the 2007 Omnibus Health and Human Services Appropriations Bill, which provided funding for the Health Care Transformation Task Force, a panel of health care experts charged with exploring ways to reduce health care spending, improve quality, and ensure that Minnesota develops a universal health care plan by 2011.

Later in his tenure he used health care funding cuts as a mechanism to balance the state budget. After years of assuring doctors that the state "sick tax" would be used only to fund health welfare programs, in 2009 Pawlenty recommended a 3% cut in physician reimbursements from the state and asked that the sick tax be put instead into the state's general budget. Pawlenty used a line-item veto to remove $381 million from health and human services funding, a removal which could lead to 35,000 Minnesotans' losing their General Assistance Medical Care (GAMC) health insurance in 2011. Hennepin County Medical Center—the largest provider of health care to Minnesota's poor and uninsured—closed two clinics, reduced its staff and reduced access to non-emergency services. State Senator Linda Berglin wrote a bill that would extend GAMC funding.

In 2010, he refused federal health care funds including more than $1 billion to expand the number of Minnesotans covered by Medicaid, $68 million for a high-risk insurance pool, $1 million to help set up an insurance exchange where consumers could shop for health coverage, and $850,000 for teenage pregnancy prevention. Pawlenty accepted a $500,000 abstinence-only sex-education grant that would require $350,000 in matching state money. Pawlenty said, "It doesn't say we have to apply for all of them."

=== Foreign relations ===
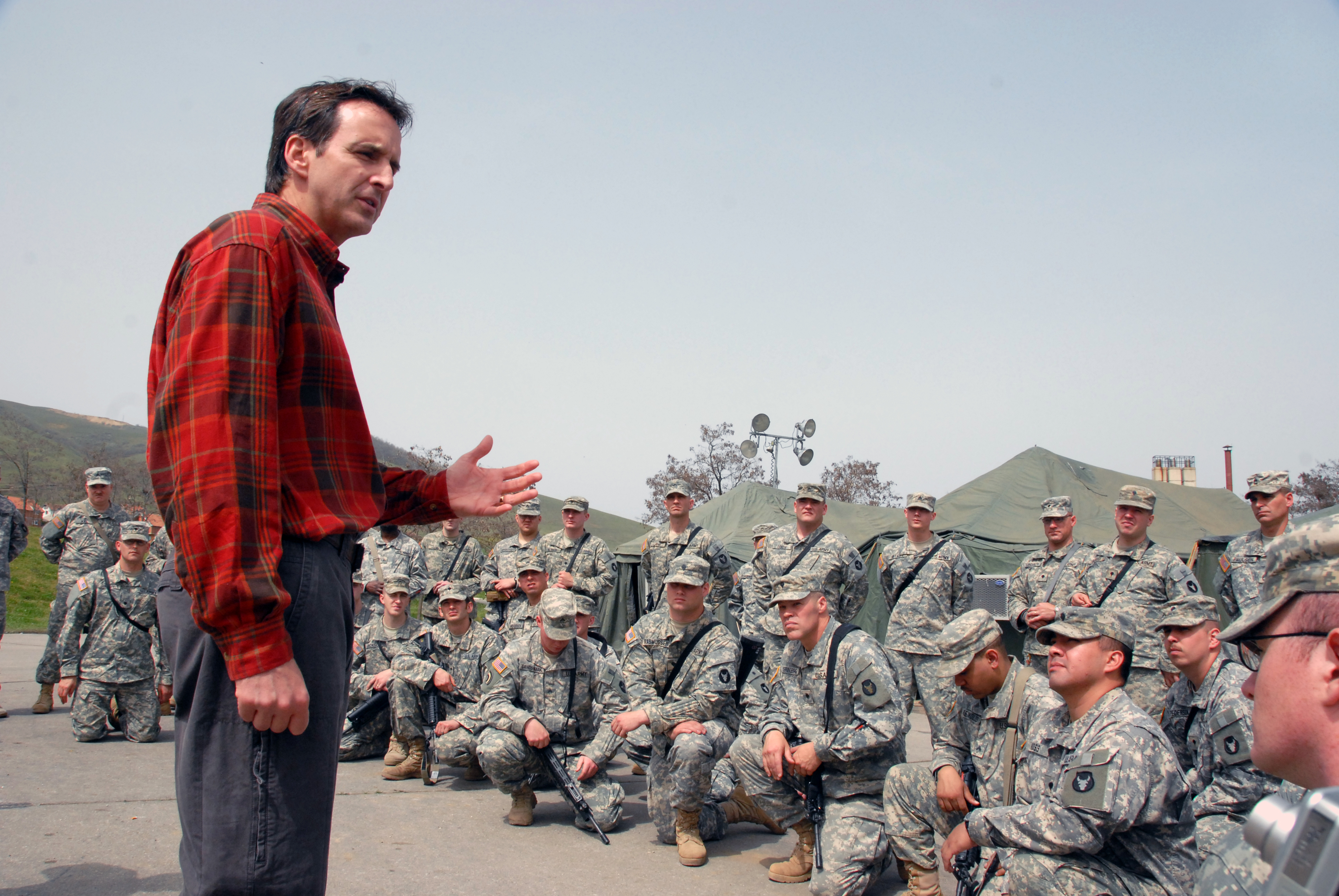
Tim Pawlenty meeting Minnesota National Guard troops in Kosovo (April 12, 2008)

Pawlenty's first term coincided with the deployment of National Guardsmen from numerous states, connected with the war on terror and the wars in Iraq and Afghanistan. During his two terms Pawlenty made trips to Iraq, Afghanistan, Bosnia, Kosovo, and Kuwait visiting Minnesota troops.

Pawlenty was visited in 2004 by Mexican President Vicente Fox in talks to strengthen trade. Fox announced that his country would open a consulate in Minnesota the next year, removing the need for Mexican residents in the state to travel out of state for identification papers and other materials. In mid-2006, in response to illegal immigration, Pawlenty sent Minnesota National Guardsmen to the U.S.–Mexico border at the request of the U.S. Department of Defense and the U.S. Department of Homeland Security.

Pawlenty took a delegation of nearly 200 Minnesotan business, government, academic and civic leaders on a weeklong trip to China in mid-November 2005. The stated objectives were to provide a forum for companies to acquire market information, assess market potential, evaluate market entry strategies and identify potential business partners, as well as to promote Chinese investment in Minnesota. Pawlenty also led Minnesota trade delegations to Canada in 2003, Poland and the Czech Republic in 2004, India in 2007, and Israel in 2008.

=== Other activities ===
Throughout his eight-year tenure, Pawlenty hosted a weekly one-hour radio show on WCCO-AM, a tradition he inherited from his predecessor as governor, Jesse Ventura. Pawlenty was the chairman of the National Governors Association for the 2007–2008 term. He also served as chair of the Midwestern Governors Association in 2006.

Beginning in 2005, Pawlenty was rumored in the press as a potential candidate for president of the United States. When formally announcing his candidacy for a second term as Governor of Minnesota on May 31, 2006, Pawlenty said, "As to my future, if I run for governor and win, I will serve out my term for four years as governor." On January 15, 2007, after being reelected, Pawlenty said, "I am committed to serving out my term as governor. That's what I am going to do."

In 2007, it was announced that Pawlenty would be serving in a lead role for McCain as a national co-chair of his presidential exploratory committee which led to Pawlenty's becoming co-chairman of McCain's campaign (along with Phil Gramm and Tom Loeffler). In January 2008, a reporter for the Minneapolis Star Tribune suggested Pawlenty's renewed focus on his proposed immigration reform plans might be politically motivated as counterbalance to McCain's less favorable guest worker program.

For many weeks, Pawlenty was widely considered to be a leading candidate for the vice-presidential nomination on the Republican ticket with John McCain in the 2008 presidential election. In a surprise, McCain chose Alaska Governor Sarah Palin. In the aftermath of the running mate selection, Pawlenty was regarded as a potential contender for the position of Secretary of Transportation in a possible McCain presidency.

In 2008, Pawlenty expressed support for the Troubled Asset Relief Program (TARP). But in 2010, he claimed that he had made those statements solely as a surrogate for presidential nominee McCain and never actually supported the idea himself. On May 23, 2011, Pawlenty formally announced he'd run for the Republican presidential nomination, saying, "politicians are often afraid that if they're too honest, they might lose an election. I'm afraid that in 2012, if we're not honest enough, we may lose our country."

== 2012 presidential campaign ==
=== Early steps ===
In February 2005, ABC News identified him as a potential candidate for president. Pawlenty decided not to seek a third consecutive term as governor, and so was not a candidate in the November 2010 gubernatorial election. In July 2009, Public Policy Polling conducted a poll that showed that President Obama was favored to win against Pawlenty in his home state of Minnesota by more than 10 points. In October 2009, a CNN article suggested that Pawlenty was contemplating a 2012 White House bid. Among those advising him in preparation for a potential presidential run was lobbyist and former Congressman Vin Weber.

In late 2009, Pawlenty began taking steps that many saw as leading to a 2012 presidential bid. He visited Iowa in November 2009 and April 2010, making political speeches. In January 2011, The New York Times reported that "Few Americans, in fact, even know his name." In January 2011, Pawlenty told the College Republicans group at The George Washington University "If I decide to run it would be for president, not vice president."

=== Book tour and political positions ===
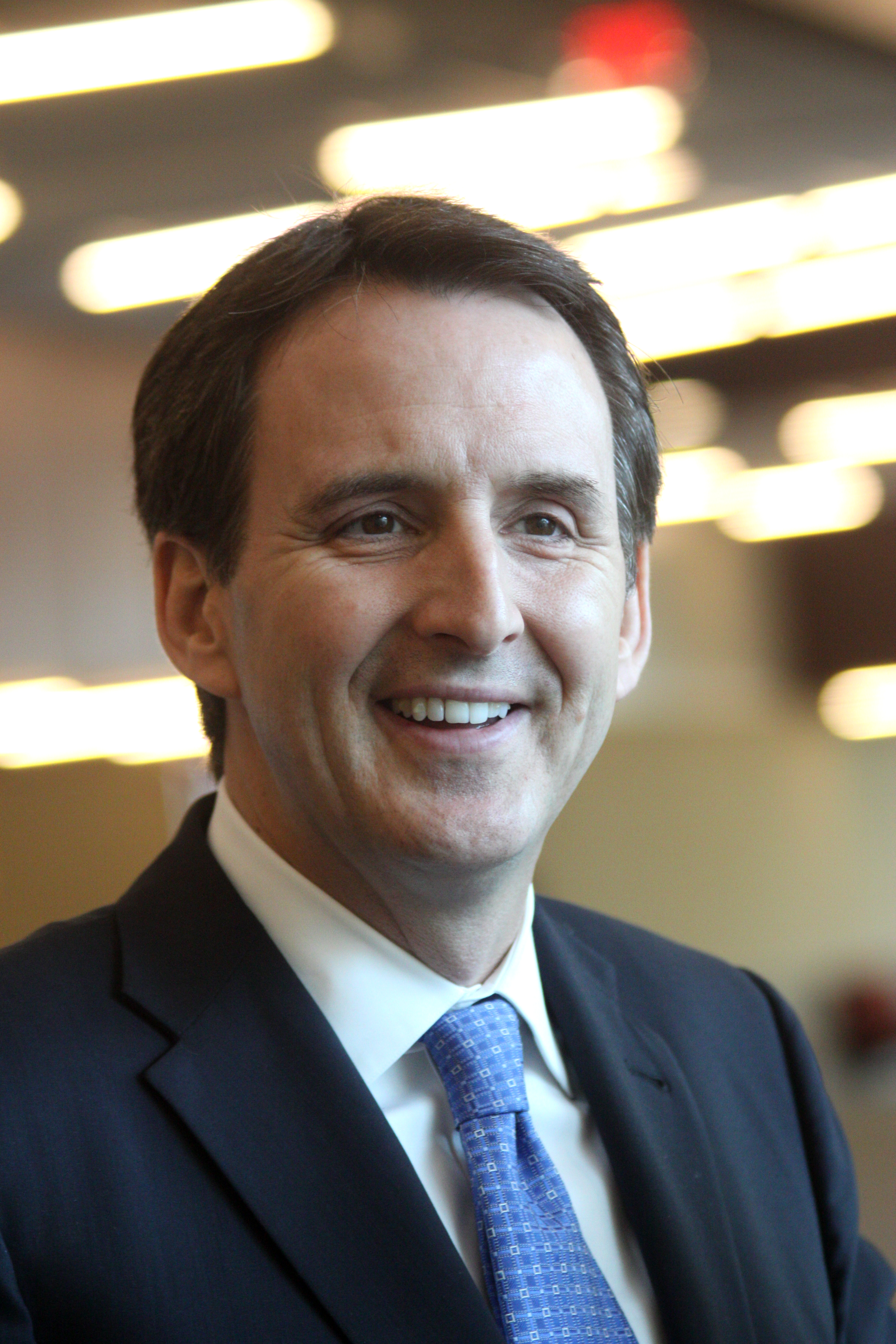
Pawlenty at a book signing in February 2011 in Phoenix, Arizona.

In 2011, Pawlenty went on tour to promote his book Courage to Stand. Pawlenty calls himself a social conservative. In his extended interview with Jon Stewart on The Daily Show, he said he thinks United States Social Security and Medicare need to be cut to balance the federal budget. Pawlenty believes that state governments should outlaw abortion, except for cases of rape, incest, and to save a woman's life. He thinks the United States Supreme Court decided Roe v. Wade wrongly, abortion being a state, not a federal, matter. He opposes same-sex marriage and civil unions, and said on talk radio "... I have been a public supporter of maintaining Don't ask, don't tell and I would support reinstating it as well".

In December 2010, Pawlenty was one of three U.S. governors who publicly declared support for the right-wing evangelical Christian group Family Research Council.

Pawlenty's tour was in Minneapolis, San Francisco, and Dallas, and it ended in January in Iowa, where the presidential caucuses were scheduled for February 6, 2012. "That will come up fast", he said, "if I do run." In an interview with Pat Kessler of WCCO-TV in Minneapolis, when asked about his feelings regarding a potential run for president by Representative Michele Bachmann, Pawlenty said, "I have a lot of respect for Michele Bachmann … Whether she runs or not, it's gonna be a big field. There's gonna be five, six, seven, eight people running … Whoever wants to run can run. The more, the merrier."

In a December 2010 column in The Wall Street Journal, Pawlenty argued in favor of the historical benefits of "private sector" labor unions and strongly against "public sector" labor unions, whose collective bargaining rights he would like to see curbed: "The rise of the labor movement in the early 20th century was a triumph for America's working class. In an era of deep economic anxiety, unions stood up for hard-working but vulnerable families, protecting them from physical and economic exploitation." He also criticized modern unions: "The moral case for unions—protecting working families from exploitation—does not apply to public employment... Unionized public employees are making more money, receiving more generous benefits, and enjoying greater job security than the working families forced to pay for it with ever-higher taxes, deficits and debt."

=== Candidacy ===
On March 21, 2011, Pawlenty announced via Facebook that he had formed an exploratory committee in preparation for a potential run for the 2012 Republican presidential nomination.

On April 12, 2011, Pawlenty said on CNN's Piers Morgan Tonight that he was "running for president" and not for vice president, adding that a formal announcement would be given in several weeks. On Twitter, his spokesman said CNN took his comments out of context.

On May 23, 2011, Pawlenty launched his candidacy for president in a speech in Iowa stating: "I'm going to try something a little unusual in politics. I'm just going to tell the truth." A YouTube video appeared a day before. The Wall Street Journal wrote of his candidacy, and the luck he experienced in the GOP's field, that Pawlenty has a "golden chance to become the chief rival to... Mitt Romney".

Pawlenty finished third in the Ames Straw Poll on August 13, 2011, behind the winner Michele Bachmann and the runner-up Ron Paul. Before the Ames debate, he took a more aggressive stance against Romney, including the coining the term "Obamneycare". When pressed by John King during CNN's June 13, 2011, debate to address why he used the word, he backed off. However, he denied that he backed off. The following day he announced his decision to withdraw from the presidential race. On September 12, 2011, Pawlenty announced his endorsement of former Governor Mitt Romney of Massachusetts, as well as his position as national co-chair for Romney's campaign. Romney retired over $400,000 of Pawlenty's campaign debt.

== Post-presidential campaign ==
On September 20, 2012, Pawlenty's advisor Brian McClung announced to Associated Press that Pawlenty would resign as the co-chairman of Mitt Romney's electoral campaign. He was to head the Financial Services Roundtable (FSR), a financial service industry lobby group in Washington, D.C. He would not be running in the 2014 gubernatorial election in Minnesota nor in the state's 2014 senatorial election. He assumed the positions of President & CEO. He replaced Steve Bartlett, a former U.S. Representative from Texas who had held the positions since 1999.

In November 2012, Pawlenty said that "Republicans and Democrats will have to reconcile their differences on spending and taxes because the 'walls of reality are closing in on them'" relative to the federal government's looming "fiscal cliff". Presenting himself as not from Wall Street or from Washington and, having previously criticized "entrenched financial interests", he said he could "bring a fresh and new voice to those debates". He also "refuted assertions that implementation of the Dodd-Frank Act, legislation enacted roughly 27 months [earlier] in response to the financial crisis, ha[d] been delayed because of lobbying".

=== 2018 gubernatorial campaign ===
In February 2018, Pawlenty began considering running for a third term as governor of Minnesota and started meeting with Republican donors and advisors. He announced his candidacy on April 5. Pawlenty lost the Republican primary to Hennepin County Commissioner Jeff Johnson. His campaign was affected by disparaging statements he made about then presidential candidate Donald Trump. Pawlenty eventually declared his support for Trump before running for governor, but said after his defeat that the "Republican party has shifted" and that he was not a "Trump-like politician" in the "era of Trump". He said he was ending his career in politics.

=== Solar Energy Industries Association ===
In May 2026, the Solar Energy Industries Association named Pawlenty its president and CEO, succeeding Abigail Ross Hopper following her resignation. The Washington, D.C.-based trade association represents the interests of the solar energy industry. Pawlenty started serving in the position in June.

== Personal life ==
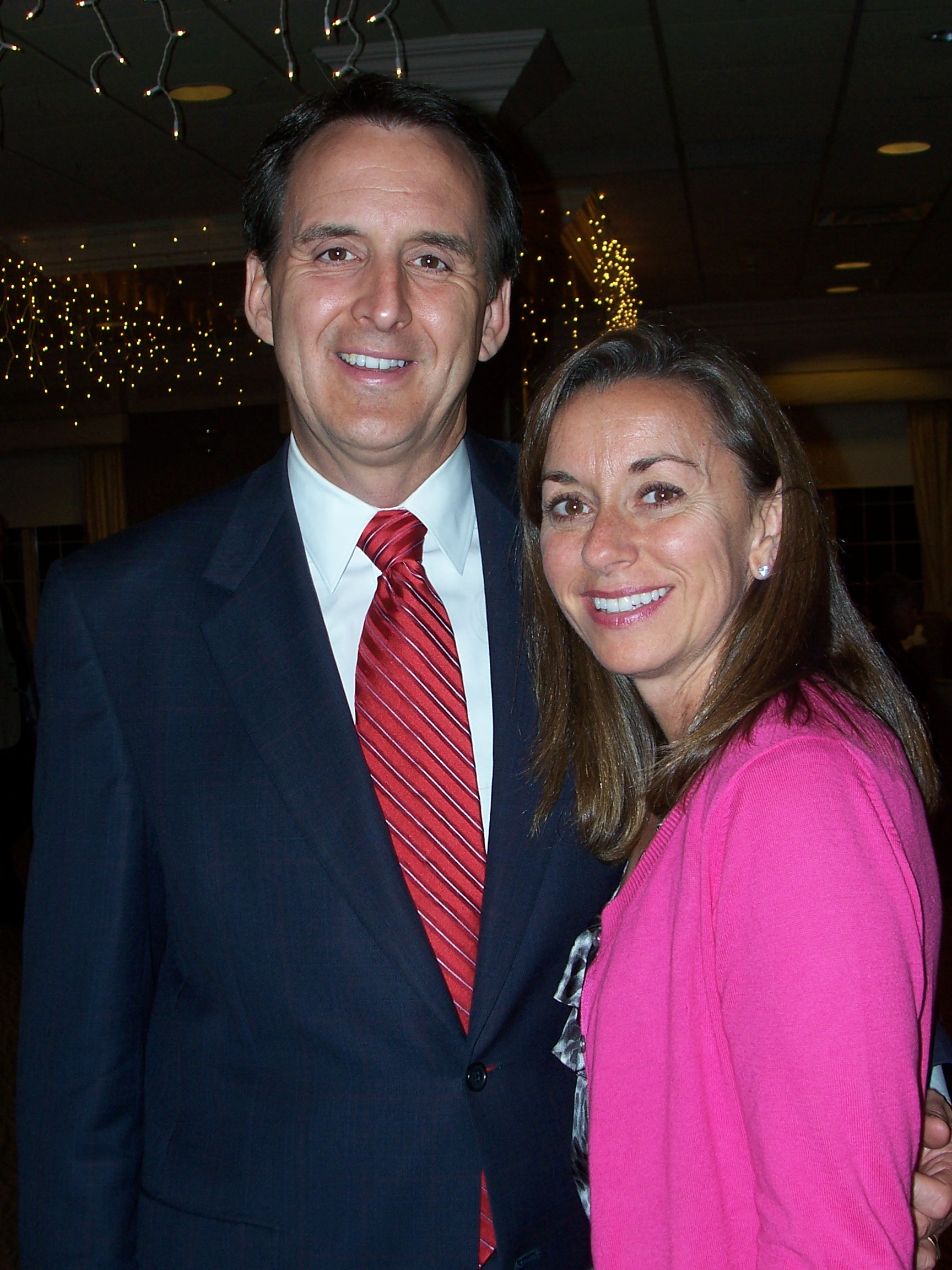
Tim Pawlenty with his wife, Mary

Pawlenty and his wife Mary have two daughters, Anna and Mara. Mary was appointed as a judge of the Dakota County District Court in Hastings, Minnesota, in 1994. After he was elected governor in 2002, the family remained at their Eagan home instead of moving into the Governor's residence because his wife was required to live in her judicial district. In 2007, she left her judicial position to become General Counsel of the National Arbitration Forum, a dispute-resolution company based in Minneapolis. She stayed only briefly before departing for another dispute-resolution company, the Gilbert Mediation Center.

Pawlenty was raised a Roman Catholic. His conversion to Evangelical Protestantism has been attributed to Mary, who is a member of Wooddale Church in Eden Prairie, Minnesota, a member congregation of the Minnesota Baptist Conference. In a January 2011 interview, Pawlenty said, "I love and respect and admire the Catholic Church. I still attend Mass once in a while there. The church I now attend is an interdenominational church which has got many former Catholics in it, and so we share the Christian faith and the Bible. I had to reconcile my faith life with my wife so we could have a consistent, integrated family faith life."

Pawlenty frequently uses (and is called by) the mononym "TPaw" or "T-Paw".

Pawlenty ran the 2004 Twin Cities Marathon, finishing with a time of 3 hours, 57 minutes, and 52 seconds. He was the first sitting governor to run the race.

== Public image ==
=== Political views ===
Pawlenty is generally considered a conservative on the American political spectrum. With regard to his economic record, he has drawn mixed reviews from fiscally conservative interest groups. The lobbying group Taxpayers League of Minnesota gave Pawlenty an average approval score of 80% during his years as a state legislator, while the Cato Institute think-tank gave him scores ranging from C to A across his eight years as governor. In February 2008, Washington Post columnist Robert Novak wrote that Pawlenty was the most conservative Minnesota governor since Governor Theodore Christianson in the 1920s. A 2011 white paper by the Club for Growth, analyzing Pawlenty as a presidential candidate, found his political stance difficult to identify. The group praised him for reduced growth in spending and taxation, but found that he "has some simply inexcusable tax hikes in his record" and questioned his support of proposals such as "mandatory vegetable oil in gasoline, cap and trade, and a statewide smoking ban". Chris Edwards, a director at Cato, speculated that Pawlenty's rightward tack in his second term was related to his impending presidential run. In Pawlenty's 2018 Minnesota gubernatorial campaign, he received an A rating from the National Rifle Association of America, supported permit-to-carry laws, and was open to an optional background check for private firearm sales.

Pawlenty voted for President Donald Trump and "support[s] most of what's he's doing, nearly all of what he's doing on a policy level." In 2016, Pawlenty had expressed disapproval of Trump's "comments and language and behavior", calling the president "unsound, uninformed, unhinged and unfit" during his campaign. Pawlenty stated that since the election, "he's made a lot of great progress as leader of our country and president of the United States in terms of policy priorities and the outcomes."

=== Approval ratings ===
In April 2009, 46% of Minnesotans approved of Pawlenty, while 40% disapproved. Among registered Republicans nationwide in July 2009, 38% had a favorable view of him while 33% didn't, according to a Rasmussen Reports survey. In March 2010, 42% of Minnesotans approved of Pawlenty, while 52% disapproved.

In October 2010, a Rasmussen report showed that Pawlenty had a 49% approval rating among Minnesotans, with 49% disapproving. A March 2011 survey by Gallup stated that Pawlenty began his presidential run with only 41% name recognition in the GOP. Also in March 2011, the Public Policy Polling (PPP) agency found that nationwide voters had a net negative view of Pawlenty, with 15% viewing him favorably versus 33% unfavorably. In a 2011 PPP poll of registered Minnesota voters conducted from May 27–30, 42% of Minnesotans had a favorable opinion of Pawlenty, while 52% had an unfavorable opinion of him. In the presidential race, President Obama lead Pawlenty by 51% to 43%, suggesting Pawlenty could lose his home state to President Obama were he the 2012 GOP nominee.

=== Electoral history ===
Minnesota District 38B state representative elections, 1992–2000
Year	Republican			DFL			Constitution			Total	Source
Year	Name	Votes	%	Name	Votes	%	Name	Votes	%	Total	Source
1992	Tim Pawlenty	9,610	49.1%	Linda Rother	8,773	44.8%	James Russell McMahon	253	1.3%	19,583	
1994	Tim Pawlenty	12,172	81.0%	None			None			15,022	
1996	Tim Pawlenty	14,747	74.4%	None			None			19,822	
1998	Tim Pawlenty	9,118	48.5%	Leo Brisbois	7,819	41.6%	None			18,809	
2000	Tim Pawlenty	13,779	59.6%	Gary Moore	7,239	31.3%	None			23,100	

Minnesota gubernatorial elections, 2002–2006
Year	Republican			DFL			Independence			Green			Total	Source
Year	Name	Votes	%	Name	Votes	%	Name	Votes	%	Name	Votes	%	Total	Source
2002	Tim Pawlenty	999,473	43.8%	Roger Moe	821,268	36.0%	Tim Penny	364,534	16.0%	Ken Pentel	50,589	2.2%	2,282,860	
2006	Tim Pawlenty	1,028,568	46.4%	Mike Hatch	1,007,460	45.4%	Peter Hutchinson	141,735	6.4%	Ken Pentel	10,800	0.5%	2,217,818	

2018 Republican Party of Minnesota primary results
Party	Candidate	Votes	%
Republican	Jeff Johnson	168,841	52.61%
Republican	Tim Pawlenty	140,743	43.86%
Republican	Mathew Kruse	11,330	3.53%
Total votes		320,914	100.00%

== Notes ==
Minnesota House of Representatives
Preceded by Ted Winter	Majority Leader of the Minnesota House of Representatives; 1999–2003	Succeeded by Erik Paulsen
Party political offices
Preceded by Norm Coleman	Republican nominee for Governor of Minnesota; 2002, 2006	Succeeded by Tom Emmer
Political offices
Preceded by Jesse Ventura	Governor of Minnesota; 2003–2011	Succeeded by Mark Dayton
Preceded by Janet Napolitano	Chair of National Governors Association; 2007–2008	Succeeded by Ed Rendell
U.S. order of precedence (ceremonial)
Preceded by Jesse Ventura as Former Governor	Order of precedence of the United States; Within Minnesota	Succeeded by Jack Markell as Former Governor
Preceded by Jesse Ventura as Former Governor	Order of precedence of the United States; Outside Minnesota	Succeeded by Barbara Roberts as Former Governor
