= Dan Dorman =

American politician

Member of the Minnesota House of Representatives from the 27A district
- In office January 5, 1999 – January 2, 2007
- Preceded by: Ron Kraus
- Succeeded by: Robin Brown

Personal details
- Born: October 16, 1962 (age 63) Albert Lea, Minnesota
- Party: Republican Party of Minnesota
- Spouse: Mary Jo
- Children: 2
- Education: Riverland Community College; University of Minnesota
- Profession: small business owner, legislator

Dan Dorman (born October 16, 1962) is a Minnesota politician and was a member of the Minnesota House of Representatives from 1999-2007. Dorman, a Republican, who represented District 27A, which includes all or portions of Freeborn and Mower counties in the southeastern part of the state.

== Early life, education, and career ==
Dorman graduated from Albert Lea High School in 1981. From 1981-1982 he attended Riverland Community College. Dorman attended the University of Minnesota in the Minneapolis–Saint Paul metro area. He graduated in 1985 with a B.A. in Political Science. In 1988, Dorman became an active manager of Hanson Tire Service, a Goodyear Tire Retailer. He is currently the owner of the business. After his service in the Legislature, Dorman served as the executive director of the Albert Lea Economic Development Agency (Albert Lea Port Authority) from July 2007-October 2013. In 2013, Dorman became Executive Director of the Greater Minnesota Partnership, an organization focused on advocating for Greater Minnesota economic development. Dorman spends some time lobbying the Minnesota Legislature for the Partnership. Dorman also serves as a member of the boards of the Riverland Community College Foundation and the Albert Lea Community Foundation.

== Minnesota House of Representatives ==
=== Elections ===
Dorman was first elected to the House in 1998, defeating Glenville-Emmons High School Counselor Paul Moore. He was re-elected in 2000, 2002, and 2004. He decided to not run for re-election in 2006.

2004 Minnesota State Representative- House 27A
Party	Candidate	Votes	%	±%
Democratic (DFL)	Jerald Kaphers	7343	37.29	
Republican	Dan Dorman	11014	55.93	−1.44
Independence	Keith A Porter Sr.	1325	6.73	

2002 Minnesota State Representative- House 27A
Party	Candidate	Votes	%	±%
Democratic (DFL)	Allan Halvorsen	7495	42.57	
Republican	Dan Dorman	10102	57.37	−6.55

2000 Minnesota State Representative- House 27A
Party	Candidate	Votes	%	±%
Democratic (DFL)	Tony Samudio	5789	36.08	
Republican	Dan Dorman	10256	63.92	+10.72

1998 Minnesota State Representative- House 27A
Party	Candidate	Votes	%	±%
Democratic (DFL)	Paul Moore	6483	46.70	
Republican	Dan Dorman	7376	53.20	

=== Committee assignments ===
For the 84th Legislative Session, Dorman was part of the:

- Capital Investment Committee (Chair)
- Taxes Committee
- Ways and Means Committee

For the 83rd Legislative Session, Dorman was part of the:

- Commerce, Jobs, and Economic Development
- Economic Development and Tourism Division Subcommittee
- Jobs and Economic Development Finance Committee (Vice-Chair)
- Taxes Committee

For the 82nd Legislative Session, Dorman was part of the:

- Agriculture and Rural Development Finance Committee
- Agriculture and Rural Development Policy Committee
- Taxes Committee
- Sales and Income Tax Division Subcommittee

For the 81st Legislative Session, Dorman was a part of the:

- Agriculture Policy Committee
- Jobs and Economic Development Policy Committee
- Taxes Committee
- Property Taxes Division Subcommittee

=== Tenure ===
Dorman was first sworn in on January 5, 1999, serving until January 2, 2007. He served in the 81st, 82nd, 83rd, and 84th Minnesota Legislatures. Dorman was able to get the Albert Lea local option sales tax passed and secured funding for the cleanup of the closed landfill at Edgewater Park, funding for the Blazing Star Bike Trail, a grant to the City of Albert Lea for library improvements, a $500,000 grant to Freeborn County for County Road 46, and a grant to Freeman Township for improvements to the road into the Exol development park. He was also a co-author of the JOBZ legislation. Dorman was recognized five times by the Coalition of Greater Minnesota Cities for his work on behalf of Greater Minnesota, including receiving their Legacy Award when he chose not to run for re-election in 2006.

== Personal life ==
Dorman is married to his wife, Mary Jo. They have 2 kids, Chris and Matt. The Dormans reside in Albert Lea, MN. Dorman is an avid Minnesota Golden Gophers fan.

Minnesota House of Representatives
Preceded by Ron Kraus	Member of the House of Representatives from District 27A; 1999–2007	Succeeded by Robin Brown
