= Carol Molnau =

American politician

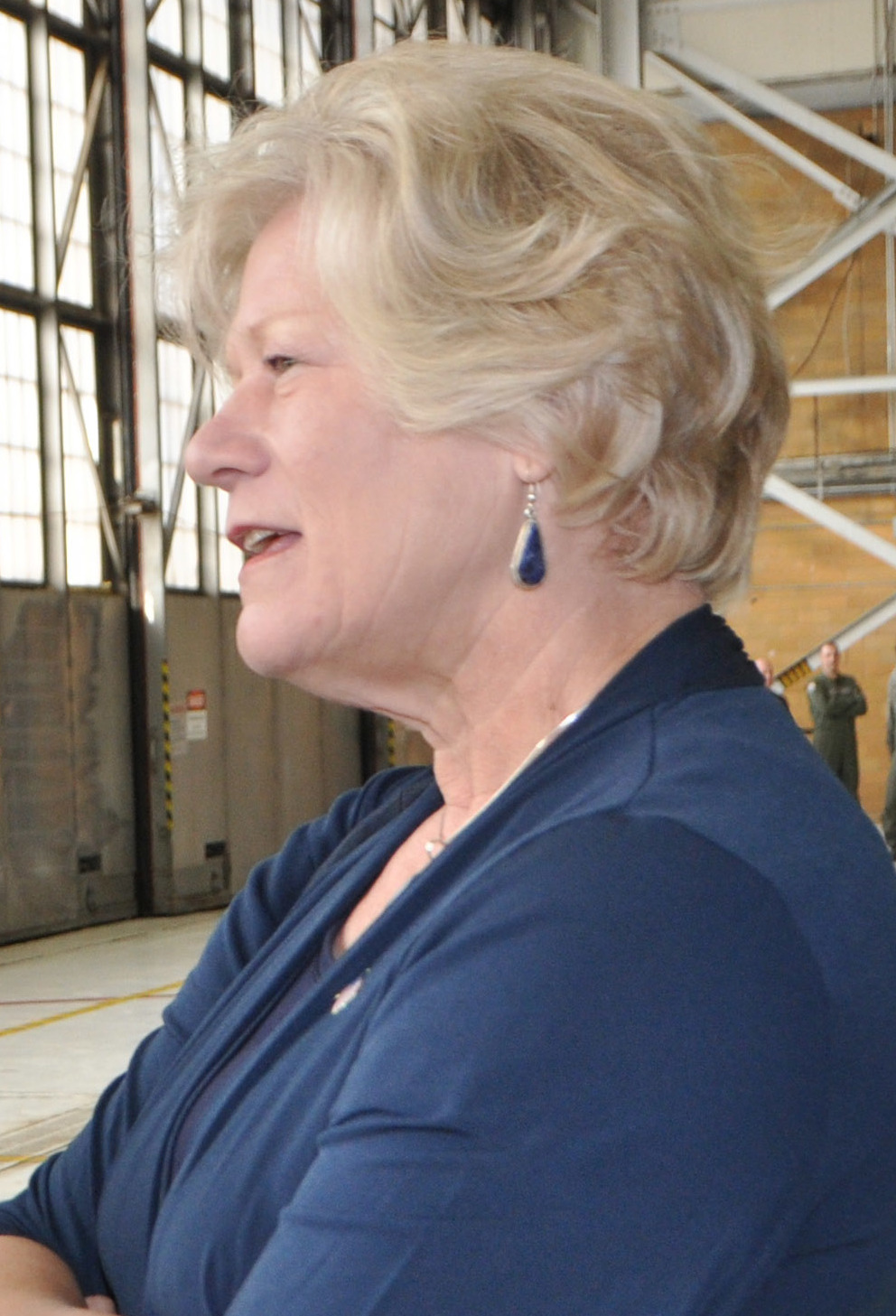

46th Lieutenant Governor of Minnesota
- In office January 6, 2003 – January 3, 2011
- Governor: Tim Pawlenty
- Preceded by: Mae Schunk
- Succeeded by: Yvonne Prettner Solon

Commissioner of the Minnesota Department of Transportation
- In office January 6, 2003 – February 28, 2008
- Governor: Tim Pawlenty
- Preceded by: Elwyn Tinklenberg
- Succeeded by: Thomas Sorel

Member of the Minnesota House of Representatives from the 35A district
- In office January 5, 1993 – January 3, 2003
- Preceded by: Redistricting
- Succeeded by: Redistricting

Personal details
- Born: September 17, 1949 (age 77) Waconia, Minnesota, U.S.
- Party: Republican
- Spouse: Steve Molnau

Carol Molnau (born September 17, 1949) is an American politician who served as the 46th lieutenant governor of Minnesota, from 2003 to 2011. As of 2026, she is the most recent Republican to have been elected Lieutenant Governor of Minnesota. (Note: Michelle Fischbach became Lt. Gov. after Tina Smith resigned in 2018, but was not elected to the office.)

Born in Carver County, Minnesota, she was elected as a member of the Minnesota House of Representatives in 1992 and served five terms. Molnau announced she would not run for re-election after she sold her farm to developers and would no longer be living in the area she had represented. She joined the Pawlenty ticket shortly thereafter, and was elected lieutenant governor in 2002 and re-elected in 2006.

She served as head of the Minnesota Department of Transportation (MNDOT) in the Pawlenty administration, where she opposed state funding of the mass transit systems of the Minneapolis–Saint Paul metropolitan area.

== Legislative Service ==
Molnau was a farmer in Chaska and served four years on its city council. She was elected to the Minnesota House of Representatives in 1992, defeating incumbent one term DFL Representative Larry Bodahl. Bodahl, previously the mayor of Waconia, had defeated longtime representative K.J. McDonald.

Molnau rose up the ranks of leadership, and served as an Assistant Minority Leader in the 1997-1998 session, and as an Assistant Majority Leader in the 1999-2000 and 2001-2002 sessions. From 1999, Molnau was the chair of the House Transportation Finance committee.

== Confirmation as MNDOT commissioner ==
The Minnesota Senate Transportation Committee voted in March 2004 to remove Molnau from her position as commissioner of MNDOT with some lawmakers citing that she lacked vision for the transportation needs of the state. The full senate later voted to confirm her. In Summer 2005, rumors began circulating that Governor Tim Pawlenty would drop Molnau from his ticket when he sought re-election in 2006, mainly because of their differences over state funding for the planned Northstar Commuter Rail linking St. Cloud and the Twin Cities. Pawlenty denied those rumors on August 1, 2005 and Molnau remained on the ticket, winning reelection on November 7, 2006. Then, in January 2007, as part of a renewed threat to remove her, Senator Steve Murphy opined that under Molnau the state's transportation infrastructure was "crumbling."

== State Highway 62 ==
In 2006, Molnau requested bids for a major highway reconstruction of Minnesota State Highway 62 and Interstate Highway 35W. Molnau's office required applicants to pay all construction projects as they did the work, with the state reimbursing the contractor over the course of the project. As a result, no contractors submitted bids and the project was shelved until new funding streams could be developed a year later.

== I-35W bridge collapse ==
In 2007 the I-35W Mississippi River bridge collapsed in Minneapolis. Molnau was unable to immediately assist in her capacity as Commissioner of Transportation because she was in China at the time. Molnau responded to complaints over her absence by stating she was presenting a paper on transportation. Subsequently some state legislators blamed her for her role as transportation commissioner for failing to advocate for robust funding of the state's transportation infrastructure, while Governor Pawlenty continued to support her. Molnau was a controversial transportation commissioner; while she does not have a college degree and said she did not read bridge inspection reports, she frequently promoted herself as a transportation expert while refusing to ask for funding to fix hundreds of problem bridges in Minnesota. She defended her leadership, citing that three members of her leadership team were engineers. The bridge that collapsed was one of those problem bridges that inspectors found to be structurally deficient. The required repairs were not made before the tragedy. A plan to strengthen the fatiguing steel trusses under the bridge was scrapped, some claim in part due to the $2 million cost of those repairs, although Mn/DOT engineers "scoffed" at the suggestion that this was a major factor in the decision. From 2003 through August 2007, Mn/DOT had reduced its staff of 4,500 by 600. Her critics claim that her focus was on new roads—not maintenance of existing ones. In September 2007 the Minneapolis Star-Tribune reported that Molnau's Director of Emergency Response was attending a class at Harvard on Emergency Response. The Director did not return when the bridge collapsed, and proceeded to spend several days in Washington, DC before returning to Minnesota over a week later. The Director was terminated after the outcome of an investigation by the State's Legislative Auditor and the Department of Transportation.

== Removal as transportation commissioner ==
After the Interstate 35W bridge collapse some lawmakers publicly questioned her dual role as lieutenant governor and transportation commissioner. However, Molnau defended her roles, citing her predecessor, Mae Schunk, who was active in education throughout the state.

Fallout from the I-35W bridge collapse was evident in a January 2008 Minnesota Public Radio/Humphrey Institute poll, with only one in four Minnesotans approving of the job she was doing as Mn/DOT commissioner. State Senator Steve Murphy responded by saying that the Minnesota Senate would remove her if she does not step down from her post as Mn/DOT chief.

On February 28, 2008, Molnau was removed from her position as transportation commissioner by the State Senate by a party-line, 44–22 vote. Pawlenty considered her ouster a disappointing partisan move while legislators saw failures of leadership and management.

=== Molnau's farm sale ===
In addition to the criticism following the I-35W bridge collapse, Molnau was also criticized for the sale of her family's farm in 2000 near a highway improvement project she helped put on a fast track. Then-state Rep. Carol Molnau and her husband Steve Molnau sold a 40-acre (160,000 m^{2}) parcel of land for 3.3 million dollars near the Highway 212 project she had backed passed through the House of Representatives. Although the official sale date was May 23, 2000, 8 days after then-governor Jesse Ventura signed the Highway 212 project bill, Molnau stated that the sale had been in negotiations for several months. Additionally, a Carver County clerk stated that the sale date as recorded reflected the actual date of the sale, not the day of the real estate closing or the filing date.

== See also ==
- List of female lieutenant governors in the United States

Party political offices
Preceded by Gen Olson	Republican nominee for Lieutenant Governor of Minnesota; 2002, 2006	Succeeded by Annette Meeks
Political offices
Preceded by Mae Schunk	Lieutenant Governor of Minnesota; 2003–2011	Succeeded by Yvonne Prettner Solon
