= Peggy Bennett =

American politician (born 1958)

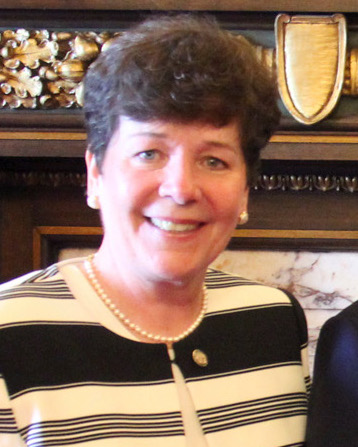

Member of the Minnesota House of Representatives
- Incumbent
- Assumed office January 6, 2015
- Preceded by: Shannon Savick
- Succeeded by: Nick Ronnenberg (elect)
- Constituency: District 27A (2015–2023); District 23A (2023–present)

Personal details
- Born: July 3, 1958 (age 68) White Bear Lake, Minnesota, U.S.
- Party: Republican
- Education: Crown College (BA); St. Cloud State University MA)
- Website: State House website Campaign website

Peggy Bennett (born July 3, 1958) is an American politician serving in the Minnesota House of Representatives since 2015. A member of the Republican Party of Minnesota, Bennett represents District 23A in southern Minnesota, which includes the city of Albert Lea and parts of Faribault, Freeborn, Steele and Waseca Counties.

== Early life, education, and career ==
Bennett grew up in White Bear Lake, Minnesota. She graduated from Mound Westonka High School in Mound, Minnesota; from Crown College in St. Bonifacius, Minnesota, with a Bachelor of Arts in education; and from St. Cloud State University in 1981 with a Master of Arts in special education.

Before entering politics, Bennett was a first-grade public school teacher in Albert Lea for 33 years.

== Minnesota House of Representatives ==
Bennett was elected to the Minnesota House of Representatives in 2014, and has been reelected every two years since. She defeated one-term DFL incumbent Shannon Savick, criticizing Savick and Democrats for raising taxes. During the 2016 Republican Presidential Primary, Bennett joined two dozen state lawmakers in endorsing Florida Senator Marco Rubio.

Bennett is the minority lead on the Education Policy Committee and serves on the Education Finance and Veterans and Military Affairs Finance and Policy Committees. From 2015-16, Bennett served as vice chair of the Education Innovation Policy Committee. She was an assistant minority leader from 2019 to 2022.

=== Education ===
Bennett has called for more local control in education decisions. She opposed efforts to provide free meals to all school children, regardless of family income, calling it a "shotgun approach". She supported a bill that would speed up the licensing process for substitute teachers in response to workforce shortages caused by the COVID-19 pandemic, arguing that DFL proposals didn't go far enough. Bennett has spoken against bills to increase recruitment of teachers of color.

=== Other political positions ===
In 2018, Bennett authored legislation that passed unanimously creating a "sibling bill of rights" to help children in the foster care system avoid being separated from their siblings. She supported legislation increasing penalties on distracted driving and on protestors that block freeways. Bennett has been in contact and worked directly with an anti-LGBTQ group in Minnesota, the "Child Protection League." She has opposed proposals to raise the gas tax to pay for roads and bridges improvements. Bennett stated she carries a handgun while at the State Capitol.

Bennett led House Republican opposition of the Mayo Clinic for its vaccine mandate policy for employees, calling for a halt in state funding for health care facilities that fire employees "due to unrealistic vaccine mandate policies".

== Electoral history ==
2014 Minnesota State House - District 27A
Party	Candidate	Votes	%
Republican	Peggy Bennett	8,155	53.04
Democratic (DFL)	Shannon Savick (incumbent)	6,139	39.93
Independence	Thomas Keith Price	1,066	6.93
Write-in		14	0.09
Total votes		15,374	100.0
Republican gain from Democratic (DFL)			

2016 Minnesota State House - District 27A
Party	Candidate	Votes	%
Republican	Peggy Bennett (incumbent)	12,329	61.71
Democratic (DFL)	Gary Schindler	7,633	38.21
Write-in		17	0.09
Total votes		19,979	100.0
Republican hold			

2018 Minnesota State House - District 27A
Party	Candidate	Votes	%
Republican	Peggy Bennett (incumbent)	9,957	56.52
Democratic (DFL)	Terry Gjersvik	7,651	43.43
Write-in		9	0.05
Total votes		17,617	100.0
Republican hold			

2020 Minnesota State House - District 27A
Party	Candidate	Votes	%
Republican	Peggy Bennett (incumbent)	13,416	63.43
Democratic (DFL)	Thomas Martinez	7,719	36.49
Write-in		16	0.08
Total votes		21,151	100.0
Republican hold			

2022 Minnesota State House - District 23A
Party	Candidate	Votes	%
Republican	Peggy Bennett (incumbent)	12,038	65.75
Democratic (DFL)	Mary Hinnenkamp	6,252	34.15
Write-in		19	0.10
Total votes		18,309	100.0
Republican hold			

2024 Minnesota State House - District 23A
Party	Candidate	Votes	%
Republican	Peggy Bennett (incumbent)	15,554	67.75
Democratic (DFL)	Joe Staloch	7,379	32.14
Write-in		26	0.11
Total votes		22,959	100.0
Republican hold			

== Personal life ==
Bennett is single, and resides in Albert Lea, Minnesota.
