= Unallotment =

Budgetary technique

Unallotment is a budgetary technique used by United States state governors to unilaterally make spending cuts to bridge budget deficit gaps, most notably by Minnesota Governor Tim Pawlenty in July 2009.

== Unallotment in Minnesota ==
In Minnesota, in order for unallotment to be used, all of the following circumstances must exist:

- A balanced budget has been enacted into law
- Expected revenues have been determined to be less than anticipated
- The governor has approved the unallotment
- The commissioner has sought advice from the Legislative Advisory Committee
- The budget reserve has been exhausted

If all of these conditions exist, the executive branch is given broad authority to cut state budgets without the consent of the state legislature.

== Use ==
In July 2009, Governor Tim Pawlenty used his unallotment authority to cut $33 million of the Minnesota state budget. This resulted in the budgets for most government agencies in Minnesota being cut by as much as 2.25%. In doing this, Pawlenty proclaimed that he would not ask the legislature to approve the unallotment cuts: “The legislators are gone, and they’re not coming back”. The response from some Democratic Minnesota legislators was to take steps to curtail the governor's unallotment power through legislation that would limit or repeal the governor's unallotment authority. Pawlenty indicated that he would veto any such legislation in a letter to Democratic legislators.

== Court ruling on unallotment ==
The issue of the unallotment statute in Minnesota was heard by the Minnesota State Supreme Court in the case of Brayton et al. v. Pawlenty, et al. In a 4-3 majority opinion written by Chief Justice Eric Magnuson, a Pawlenty appointee as well as the governor's former law partner, the court ruled that Pawlenty eliminated money for the program before the budget process had been completed. The ruling said, in part: “The unallotment statute provides the executive branch with authority to address an unanticipated deficit that arises after the legislative and executive branches have enacted a balanced budget. The statute does not shift to the executive branch a broad budget-making authority allowing the executive branch to address a deficit that remains after a legislative session because the legislative and executive branches have not resolved their differences. Because the legislative and executive branches never enacted a balanced budget for the 2010-2011 biennium, use of the unallotment power to address the unresolved deficit exceeded the authority granted to the executive branch by the statute. We therefore affirm the district court’s conclusion that the unallotment of the [nutrition program] funds was unlawful and void.”

The ruling in the Brayton case did not address the constitutionality of the unallotment statute; only that Gov. Pawlenty had violated the unallotment statute with his actions. Many critics of unallotment have doubts about the constitutionality of the unallotment authority, arguing that unallotment is a violation of separation of powers under Minnesota's constitution.

== Unallotment reform ==
After the unallotment fight in Minnesota's Supreme Court, the Minnesota House of Representatives passed a bill altering the governor's unallotment powers in May 2010. The legislation caps the amount a governor can unallot from the general fund budget to 2% in addition to prohibiting the governor from eliminating entire programs using unallotment.

== See also ==
- Line-item veto in the United States
