= Robin Brown (politician) =

American politician (born 1961)

Member of the Minnesota House of Representatives from the 27A district
- In office January 3, 2007 – January 3, 2011
- Preceded by: Dan Dorman
- Succeeded by: Rich Murray

Personal details
- Born: April 22, 1961 (age 65)
- Party: Minnesota Democratic-Farmer-Labor Party
- Spouse(s): Joseph Eugene Brown, Senior
- Children: 6
- Education: Minnesota State University, Mankato; St. Mary's University
- Profession: educator, legislator

Robin K. Brown (born April 22, 1961) is a Minnesota politician and a former member of the Minnesota House of Representatives (2007-2011) A member of the Minnesota Democratic-Farmer-Labor Party (DFL), she represented District 27A, which includes all or portions of Freeborn and Mower counties in the southeastern part of the state.

== Early life, education, and career ==
Brown was raised on a farm and was the oldest of eight children. She graduated from Montezuma High School in Montezuma, Iowa, attended Lycoming College in Williamsport, PA and then went on to Minnesota State University, Mankato in Mankato, receiving her B.A. in Art Education. In 2006, she earned her M.A. in Education from St. Mary's University in Winona. Brown is an art and photography teacher at Albert Lea High School in Albert Lea. She is also a Horse Breeder. She is Owner and Operator of Wedgewood Peruvian Pasos.

== Minnesota House of Representatives ==
=== Elections ===
Brown was first elected in 2006, and was re-elected in 2008. She was unseated by Republican Rich Murray in her 2010 re-election bid, losing by a mere 57 votes after an election recount.

2010 Minnesota State Representative- House 27A
Party	Candidate	Votes	%	±%
Democratic (DFL)	Robin Brown (Incumbent)	7454	49.77	
Republican	Rich Murray	7511	50.15	

2008 Minnesota State Representative- House 27A
Party	Candidate	Votes	%	±%
Democratic (DFL)	Robin Brown (Incumbent)	10960	57.65	
Republican	Erik Larson	8031	42.24	

2006 Minnesota State Representative- House 27A
Party	Candidate	Votes	%	±%
Democratic (DFL)	Robin Brown	8617	50.78	
Republican	Matt Benda	8332	49.10	

=== Tenure ===
She was a member of the House Commerce and Labor Subcommittee for the Telecommunications Regulation and Infrastructure Division, and of the Finance subcommittees for the Agriculture, Rural Economies and Veterans Affairs Finance Division, the Cultural and Outdoor Resources Finance Division, and the K-12 Education Finance Division.

== Personal life ==
Brown resides in Moscow Township, Minnesota. Her husband, Joseph "Joe" Brown is a former Iowa State Senator who represented the old 27th and 35th districts in that state from 1979-1987. Brown has 6 children (3 from a previous marriage): Nathaniel, Crystal, Earnest, Jeb, Bristen, and Madison. In her spare time, Brown enjoys horseback riding and painting.
