= Julie Sabo =

American politician and educator

Member of the Minnesota Senate from the 62nd district
- In office January 2, 2001 – January 7, 2003
- Preceded by: Carol Flynn
- Succeeded by: Wes Skoglund

Personal details
- Born: Julie Ann Sabo; March 18, 1966 (age 60) Minneapolis, Minnesota, U.S.
- Party: Democratic
- Relations: Martin Olav Sabo (father)
- Education: Augsburg College (BA)

Julie Ann Sabo (born March 18, 1966) is an American politician and educator who served as a member of the Minnesota Senate from 2001 to 2003. Sabo was also the Democratic nominee for lieutenant governor of Minnesota in the 2002 Minnesota gubernatorial election.

== Background ==
A native of Minneapolis, Minnesota, Sabo received her bachelor's degree from Augsburg College and worked as a school teacher. Her father is Martin Olav Sabo. Sabo served in the Minnesota Senate from 2001 to 2003 as a Democrat.

Party political offices
Preceded by Roger Moe	Democratic nominee for Lieutenant Governor of Minnesota; 2002	Succeeded by Judi Dutcher
