= Martin Olav Sabo =

American politician (1938–2016)

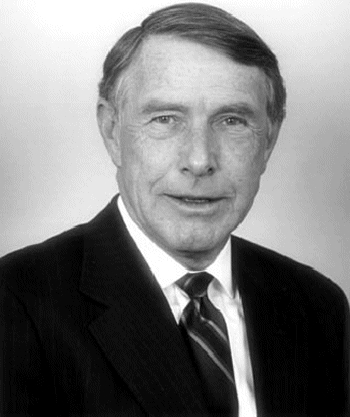

Member of the U.S. House of Representatives from Minnesota's 5th district
- In office January 3, 1979 – January 3, 2007
- Preceded by: Donald M. Fraser
- Succeeded by: Keith Ellison
House positions
Chair of the House Budget Committee
In office January 3, 1993 – January 3, 1995
Preceded by	Leon Panetta
Succeeded by	John Kasich
Ranking Member of the House Budget Committee
In office January 3, 1995 – January 3, 1997
Preceded by	John Kasich
Succeeded by	John Spratt

46th Speaker of the Minnesota House of Representatives
- In office 1973–1979
- Preceded by: Aubrey W. Dirlam
- Succeeded by: Rod Searle

Member of the Minnesota House of Representatives
- In office 1961–1978

President of the National Conference of State Legislatures
- In office 1976–1977
- Preceded by: Tom Jensen
- Succeeded by: Fred Anderson

Personal details
- Born: February 28, 1938 Crosby, North Dakota, U.S.
- Died: March 13, 2016 (aged 78) Minneapolis, Minnesota, U.S.
- Resting place: Lakewood Cemetery
- Party: Democratic
- Spouse: Sylvia Ann Lee
- Children: 2, including Julie Sabo
- Education: Augsburg College

Martin Olav Sabo (February 28, 1938 – March 13, 2016) was an American politician who served as United States Representative for Minnesota's fifth district, which includes Minneapolis; the district is one of eight congressional districts in Minnesota.

== Early life and education ==
Sabo was born in Crosby, North Dakota, the son of Lutheran Norwegian immigrant parents. He received a B.A. from Augsburg College in Minneapolis in 1959, later pursuing graduate studies at the University of Minnesota.

== Career ==
=== Minnesota Legislature ===
He was elected to the Minnesota House of Representatives in 1960 at the age of 22, later serving as minority leader (1969–72) and as the first Democrat to serve as house speaker (1973–78). During his tenure in the state house he served terms as president of the National Conference of State Legislatures and of the National Legislative Conference, and was a presidential appointee to the National Advisory Commission on Intergovernmental Relations.

=== U.S. Congress ===
When eight-term incumbent and fellow Democratic–Farmer–Labor Party (DFL) member Donald M. Fraser stepped down to run for the U.S. Senate, Sabo became the DFL candidate to succeed him in what had become the most reliably Democratic district in Minnesota (Fraser had defeated a 10-term Republican in 1962 and hadn't faced serious opposition since). He won easily in November 1978 and was reelected thirteen times without serious opposition, serving in the 96th, 97th, 98th, 99th, 100th, 101st, 102nd, 103rd, 104th, 105th, 106th, 107th, 108th and 109th congresses.

During the 103rd Congress (1993–94) he chaired the House Budget Committee. As chairman of the Committee, he shepherded the Omnibus Budget Reconciliation Act of 1993 through the House, legislation that allowed the United States to erase its budget deficit by 1999. (The deficit subsequently returned.) In the 109th United States Congress he sat on the House Appropriations Committee, and was the ranking member of that committee's Homeland Security subcommittee.

A Lutheran, Sabo was married and had two children and six grandchildren. His daughter, Julie Sabo, is a former member of the Minnesota Senate and was the 2002 DFL nominee for Lieutenant Governor of Minnesota. Sabo was inducted into the Scandinavian-American Hall of Fame in 1994. During the course of his career Sabo referred to himself as a "liberal decentrist", preferring progressive politics, but local control instead of federal control.

Sabo was considered to be the most liberal member of the Minnesota delegation in the 109th Congress, scoring 4% conservative by a conservative group and 90% progressive by a liberal group.

=== Later career ===
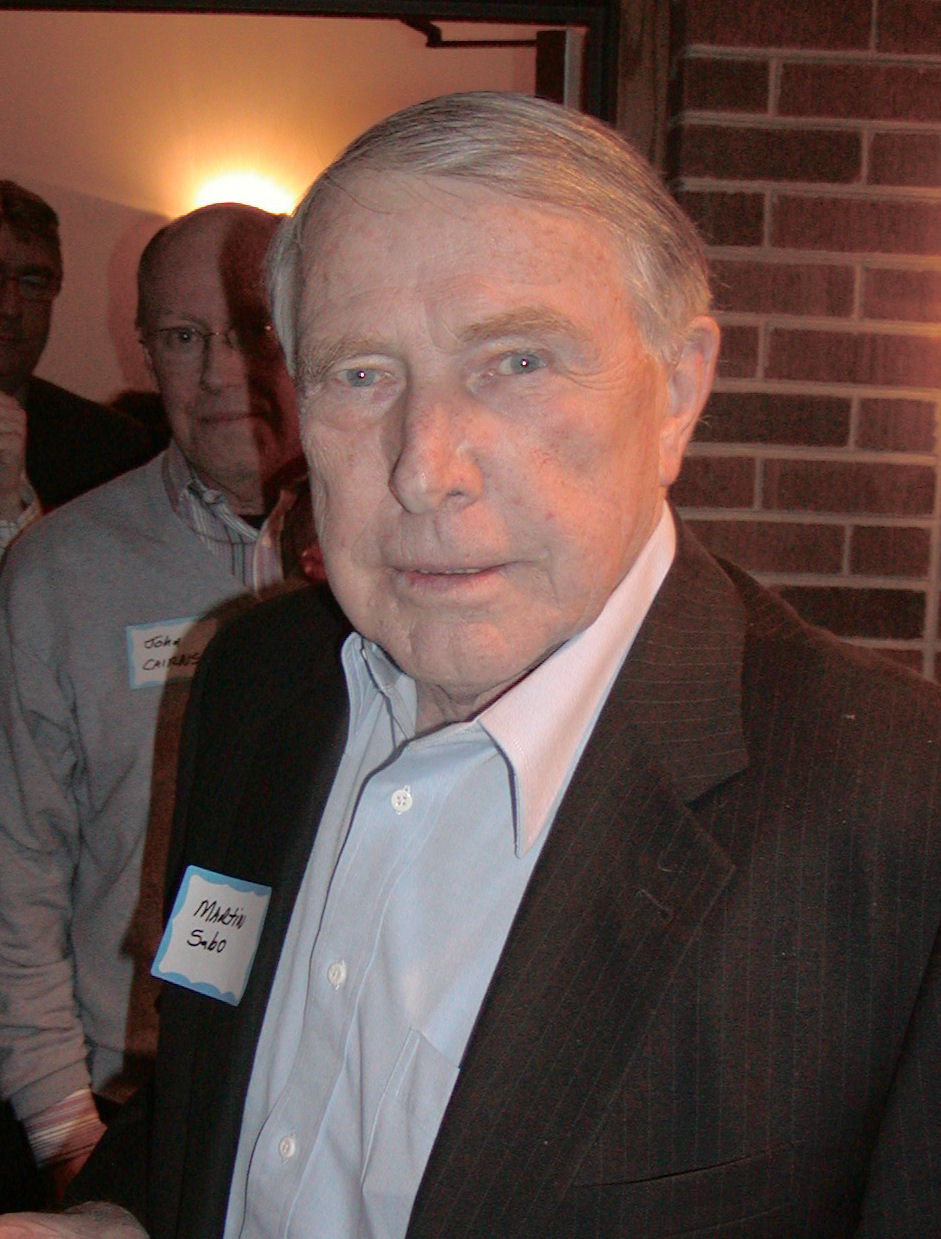
Sabo in 2009

On March 18, 2006, he announced that he would not seek reelection for the 110th Congress, ending 46 years as an elected official, including 28 years in Congress – the third-longest tenure in either house of Congress in the state's history, behind only fellow Democrats Jim Oberstar and Collin Peterson. He endorsed his longtime chief of staff Mike Erlandson in the DFL primary—the real contest in this district. Erlandson lost to State Representative Keith Ellison, also a progressive DFLer, who in turn won the general election and succeeded Sabo on January 4, 2007.

Sabo served as a co-chair of the National Transportation Policy Project at the Bipartisan Policy Center. For his work on acquiring funding for transportation projects and specifically pedestrian and bicycling funding, the Midtown Greenway bridge in Minneapolis was named the Martin Olav Sabo Bridge. In 2022, the central Minneapolis post office was renamed the Martin Olav Sabo Post Office.

== Personal life ==
Sabo was hospitalized with breathing difficulties. He died on March 13, 2016, in Minneapolis, Minnesota, at the age of 78. He is buried in Lakewood Cemetery.

U.S Senator Amy Klobuchar called Sabo a "friend and mentor," and Governor Mark Dayton praised him as "a great political leader and an outstanding public servant." Sabo was a lifelong smoker until he quit in 2003.

== Electoral history ==
- 2004 race for U.S. House of Representatives – 5th district
  - Martin Olav Sabo (DFL) (inc.), 70%
  - Daniel Mathias (R), 24%
  - Jay Pond (G), 6%

U.S. House of Representatives
Preceded by Donald M. Fraser	Member of the U.S. House of Representatives from Minnesota's 5th congressional district 1979–2007	Succeeded by Keith Ellison
Political offices
Preceded by Leon Panetta; California	Chairman of the House Budget Committee; 1993–1995	Succeeded by John Kasich; Ohio
Preceded by Aubrey W. Dirlam	Speaker of the Minnesota House of Representatives; 1973–1979	Succeeded by Rodney N. Searle
