= Tim Penny =

American politician (born 1951)

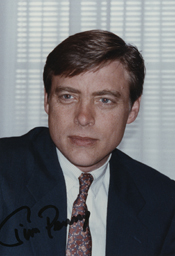

Member of the U.S. House of Representatives from Minnesota's 1st district
- In office January 3, 1983 – January 3, 1995
- Preceded by: Arlen Erdahl
- Succeeded by: Gil Gutknecht

Member of the Minnesota Senate from the 30th district
- In office January 4, 1977 – January 3, 1983
- Preceded by: John Patton
- Succeeded by: Mel Frederick

Personal details
- Born: Timothy Joe Penny; November 19, 1951 (age 74) Albert Lea, Minnesota, U.S.
- Party: Democratic (before 2002); Independence (2002–2025)
- Children: 4
- Education: Winona State University (BA); University of Minnesota

Timothy Joe Penny (born November 19, 1951) is an American author, musician, and former politician from Minnesota. As a member of the Democratic-Farmer-Labor Party, Penny represented Minnesota's 1st congressional district in the United States House of Representatives from 1983 to 1995. Penny was also the Independence Party's nominee for governor of Minnesota in 2002.

== Early life ==
Penny was born in Albert Lea, Minnesota, and was educated at Winona State College, receiving a bachelor's degree in political science in 1974. He was a member of the Minnesota Senate, 1976–1982. Penny served in the United States Naval Reserve and was commissioned a lieutenant commander.

== Political career ==
In 1982, Penny won the DFL nomination for the 1st District and upset four-term 2nd District Republican Tom Hagedorn, becoming only the third Democrat to represent this district. Leading up to the election, Republicans were divided after the conservative Hagedorn narrowly defeated two-term First District moderate incumbent, Rep. Arlen Erdahl, in a contentious Republican Convention endorsement contest after redistricting; in addition, Democrats made large gains in congressional elections across the country, which contributed to Penny's victory. Penny was reelected in 1984 with 56 percent of the vote, becoming the first non-Republican to win reelection in the district since statehood. He never faced another contest nearly that close, winning four more times by an average of 70 percent of the vote.

Penny was a somewhat conservative Democrat; he opposed gun control and abortion (though he has since become pro-choice). These stances were typical for a mostly rural district in southern Minnesota. He was best known for his work on fiscal policy. Although he had built a nearly unbreakable hold on his district, he announced in 1994 that he would not run for a seventh term. After Jesse Ventura was elected governor in 1998, Penny served an informal advisory role to the governor and assisted with the gubernatorial transition team.

== 2002 Minnesota gubernatorial election ==
Governor Ventura decided not to stand for reelection in 2002. In July of that year, Penny joined the Independence Party and presented himself as a "sensible center", which resulted in winning the Independence nomination. Polls indicated a dead heat between him, DFL candidate Roger Moe, and Republican candidate Tim Pawlenty less than a month before the election. His running mate for the election was state senator Martha Robertson of Minnetonka, a moderate Republican. Polls in October had Penny in a near threeway tie. In the end, Penny was unsuccessful in his campaign, finishing with 16% of the vote.

== Electoral history ==
2002 Minnesota gubernatorial election
Party	Candidate	Votes	%	±%
Republican	Tim Pawlenty	999,473	44.37%	+10.1%
Democratic (DFL)	Roger Moe	821,268	36.46%	+6.4%
Independence	Tim Penny	364,534	16.18%	−20.8%
Green	Ken Pentel	50,589	2.25%	+2.0%
Independent	Booker Hodges IV	9,698	0.43%	+0.4%
Socialist Workers	Kari Sachs	3,026	0.14%	+0.09%
Constitution	Lawrence Aeshliman	2,537	0.11%	+0.1%
	Lealand Vettleson	2	0.00%	+0.0%
	Write-ins	1,348	0.06%	+0.02%
Majority		178,205	7.91%	
Turnout		2,252,473	70.7%	+10.6%
Republican gain from Independence				

== Post-Congressional career ==
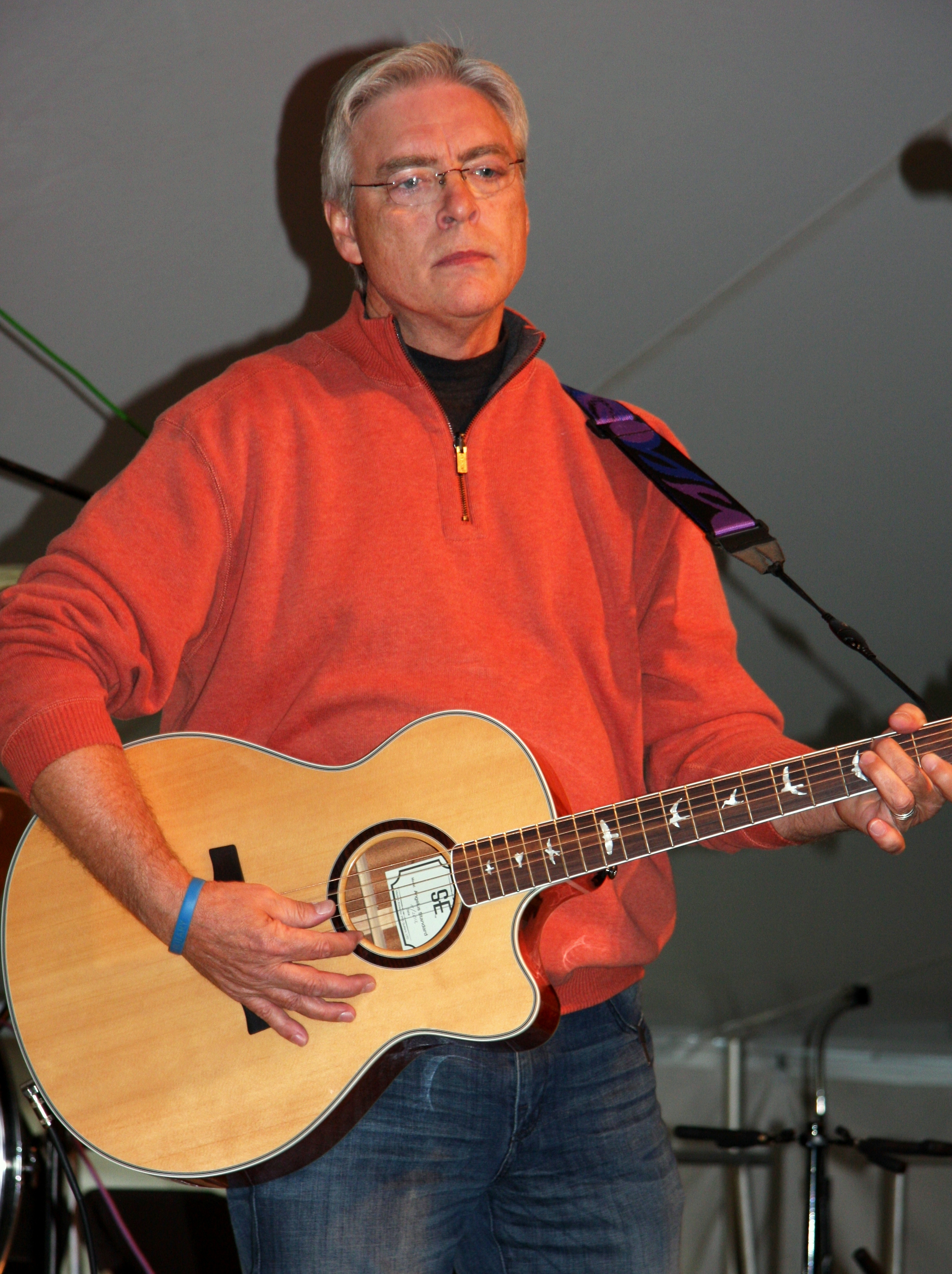
Penny performing in 2014

In 2008, he endorsed Republican John McCain for president and Independence Party candidate former senator Dean Barkley for US Senate.

Penny is president of the Southern Minnesota Initiative Foundation. He is also a senior fellow at the University of Minnesota's Humphrey Institute. He served for a time as the institute's co-director alongside one of his former congressional colleagues, Republican Vin Weber.

He serves on the advisory board of the Institute for Law and Politics at the University of Minnesota Law School and is on the board of directors for the Energy Literacy Advocates. Penny also serves as vice chairman of the board of directors of ACDI/VOCA, a nonprofit U.S. international development organization. In addition, he is a co-chair of the Committee for a Responsible Federal Budget.

== Personal life ==
Penny lives in Owatonna, Minnesota and has four adult children. He is the lead singer and guitarist in a band called Led Penny. He was known to perform during his campaigns, including a performance of Take Me Home, Country Roads during his 1986 re-election campaign.

== Writings ==
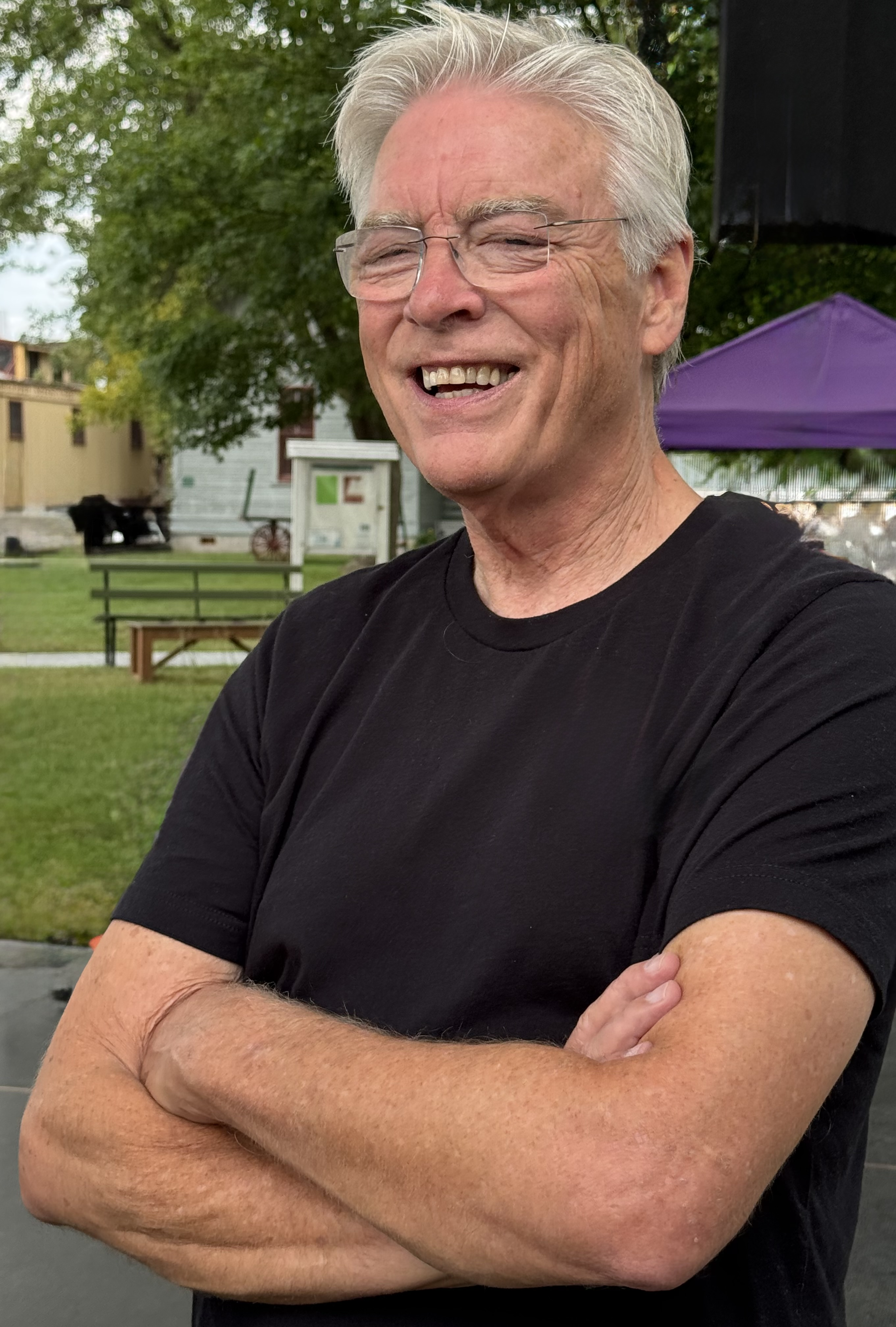
Penny in 2025

Penny is the co-author of three books, Payment Due (1996), Common Cents: A Retiring Six-Term Congressman Reveals How Congress Really Works — And What We Must Do to Fix It (1995), and The 15 Biggest Lies in Politics (1998). He is the lead author of "The Road to Generational Equity", a manifesto that political analyst John Avlon characterizes as radical centrist.

== Notes ==
U.S. House of Representatives
Preceded by Arlen Erdahl	Member of the U.S. House of Representatives from Minnesota's 1st congressional district 1983–1995	Succeeded by Gil Gutknecht
Party political offices
New office	Chair of the House Democratic Mainstream Forum; 1990–1995; Served alongside: Dave McCurdy	Position abolished
Preceded by Jesse Ventura	Independence nominee for Governor of Minnesota; 2002	Succeeded by Peter Hutchinson
U.S. order of precedence (ceremonial)
Preceded by Vin Weber as Former U.S. Representative	Order of precedence of the United States as Former U.S. Representative	Succeeded by Gil Gutknecht as Former U.S. Representative
