= Norman J. Larson =

American politician (1902–1999)

Norman J. Larson (December 26, 1902 – January 14, 1999) was an American businessman, educator, and politician.

Larson was born in Borup, Norman County, Minnesota. He moved to Ada, Minnesota, with his family, in 1907, and graduated from Ada High School in 1922. Larson went to MacPhail Center for Music in Minneapolis, Minnesota, to University of Michigan, and to St. Olaf College. Larson lived in Ada, Minnesota with his wife and family and was involved in the automobile and implement business. He was also the band director of the Michigan Marching Band, University of Michigan, Ann Arbor, Michigan in 1925 and 1926. Larson served in the United States Army during World War II. Larson served in the Minnesota Senate from 1939 to 1970.
