= Judi Dutcher =

American politician and lawyer

16th Auditor of Minnesota
- In office January 3, 1995 – January 6, 2003
- Governor: Arne Carlson; Jesse Ventura
- Preceded by: Mark Dayton
- Succeeded by: Patricia Anderson

Personal details
- Born: November 27, 1962 (age 63) Michigan, U.S.
- Party: Republican (until 2000); Democratic-Farmer-Labor (after 2000)
- Profession: Attorney, philanthropist

Judith H. Dutcher (born November 27, 1962) is an American attorney and former politician who served as the Minnesota State Auditor from 1995 to 2003 as both a Republican and Democrat (DFL). She was the first woman to serve as Minnesota State Auditor.

== Life and career ==
Judi Dutcher was born in Michigan in 1962. Her father, Jim Dutcher, was the head basketball coach of the University of Minnesota from the mid-1970s to mid-1980s. She received a B.A. in Political Science and in English Literature from the University of Minnesota in 1984, and her J.D. degree from the Law School in 1987.

After practicing as a prosecutor in the Twin Cities for several years, and serving as a referee in Hennepin County Conciliation Court, then-Governor Arne Carlson, approached her about running for state auditor as a member of the then Independent Republican Party in 1994 (the state Republican party was known as the Independent Republican Party from November 1975 to September 1995). Dutcher had previously not been a member of either party.

However, she accepted, and ran in the Arne Carlson mold of a centrist Republican; liberal on social issues, and conservative on fiscal issues. She won the Republican Party nomination for Auditor, and in November 1994, became the first pregnant woman ever elected to statewide office in the United States.

Dutcher gained recognition for her office's special investigations into malfeasance and was reelected in 1998, receiving more votes than any other candidate for constitutional office in Minnesota that year. In January 2000, she announced that she was switching to the DFL party, saying that she felt uncomfortable as a pro-choice on abortion, pro-gay rights woman in the Republican Party. She was given a speaking slot at the 2000 Democratic National Convention in Los Angeles, and supported Vice President Al Gore and Senator Joe Lieberman.

In 2001, Dutcher announced that she was creating an exploratory committee to run for Governor of Minnesota. She entered the race in early 2002, with State Senator Becky Lourey as her main opponent for the DFL endorsement. State Senate Majority Leader Roger Moe entered the race a few months later, setting up a three-way-fight for the DFL endorsement. At the convention, Lourey dropped out after the second round of balloting and endorsed Dutcher. However, Dutcher did not have the support of 60% of the delegates needed for the endorsement, and Roger Moe had the momentum after several more rounds of balloting. Dutcher withdrew her bid for governor, and endorsed Moe. Dutcher decided not to seek reelection to the auditors office, and rejected calls from the Independence Party of Minnesota to run under their banner. Dutcher's term as auditor expired in January 2003. Roger Moe lost the governor's race to Tim Pawlenty in November 2002.

Currently, Dutcher is the CEO of the Bentson Foundation. It is a Tax-Exempt Charitable Corporation started in 1956 by Larry and Nancy Bentson.

== 2006 campaign for lieutenant governor ==
Dutcher had disclaimed interest in running for office again, but had created speculation that Minnesota Attorney General Mike Hatch would choose her as his running mate for Lieutenant Governor after she strongly endorsed him and spoke on his behalf at the 2006 DFL state convention. Perhaps not surprisingly, Hatch named her as his running mate on June 25, 2006.

In the final stage of the campaign, Dutcher made headlines for a political gaffe in which she responded to then KSAX-TV reporter Corey Poppe's question on E85 ethanol by saying "What's E85?" Hatch attributed part of his loss to that remark, noting that he lost heavily in southern Minnesota counties where E85 production facilities are located. However, Hatch later regretted the comment attributing the loss to the E85 comment, and he took responsibility for the loss. The Star Tribune and WCCO TV made separate analyses of the comment, and found that it had little impact on the race. However, the gaffe did lead to Hatch calling a reporter a "Republican whore" a few days later, which dominated the news cycle leading up to the election.

== Electoral history ==
- 2006 campaign for Governor/Lt. Governor – General Election
  - Tim Pawlenty/Carol Molnau (R), 1,028,568 (46.69%)
  - Mike Hatch/Judi Dutcher (DFL), 1,007,460 (45.73%)
  - Peter Hutchinson/Maureen Reed (I), 141,735 (6.43%)
- 1998 campaign for State Auditor – General Election
  - Judi Dutcher (R), 968,132 (49.06%)
  - Nancy A. Larson (DFL), 812,892 (41.20%)
  - Patricia G.V. Becker (USTP), 116,578 (5.91%)
  - Bob Odden (L), 40,228 (2.04%)
  - Joseph G. Peschek (PM), 33,507 (1.7%)
- 1994 campaign for State Auditor – General Election
  - Judi Dutcher (R), 836,626 (49.62%)
  - Donald M. Moe (DFL), 768,630 (45.59%)
  - Steven Anderson (GRTS), 80,811 (4.79%)
- 1994 campaign for State Auditor – Republican Primary
  - Judi Dutcher, 100,908 (28.07%)
  - David A. P. Anderson, 77,265 (21.49%)
  - Don Koenig, 69,571 (19.35%)
  - James J. Wagner, 61,809 (17.19%)
  - Nick Tretinyak, Jr., 25,414 (7.07%)
  - Jual Carlos Carlson, 24,539 (6.83%)

Party political offices
Preceded by Bob Heinrich	Republican nominee for Minnesota State Auditor; 1994, 1998	Succeeded by Patricia Anderson
Preceded by Julie Sabo	Democratic nominee for Lieutenant Governor of Minnesota; 2006	Succeeded by Yvonne Prettner Solon
Political offices
Preceded by Mark Dayton	State Auditor of Minnesota; 1995–2003	Succeeded by Patricia Anderson
