= 2010 United States House of Representatives elections in Minnesota =

- November 2, 2010

All 8 Minnesota seats to the United States House of Representatives
	Majority party	Minority party
Party	Democratic (DFL)	Republican
Last election	5 seats, 57.53%	3 seats, 38.14%
Seats before	5	3
Seats won	4	4
Seat change	▼1	▲1
Popular vote	1,002,026	970,741
Percentage	47.93%	46.43%
Swing	▼9.60%	▲8.29%

Democratic hold
Republican hold Republican gain
Democratic
40–50%
50–60%
60–70%
70–80%
Republican
40–50%
50–60%
60–70%
70–80%

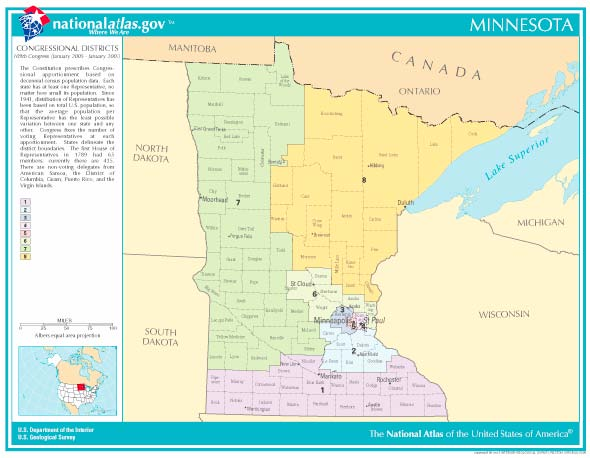
Map of Minnesota showing all eight districts

The 2010 Minnesota U.S. House of Representatives elections took place on November 2, 2010. All eight congressional seats in the state's delegation were contested. Representatives are elected for two-year terms; those elected served in the 112th United States Congress from January 3, 2011, until January 3, 2013.

The 2010 Minnesota gubernatorial, 2010 Minnesota House elections and 2010 Minnesota Senate elections occurred on the same date, as well as many local elections and ballot initiatives.

The 111th congressional delegation from the U.S. state of Minnesota had five Democratic Farmer Labor Party members (DFLers) and 3 Republicans. All the incumbents were reelected except District 8's Jim Oberstar, who was defeated in his bid for a 19th term. This left Minnesota with an equal number of Democratic and Republican representatives.

== Overview ==
=== Statewide ===
The table below shows the total number and percentage of votes, as well as the number of seats gained and lost by each political party in the election for the United States House of Representatives in Minnesota.

Party	Candidates	Votes		Seats		
Party	Candidates	No.	%	No.	+/–	%
Democratic-Farmer-Labor	8	1,002,026	47.93	4	▼1	50.00
Republican	8	970,741	46.43	4	▲1	50.00
Independence	7	84,816	4.05	0	Steady	0.0
Independent	5	23,387	1.12	0	Steady	0.0
Constitution	1	2,492	0.11	0	Steady	0.0
Write-in	8	1,639	0.08	0	Steady	0.0
Total	37	2,090,591	100.0	8	Steady	100.0

Popular vote
Democratic	47.93%
Republican	46.43%
Independence	4.05%
Constitution	0.11%
Other	1.45%

House seats
Democratic	50.00%
Republican	50.00%

=== By district ===
Results of the 2010 United States House of Representatives elections in Minnesota by district:

District	Democratic		Republican		Others		Total		Result
District	Votes	%	Votes	%	Votes	%	Votes	%	Result
District 1	122,365	49.34%	109,242	44.05%	16,398	6.61%	248,005	100.0%	Democratic hold
District 2	104,809	36.59%	181,341	63.30%	303	0.11%	286,453	100.0%	Republican hold
District 3	100,240	36.57%	161,177	58.80%	12,675	4.62%	274,092	100.0%	Republican hold
District 4	136,746	59.09%	80,141	34.63%	14,539	6.28%	231,426	100.0%	Democratic hold
District 5	154,833	67.69%	55,222	24.14%	18,691	8.17%	228,746	100.0%	Democratic hold
District 6	120,846	39.79%	159,476	52.51%	23,369	7.70%	303,691	100.0%	Republican hold
District 7	133,096	55.20%	90,652	37.60%	17,349	7.20%	241,097	100.0%	Democratic hold
District 8	129,091	46.59%	133,490	48.18%	14,500	5.23%	277,081	100.0%	Republican gain
Total	1,002,026	47.93%	970,741	46.43%	117,824	5.64%	2,090,591	100.0%	

== District 1 ==
2010 Minnesota's 1st congressional district election
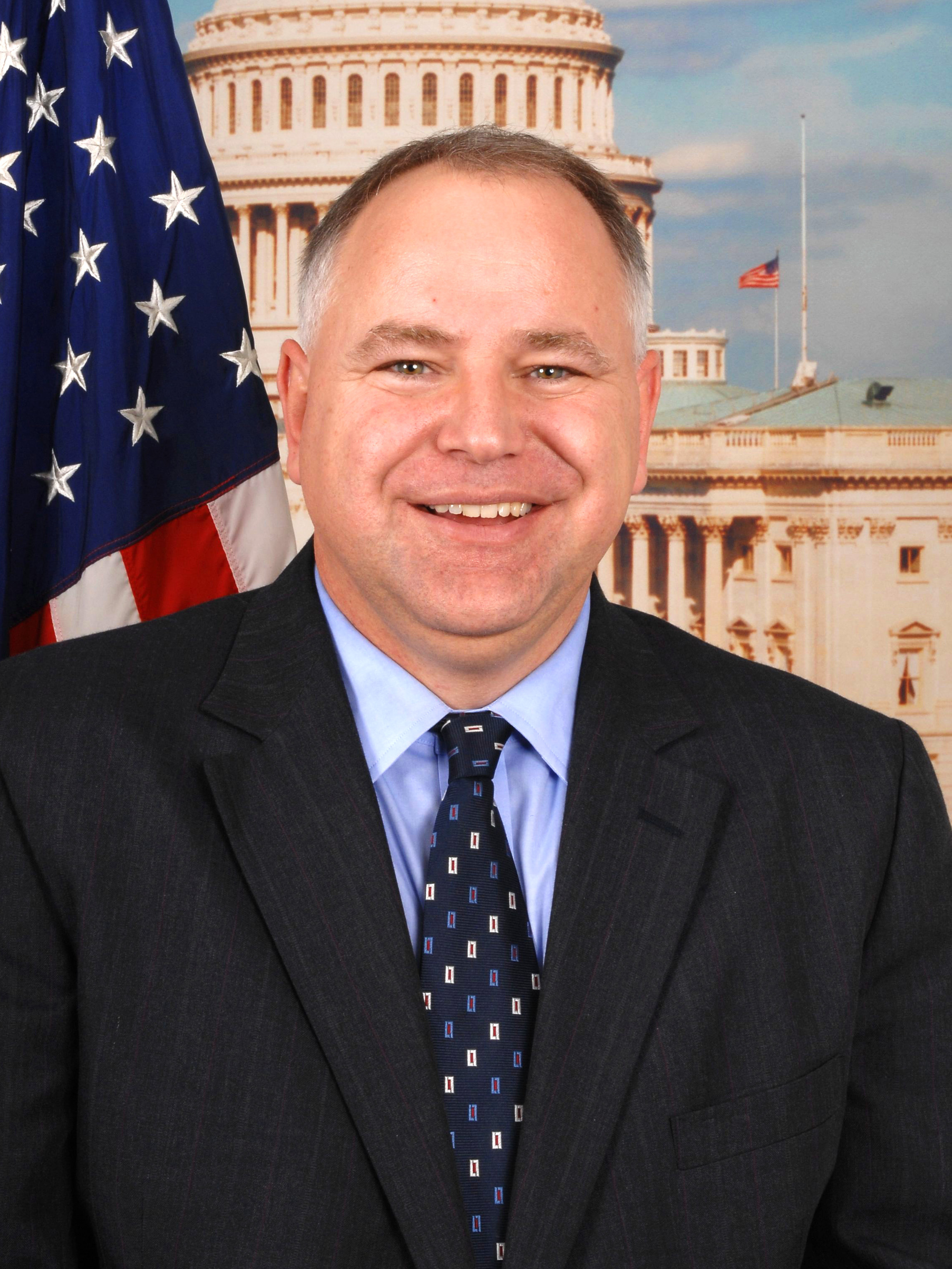

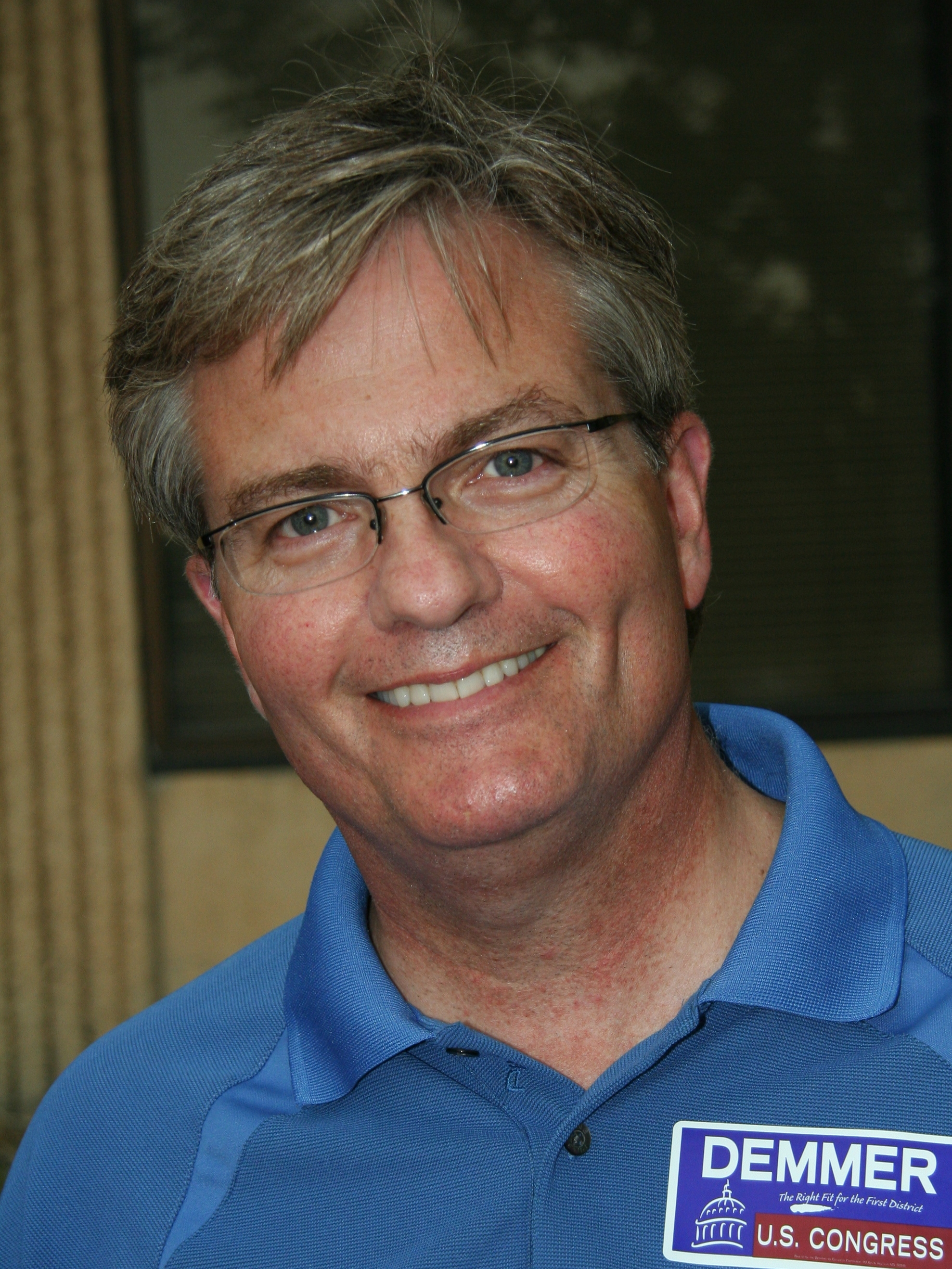

Nominee	Tim Walz	Randy Demmer	Steve Wilson
Party	Democratic (DFL)	Republican	Independence
Popular vote	122,365	109,242	13,242
Percentage	49.3%	44.1%	5.3%
- Precinct results Walz: 40–50% 50–60% 60–70% 70–80% 80–90% >90% Demmer: 40–50% 50–60% 60–70% 70–80% 80–90% >90% Tie: 40–50% 50% No votes
U.S. Representative before election
Tim Walz
Democratic (DFL)
Elected U.S. Representative
Tim Walz
Democratic (DFL)

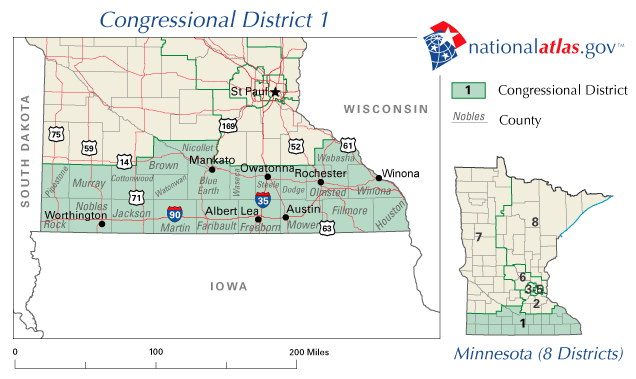

Incumbent Democrat Tim Walz, who had represented the district since 2007, ran for reelection. He was reelected with 62.5% of the vote in 2008. The district had a PVI of R+1.

No primary elections were held in the 1st congressional district in 2010.

=== Democratic primary ===
==== Candidates ====
===== Nominee =====
- Tim Walz, incumbent U.S. Representative

=== Republican primary ===
==== Candidates ====
===== Nominee =====
- Randy Demmer, state representative and candidate for this seat in 2008

===== Withdrawn =====
- Jim Engstrand, Minnesota Army National Guard Lieutenant Colonel and Iraq veteran
- Jim Hagedorn, former congressional affairs officer for the Bureau of Engraving and Printing and son of former U.S. Representative Tom Hagedorn
- Frank McKinzie, veteran
- Allen Quist, former state representative and candidate for governor in 1994 & 1998

==== Campaign ====
Shortly after launching his campaign, Quist attracted controversy for a speech he gave at the Wabasha County Republicans' December 7 Christmas Party, in which he said: "Our country is being destroyed. Every generation has had to fight the fight for freedom... Terrorism? Yes. That's not the big battle. The big battle is in D.C. with the radicals. They aren't liberals. They are radicals. Obama, Pelosi, Walz: they’re not liberals, they're radicals. They are destroying our country." He also spoke against the Affordable Health Care for America Act, saying: "This is the most insidious, evil piece of legislation I have ever seen in my life... Every one of us has to be totally committed to killing this travesty... I have to kill this bill."

=== Independence primary ===
==== Candidates ====
===== Nominee =====
- Steve Wilson, state department diplomat and former Republican candidate for state senator in 2006

=== Independents ===
- Lars Johnson, food safety certification trainer

=== General election ===
==== Endorsements ====
Tim Walz (DFL)

Labor unions

- AFL-CIO

Organizations

- Stonewall Democrats
Randy Demmer (R)

Organizations

- National Republican Congressional Committee "Young Guns" Program

==== Polling ====
Poll source	Date(s) administered	Sample size	Margin of error	Tim Walz (DFL)	Randy Demmer (R)	Steven Wilson (IP)	Lars Johnson (I)	Undecided
Survey USA	October 22–26, 2010	558 (LV)	±4.2%	50%	41%	4%	2%	4%
Grove Insight (D)	October 18–19, 2010	400 (LV)	±4.9%	50%	34%	5%		13%
Survey USA	October 12–14, 2010	584 (LV)	±4.1%	47%	42%	4%	2%	5%

==== Predictions ====
Source	Ranking	As of
The Cook Political Report	Lean D	November 1, 2010
Rothenberg	Likely D	November 1, 2010
Sabato's Crystal Ball	Lean D	November 1, 2010
RCP	Lean D	November 1, 2010
CQ Politics	Lean D	October 28, 2010
New York Times	Lean D	November 1, 2010
FiveThirtyEight	Likely D	November 1, 2010

==== Results ====
Walz won the general election on November 2 with 49% of the vote to Demmer's 44%.

Minnesota's 1st Congressional district election, 2010
Party	Candidate	Votes	%
Democratic (DFL)	Tim Walz (Incumbent)	122,365	49.3
Republican	Randy Demmer	109,242	44.1
Independence	Steve Wilson	13,242	5.3
Party Free	Lars Johnson	3,054	1.2
Write-in		102	0.0
Total votes		248,005	100.0
Democratic (DFL) hold			

==== Finances ====
===== Campaigns =====
Candidate (party)	Raised	Spent	Cash on hand
Tim Walz (DFL)	$2,163,759	$2,175,826	$18,461
Randy Demmer (R)	$939,331	$893,917	$364
Steve Wilson (I)	$25,332	$25,092	$240
Lars Johnson (I)	$9,298	$8,215	$584

===== Outside spending =====
Candidate (party)	Supported	Opposed
Tim Walz (DFL)	$154,188	$550,078
Randy Demmer (R)	$216,812	$263,839
Steve Wilson (I)	$0	$0
Lars Johnson (I)	$0	$0

External links

- Race ranking and details from CQ Politics
- Campaign contributions from OpenSecrets
- Race Profile at The New York Times

== District 2 ==
2010 Minnesota's 2nd congressional district election
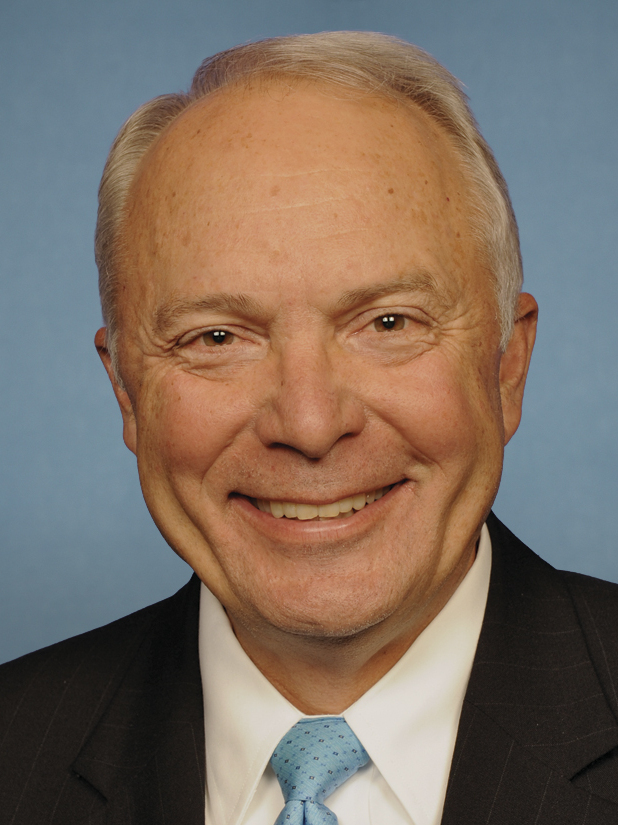

Nominee	John Kline	Shelley Madore
Party	Republican	Democratic (DFL)
Popular vote	181,341	104,809
Percentage	63.3%	36.6%
- Precinct results Kline: 50–60% 60–70% 70–80% 80–90% >90% Madore: 50–60% 60–70% 70–80% No votes
U.S. Representative before election
John Kline
Republican
Elected U.S. Representative
John Kline
Republican

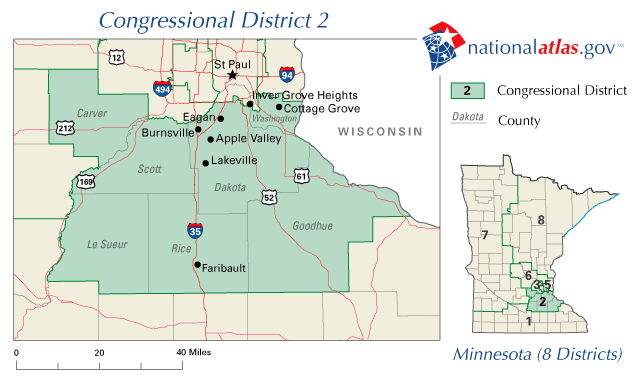

Incumbent Republican John Kline, who had represented the district since 2003, ran for reelection. He was reelected with 57.3% of the vote in 2008. The district had a PVI of R+4.

=== Republican primary ===
==== Candidates ====
===== Nominee =====
- John Kline, incumbent U.S. Representative

==== Results ====
Republican Primary Election
Party	Candidate	Votes	%
Republican	John Kline (Incumbent)	16,151	100.0
Total votes		16,151	100.0

=== Democratic primary ===
==== Candidates ====
===== Nominee =====
- Shelley Madore, former state representative

===== Eliminated in primary =====
- Dan Powers, construction contractor and candidate for this seat in 2008

==== Campaign ====
Despite losing the DFL endorsement to Powers, Madore remained in the race, much to the anger of a number of party loyalists. She was boosted by questions about Powers's résumé.

==== Results ====
Democratic Primary Election
Party	Candidate	Votes	%
Democratic (DFL)	Shelley Madore	19,990	54.7
Democratic (DFL)	Dan Powers	16,528	45.3
Total votes		36,518	100.0

=== General election ===
==== Endorsements ====
Shelley Madore (DFL)

Labor unions

- AFL-CIO

Organizations

- Stonewall Democrats

==== Predictions ====
Source	Ranking	As of
The Cook Political Report	Safe R	November 1, 2010
Rothenberg	Safe R	November 1, 2010
Sabato's Crystal Ball	Safe R	November 1, 2010
RCP	Safe R	November 1, 2010
CQ Politics	Safe R	October 28, 2010
New York Times	Safe R	November 1, 2010
FiveThirtyEight	Safe R	November 1, 2010

==== Results ====
Kline won the general election on November 2, 63% to 37%.

Minnesota's 2nd Congressional district election, 2010
Party	Candidate	Votes	%
Republican	John Kline (Incumbent)	181,341	63.3
Democratic (DFL)	Shelley Madore	104,809	36.6
Write-in		303	0.1
Total votes		286,453	100.0
Republican hold			

==== Finances ====
===== Campaigns =====
Candidate (party)	Raised	Spent	Cash on hand
John Kline (R)	$1,552,172	$1,404,779	$170,270
Shelley Madore (DFL)	$88,848	$88,206	$642

===== Outside spending =====
Candidate (party)	Supported	Opposed
John Kline (R)	$1,314	$0
Shelley Madore (DFL)	$923	$0

External links

- Race ranking and details from CQ Politics
- Campaign contributions from OpenSecrets
- Race Profile at The New York Times

== District 3 ==
2010 Minnesota's 3rd congressional district election
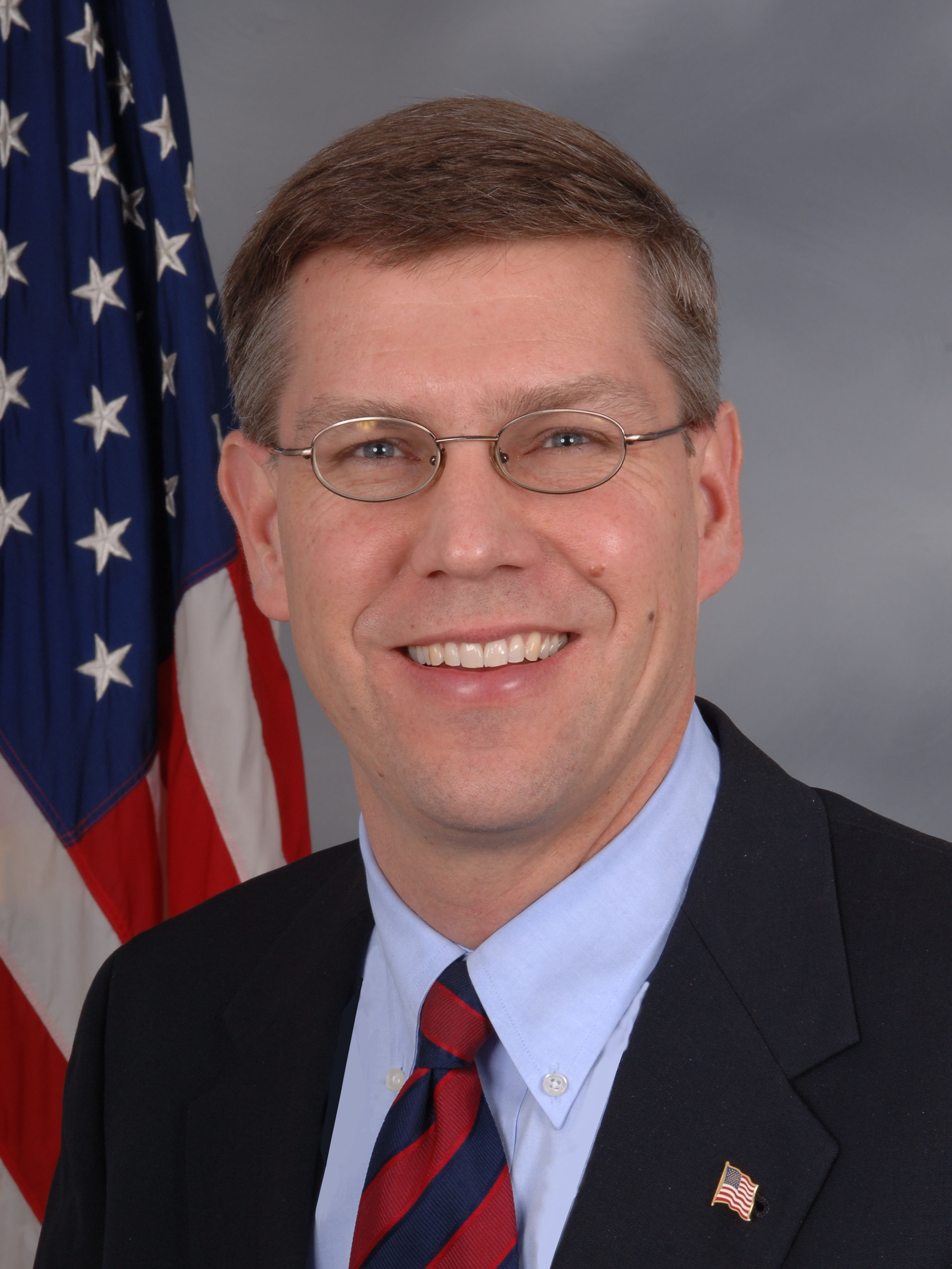

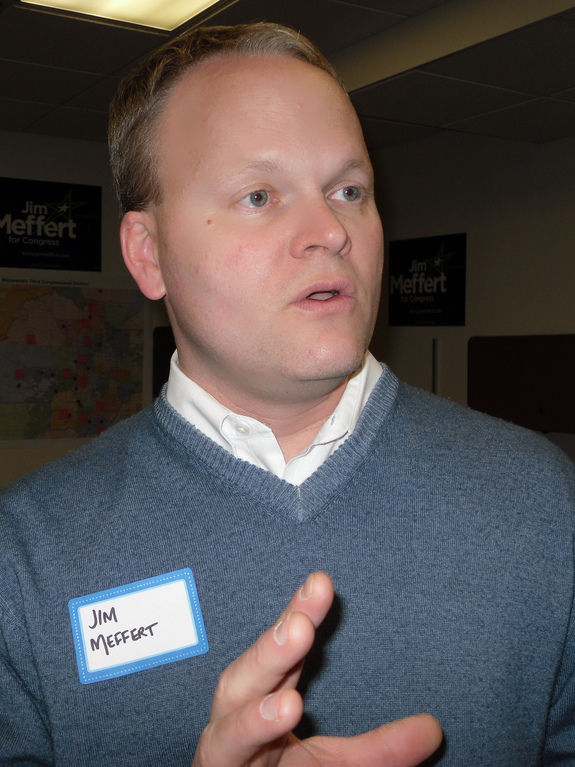
Nominee	Erik Paulsen	Jim Meffert
Party	Republican	Democratic (DFL)
Popular vote	161,177	100,240
Percentage	58.8%	36.6%
- Precinct results Paulsen: 40–50% 50–60% 60–70% 70–80% Meffert: 40–50% 50–60% 60–70%
U.S. Representative before election
Erik Paulsen
Republican
Elected U.S. Representative
Erik Paulsen
Republican

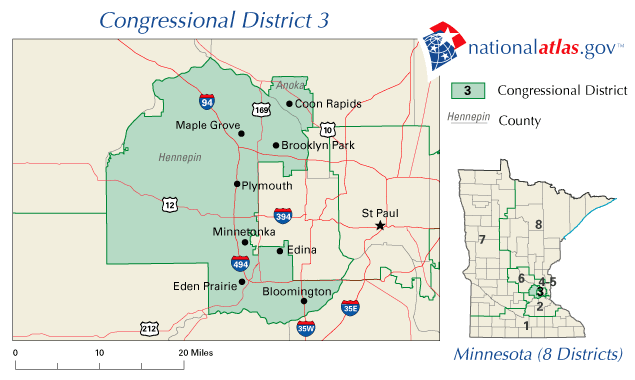

Incumbent Republican Erik Paulsen, who had represented the district since 2009, ran for reelection. He was elected with 48.5% of the vote in 2008. The district had a PVI of Even.

No primary elections were held in the 3rd congressional district in 2010.

=== Republican primary ===
==== Candidates ====
===== Nominee =====
- Erik Paulsen, incumbent U.S. Representative

=== Democratic primary ===
==== Candidates ====
===== Nominee =====
- Jim Meffert, former President of the Minnesota Parent-Teacher Association

===== Withdrawn =====
- Maureen Hackett, Air Force veteran and forensic psychiatrist

===== Declined =====
- Terri Bonoff, state senator and candidate for this seat in 2008

=== General election ===
==== Campaign ====
Meffert lacked the funds to afford television advertising, but he gained some name recognition from the Paulsen campaign's attack ads. Political analyst David Schultz said, "Given how little money that Meffert has, you would've thought Paulsen would've just ignored Meffert completely and just run a positive campaign." Meffert responded to the attack: "It's the kind of thing that makes people cynical about politics and politicians when you hide behind a big bank account and you throw up an ad that's designed to tear down your opponent." After the Paulsen campaign included a misleading graph in a mailing, Meffert filed an ethics complaint against Paulsen.

===== Endorsements =====
Erik Paulsen (R)

Organizations

- National Republican Congressional Committee "Patriot" Program
Jim Meffert (DFL)

Labor unions

- AFL-CIO

Organizations

- Stonewall Democrats

==== Predictions ====
Source	Ranking	As of
The Cook Political Report	Safe R	November 1, 2010
Rothenberg	Safe R	November 1, 2010
Sabato's Crystal Ball	Safe R	November 1, 2010
RCP	Safe R	November 1, 2010
CQ Politics	Safe R	October 28, 2010
New York Times	Safe R	November 1, 2010
FiveThirtyEight	Safe R	November 1, 2010

==== Results ====
Paulsen won the general election on November 2, 59% to 37%.

Minnesota's 3rd Congressional district election, 2010
Party	Candidate	Votes	%
Republican	Erik Paulsen (Incumbent)	161,177	58.8
Democratic (DFL)	Jim Meffert	100,240	36.6
Independence	Jon Olseon	12,508	4.6
Write-in		167	0.1
Total votes		274,092	100.0
Republican hold			

==== Finances ====
===== Campaigns =====
Candidate (party)	Raised	Spent	Cash on hand
Erik Paulsen (R)	$2,688,948	$2,575,922	$149,536
Jim Meffert (DFL)	$529,369	$529,269	$101
Jon Olseon (I)	$18,866	$18,646	$219

===== Outside spending =====
Candidate (party)	Supported	Opposed
Erik Paulsen (R)	$74,163	$0
Jim Meffert (DFL)	$923	$0
Jon Olseon (I)	$0	$0

External links

- Race ranking and details from CQ Politics
- Campaign contributions from OpenSecrets
- Race Profile at The New York Times

== District 4 ==
2010 Minnesota's 4th congressional district election
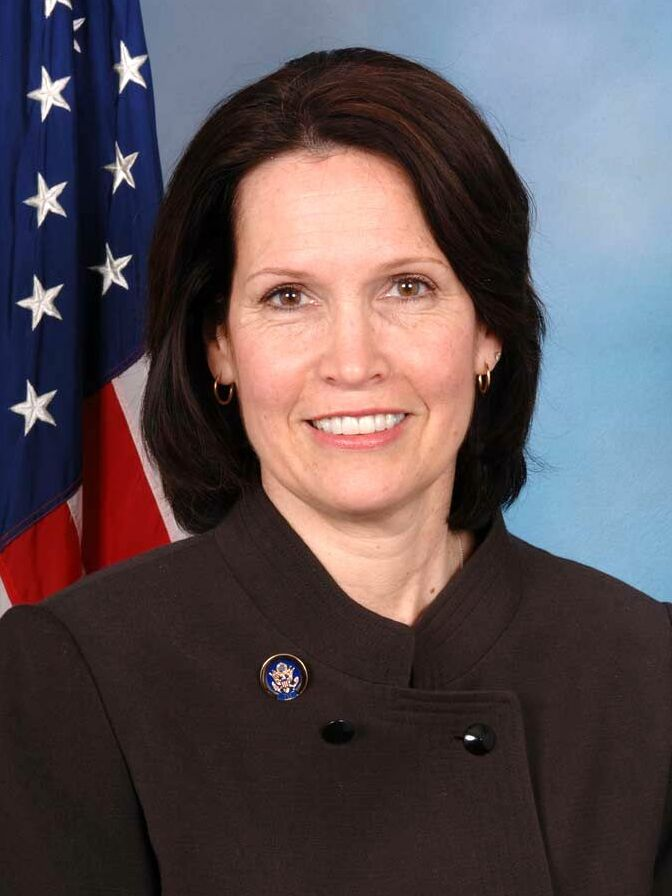

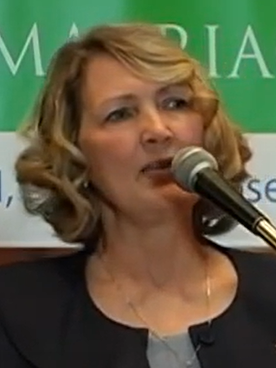

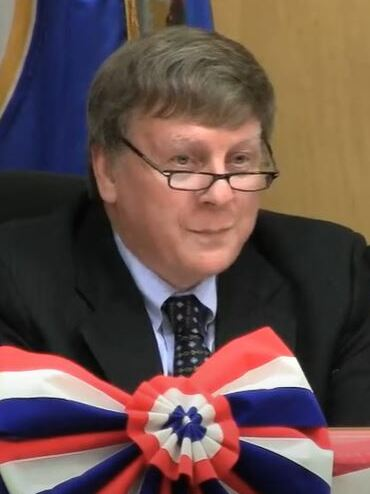
Nominee	Betty McCollum	Teresa Collett	Steve Carlson
Party	Democratic (DFL)	Republican	Independence
Popular vote	136,746	80,141	14,207
Percentage	59.1%	34.6%	6.1%
- Precinct results McCollum: 40–50% 50–60% 60–70% 70–80% 80–90% Collett: 40–50% 50–60% 60–70%
U.S. Representative before election
Betty McCollum
Democratic (DFL)
Elected U.S. Representative
Betty McCollum
Democratic (DFL)

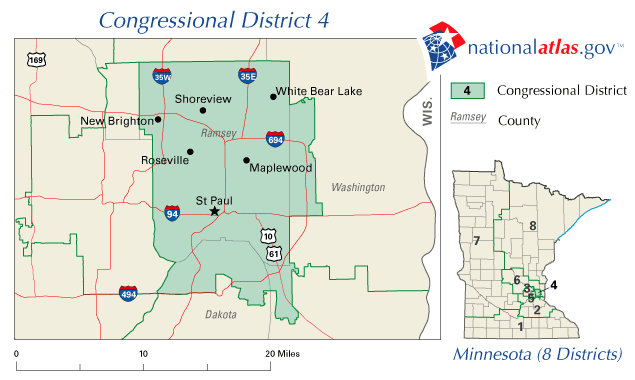

Incumbent Betty McCollum, who had represented the district since 2001, ran for reelection. She was reelected with 68.4% of the vote in 2008. The district had a PVI of D+13.

=== Democratic primary ===
==== Candidates ====
===== Nominee =====
- Betty McCollum, incumbent U.S. Representative

===== Eliminated in primary =====
- Diana Longrie, attorney and former Mayor of Maplewood

==== Results ====
Democratic Primary Election
Party	Candidate	Votes	%
Democratic (DFL)	Betty McCollum (Incumbent)	55,491	86.6
Democratic (DFL)	Diana Longrie	8,622	13.4
Total votes		64,113	100.0

=== Republican primary ===
==== Candidates ====
===== Nominee =====
- Teresa Collett, law professor at the University of St. Thomas

===== Eliminated in primary =====
- Jack Shepard, fugitive, alleged arsonist, and former Minneapolis dentist who fled the country after allegedly attempting to burn down his dental office

==== Results ====
Republican Primary Election
Party	Candidate	Votes	%
Republican	Teresa Collett	6,949	67.2
Republican	Jack Shepard	3,392	32.8
Total votes		10,341	100.0

=== Independence primary ===
==== Candidates ====
===== Nominee =====
- Steve Carlson, consultant and writer

==== Results ====
Independence Party Primary Election
Party	Candidate	Votes	%
Independence	Steve Carlson	1,550	100.0
Total votes		1,550	100.0

=== General election ===
==== Endorsements ====
Betty McCollum (DFL)

Labor unions

- AFL-CIO

==== Predictions ====
Source	Ranking	As of
The Cook Political Report	Safe D	November 1, 2010
Rothenberg	Safe D	November 1, 2010
Sabato's Crystal Ball	Safe D	November 1, 2010
RCP	Safe D	November 1, 2010
CQ Politics	Safe D	October 28, 2010
New York Times	Safe D	November 1, 2010
FiveThirtyEight	Safe D	November 1, 2010

==== Results ====
McCollum won the general election on November 2, 59% to 35%.

Minnesota's 4th Congressional district election, 2010
Party	Candidate	Votes	%
Democratic (DFL)	Betty McCollum (Incumbent)	136,746	59.1
Republican	Teresa Collett	80,141	34.6
Independence	Steve Carlson	14,207	6.1
Write-in		332	0.1
Total votes		231,426	100.0
Democratic (DFL) hold			

==== Finances ====
===== Campaigns =====
Candidate (party)	Raised	Spent	Cash on hand
Betty McCollum (DFL)	$844,301	$862,848	$58,708
Teresa Collett (R)	$216,532	$211,206	$5,532
Steve Carlson (I)	Unreported		

===== Outside spending =====
Candidate (party)	Supported	Opposed
Betty McCollum (DFL)	$6,498	$0
Teresa Collett (R)	$4,182	$0
Steve Carlson (I)	$0	$0

External links

- Race ranking and details from CQ Politics
- Campaign contributions from OpenSecrets
- Race Profile at The New York Times

== District 5 ==
2010 Minnesota's 5th congressional district election
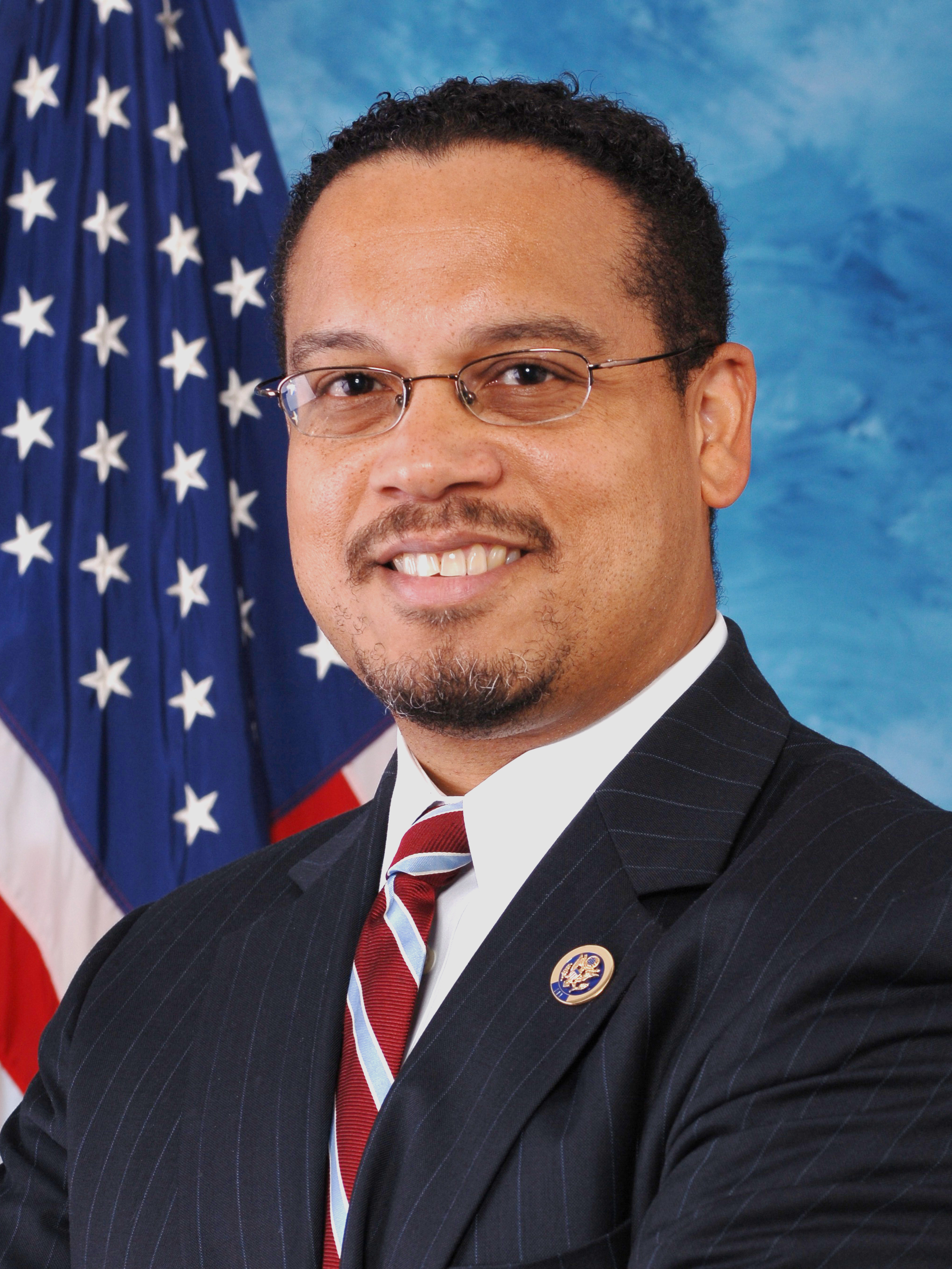

Nominee	Keith Ellison	Joel Demos
Party	Democratic (DFL)	Republican
Popular vote	154,833	55,222
Percentage	67.7%	24.1%
- Precinct results Ellison: 40–50% 50–60% 60–70% 70–80% 80–90% >90% Demos: 50–60% Tie: 40–50% No votes
U.S. Representative before election
Keith Ellison
Democratic (DFL)
Elected U.S. Representative
Keith Ellison
Democratic (DFL)

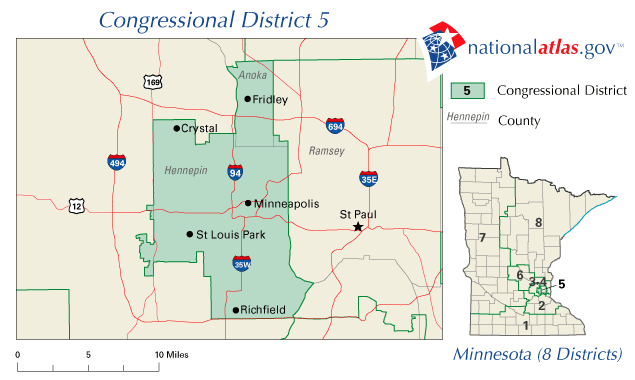

Incumbent Keith Ellison, who had represented the district since 2007, ran for reelection. Ellison is the first Muslim to be elected to Congress. He was reelected with 67.7% of the vote in 2008. The district had a PVI of D+23.

=== Democratic primary ===
==== Candidates ====
===== Nominee =====
- Keith Ellison, incumbent U.S. Representative

===== Eliminated in primary =====
- Gregg A. Iverson, perennial candidate and U.S. Army veteran
- Barb Davis White, minister, author, civil rights activist and Republican nominee for this seat in 2008

==== Results ====
Democratic Primary Election
Party	Candidate	Votes	%
Democratic (DFL)	Keith Ellison (Incumbent)	55,424	81.6
Democratic (DFL)	Barb Davis White	7,963	11.7
Democratic (DFL)	Gregg A. Iverson	4,575	6.7
Total votes		67,962	100.0

=== Republican primary ===
==== Candidates ====
===== Nominee =====
- Joel Demos, banker

==== Results ====
Republican Primary Election
Party	Candidate	Votes	%
Republican	Joel Demos	4,975	100.0
Total votes		4,975	100.0

=== Independence primary ===
==== Candidates ====
===== Nominee =====
- Tom Schrunk, artist and designer

==== Results ====
Independence Party Primary Election
Party	Candidate	Votes	%
Independence	Tom Schrunk	1,202	100.0
Total votes		1,202	100.0

=== Other candidates ===
- Michael Cavlan, political activist, registered nurse and Green nominee for U.S. Senate in 2006 (Independent Progressive)
- Lynne Torgerson, attorney and candidate for State House, District 59A in 2008 (Independent)

=== General election ===
==== Endorsements ====
Keith Ellison (DFL)

Labor unions

- AFL-CIO

Organizations

- Stonewall Democrats

==== Predictions ====
Source	Ranking	As of
The Cook Political Report	Safe D	November 1, 2010
Rothenberg	Safe D	November 1, 2010
Sabato's Crystal Ball	Safe D	November 1, 2010
RCP	Safe D	November 1, 2010
CQ Politics	Safe D	October 28, 2010
New York Times	Safe D	November 1, 2010
FiveThirtyEight	Safe D	November 1, 2010

==== Results ====
Ellison won the general election on November 2, 68% to 24%.

Minnesota's 5th Congressional district election, 2010
Party	Candidate	Votes	%
Democratic (DFL)	Keith Ellison (Incumbent)	154,833	67.7
Republican	Joel Demos	55,222	24.1
Independent	Lynne Torgerson	8,548	3.7
Independence	Tom Schrunk	7,446	3.3
Independent Progressive	Michael Cavlan	2,468	1.1
Write-in		229	0.1
Total votes		228,746	100.0
Democratic (DFL) hold			

==== Finances ====
===== Campaigns =====
Candidate (party)	Raised	Spent	Cash on hand
Keith Ellison (DFL)	$1,397,497	$1,295,839	$163,579
Joel Demos (R)	$95,235	$89,731	$5,667
Tom Schrunk (I)	Unreported		
Michael Cavlan (IC)	$3,903	$1,403	$2,500
Lynne Torgerson (I)	$60,794	$59,639	$1,155

===== Outside Spending =====
Candidate (party)	Supported	Opposed
Keith Ellison (DFL)	$3,680	$0
Joel Demos (R)	$0	$0
Tom Schrunk (I)	$0	$0
Michael Cavlan (IC)	$0	$0
Lynne Torgerson (I)	$1,926	$0

External links

- Race ranking and details from CQ Politics
- Campaign contributions from OpenSecrets
- Race Profile at The New York Times

== District 6 ==
2010 Minnesota's 6th congressional district election
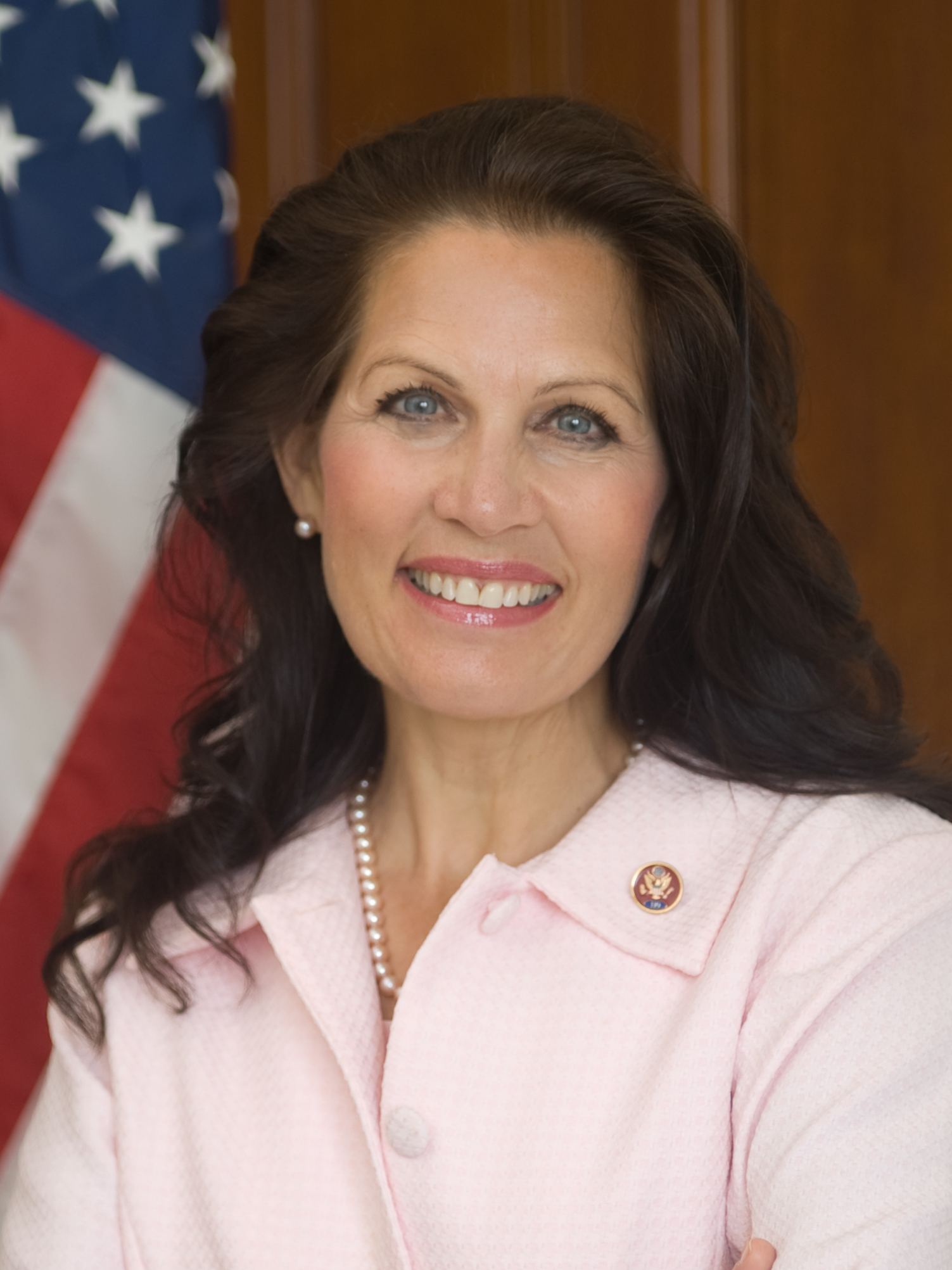

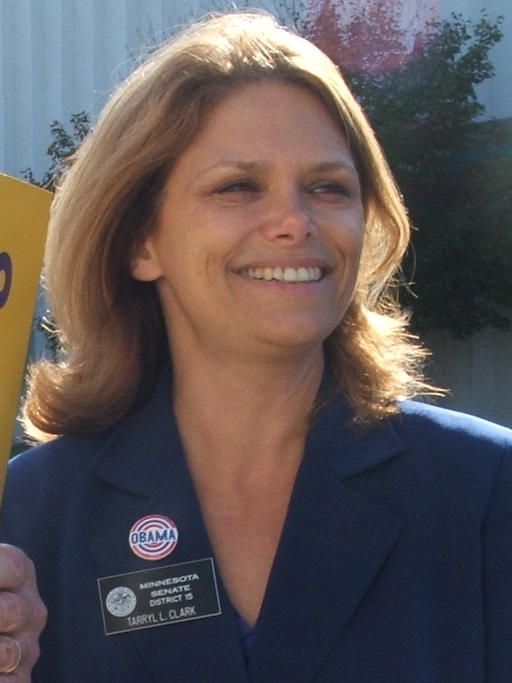

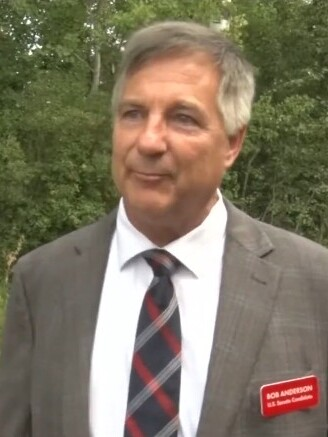
Nominee	Michele Bachmann	Tarryl Clark	Bob Anderson
Party	Republican	Democratic (DFL)	Independence
Popular vote	159,476	120,846	17,698
Percentage	52.5%	39.8%	5.8%
- Precinct results Bachmann: 40–50% 50–60% 60–70% 70–80% >90% Clark: 40–50% 50–60% 60–70% Tie: 40–50% No votes
U.S. Representative before election
Michele Bachmann
Republican
Elected U.S. Representative
Michele Bachmann
Republican

Incumbent Republican Michele Bachmann, who had represented the district since 2007, ran for reelection. She was reelected with 46.4% of the vote in 2008. The district had a PVI of R+7.

=== Republican primary ===
==== Candidates ====
===== Nominee =====
- Michele Bachmann, incumbent U.S. Representative

==== Results ====
Republican Primary Election
Party	Candidate	Votes	%
Republican	Michele Bachmann (Incumbent)	17,237	100.0
Total votes		17,237	100.0

=== Democratic primary ===
The DFL endorsed Tarryl Clark, the state senate assistant majority leader. She was Bachmann's sole Democratic challenger, Maureen Reed having dropped out of the race in June. A physician and former University of Minnesota regent chair, Reed threw her support behind Clark, saying she felt "it is time for the DFL to unify behind one candidate in this race".

==== Candidates ====
===== Nominee =====
- Tarryl Clark, state senator and assistant majority leader of the Minnesota State Senate

===== Eliminated in primary =====
- Maureen Reed, physician, former chair of the Board of Regents of the University of Minnesota and Independence nominee for Lieutenant Governor in 2006

===== Withdrawn =====
- Elwyn Tinklenberg, former Minnesota Commissioner of Transportation and nominee for this seat in 2008

==== Results ====
Democratic Primary Election
Party	Candidate	Votes	%
Democratic (DFL)	Tarryl Clark	28,185	69.1
Democratic (DFL)	Maureen Kennedy Reed	12,603	30.9
Total votes		40,788	100.0

=== Independence primary ===
==== Candidates ====
===== Nominee =====
- Bob Anderson, dental technician

==== Results ====
Independence Party Primary Election
Party	Candidate	Votes	%
Independence	Bob Anderson	1,418	100.0
Total votes		1,418	100.0

=== Other candidates ===
- Aubrey Immelman, associate professor of psychology and Republican candidate for this seat in 2008 (Independent)

=== General election ===
==== Endorsements ====
Michele Bachmann (R)

Organizations

- National Republican Congressional Committee "Patriot" Program
Tarryl Clark (DFL)

Labor unions

- AFL-CIO

Organizations

- Democratic Congressional Campaign Committee "Red to Blue" Program
- Stonewall Democrats

==== Polling ====
Poll source	Date(s) administered	Sample size	Margin of error	Michele Bachmann (R)	Tarryl Clark (DFL)	Bob Anderson (IP)	Aubrey Immelman (I)	Undecided
Survey USA	September 15, 2010	582 (LV)	±4.1%	49%	40%	6%	1%	4%
Survey USA	July 9–11, 2010	565 (LV)	±4.2%	48%	39%	6%	2%	5%
Public Policy Polling	December 17–20, 2009	719 (RV)	±3.7%	55%	37%	–	–	8%

Hypothetical polling

Bachmann vs. Reed

Poll source	Date(s) administered	Sample size	Margin of error	Michele Bachmann (R)	Maureen Reed (DFL)	Undecided
Public Policy Polling	December 17–20, 2009	719 (RV)	±3.7%	53%	37%	10%

==== Predictions ====
Source	Ranking	As of
The Cook Political Report	Likely R	November 1, 2010
Rothenberg	Safe R	November 1, 2010
Sabato's Crystal Ball	Likely R	November 1, 2010
RCP	Likely R	November 1, 2010
CQ Politics	Safe R	October 28, 2010
New York Times	Lean R	November 1, 2010
FiveThirtyEight	Safe R	November 1, 2010

==== Results ====
Bachmann won the general election on November 2, 52% to 38%.

Minnesota's 6th Congressional district election, 2010
Party	Candidate	Votes	%
Republican	Michele Bachmann (Incumbent)	159,476	52.5
Democratic (DFL)	Tarryl Clark	120,846	39.8
Independence	Bob Anderson	17,698	5.8
Independent	Aubrey Immelman	5,490	1.8
Write-in		181	0.1
Total votes		303,691	100.0
Republican hold			

==== Finances ====
===== Campaigns =====
Candidate (party)	Raised	Spent	Cash on hand
Michele Bachmann (R)	$13,562,811	$11,661,973	$1,901,650
Tarryl Clark (DFL)	$4,718,912	$4,691,807	$27,104
Bob Anderson (I)	$440	$557	$7
Aubrey Immelman (I)	$4,470	$952	$0

===== Outside spending =====
Candidate (party)	Supported	Opposed
Michele Bachmann (R)	$60,089	$7,818
Tarryl Clark (DFL)	$58,517	$0
Bob Anderson (I)	$0	$0
Aubrey Immelman (I)	$0	$0

External links

- Race ranking and details from CQ Politics
- Campaign contributions from OpenSecrets
- Race Profile at The New York Times

== District 7 ==
2010 Minnesota's 7th congressional district election
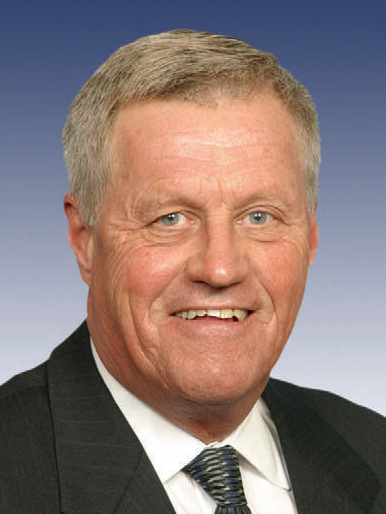

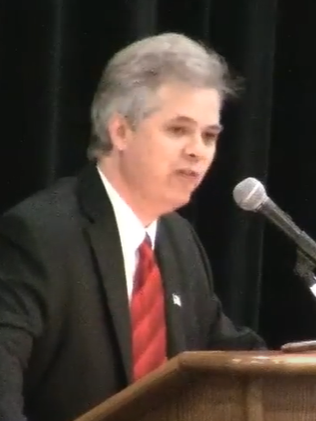
Nominee	Collin Peterson	Lee Byberg
Party	Democratic (DFL)	Republican
Popular vote	133,096	90,652
Percentage	55.2%	37.6%
- Precinct results Peterson: 30–40% 40–50% 50–60% 60–70% 70–80% 80–90% >90% Byberg: 40–50% 50–60% 60–70% 70–80% 80–90% >90% Tie: 40–50% 50% No votes
U.S. Representative before election
Collin Peterson
Democratic (DFL)
Elected U.S. Representative
Collin Peterson
Democratic (DFL)

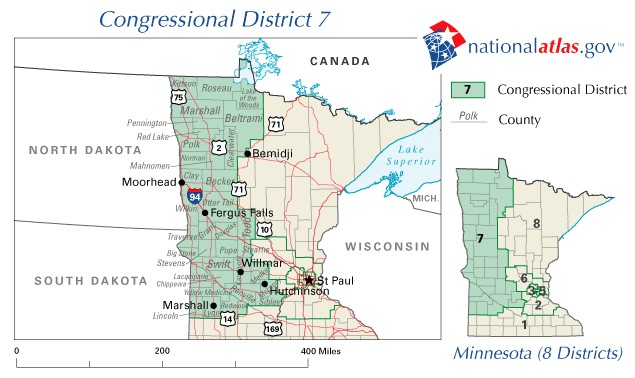

Incumbent Collin Peterson, who had represented the district since 1991, ran for reelection. He was reelected with 72.2% of the vote in 2008. The district had a PVI of R+5.

=== Democratic primary ===
==== Candidates ====
===== Nominee =====
- Collin Peterson, incumbent U.S. Representative

==== Results ====
Democratic Primary Election
Party	Candidate	Votes	%
Democratic (DFL)	Collin Peterson (Incumbent)	42,104	100.0
Total votes		42,104	100.0

=== Republican primary ===
==== Candidates ====
===== Nominee =====
- Lee Byberg, business executive

===== Eliminated in primary =====
- Alan Roebke, farmer and candidate for this seat in 2008

===== Withdrawn =====
- Glen Menze, accountant and nominee for this seat in 2008

==== Results ====
Republican Primary Election
Party	Candidate	Votes	%
Republican	Lee Byberg	11,417	61.0
Republican	Alan Roebke	7,315	39.0
Total votes		18,732	100.0

=== Independence primary ===
==== Candidates ====
===== Nominee =====
- Glen Menze, accountant and Republican nominee for this seat in 2008

==== Results ====
Independence Party Primary Election
Party	Candidate	Votes	%
Independence	Glen R. Menze	2,242	100.0
Total votes		2,242	100.0

=== Other candidates ===
- Gene Waldorf, former DFL state senator (Independent)

=== General election ===
==== Endorsements ====
Collin Peterson (DFL)

Labor unions

- AFL-CIO
Lee Byberg (R)

Organizations

- National Republican Congressional Committee "On the Radar" Program

==== Predictions ====
Source	Ranking	As of
The Cook Political Report	Safe D	November 1, 2010
Rothenberg	Safe D	November 1, 2010
Sabato's Crystal Ball	Safe D	November 1, 2010
RCP	Likely D	November 1, 2010
CQ Politics	Safe D	October 28, 2010
New York Times	Safe D	November 1, 2010
FiveThirtyEight	Safe D	November 1, 2010

==== Results ====
Peterson won the general election on November 2, 55% to 38%.

Minnesota's 7th Congressional district election, 2010
Party	Candidate	Votes	%
Democratic (DFL)	Collin Peterson (Incumbent)	133,096	55.2
Republican	Lee Byberg	90,652	37.6
Independent	Gene Waldorf	9,317	3.9
Independence	Glen Menze	7,839	3.3
Write-in		193	0.1
Total votes		241,097	100.0
Democratic (DFL) hold			

==== Finances ====
===== Campaigns =====
Candidate (party)	Raised	Spent	Cash on hand
Collin Peterson (DFL)	$1,174,500	$1,269,568	$402,275
Lee Byberg (R)	$396,707	$379,261	$17,447
Glen Menze (I)	$13,965	$13,965	$0
Gene Waldorf (I)	$62,351	$61,018	$1,334

===== Outside spending =====
Candidate (party)	Supported	Opposed
Collin Peterson (DFL)	$8,101	$0
Lee Byberg (R)	$2,496	$0
Glen Menze (I)	$0	$0
Gene Waldorf (I)	$0	$0

External links

- Race ranking and details from CQ Politics
- Campaign contributions from OpenSecrets
- Race Profile at The New York Times

== District 8 ==
2010 Minnesota's 8th congressional district election
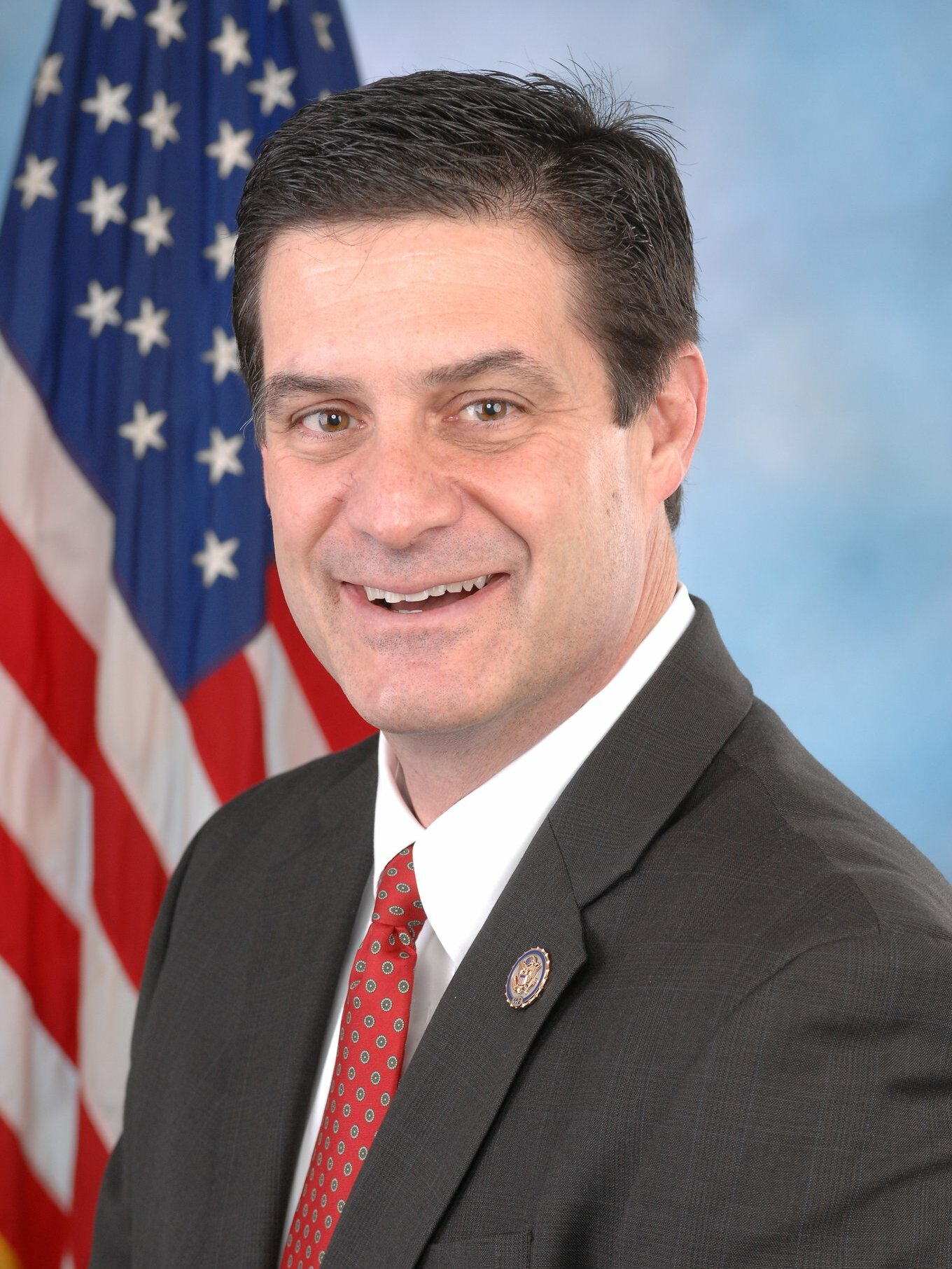

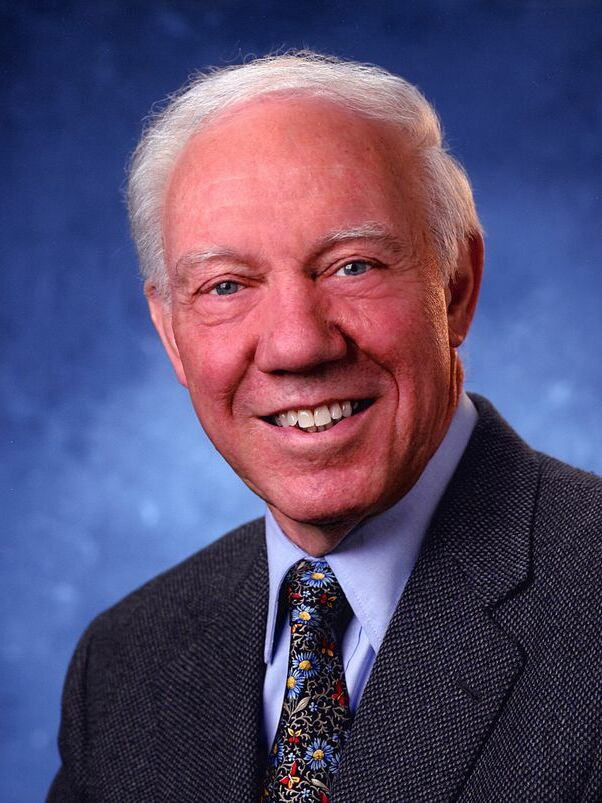
Nominee	Chip Cravaack	Jim Oberstar
Party	Republican	Democratic (DFL)
Popular vote	133,490	129,091
Percentage	48.2%	46.6%
- Precinct results Cravaack: 30–40% 40–50% 50–60% 60–70% 70–80% 80–90% >90% Oberstar: 40–50% 50–60% 60–70% 70–80% 80–90% >90% Tie: 40–50% 50% No votes
U.S. Representative before election
Jim Oberstar
Democratic (DFL)
Elected U.S. Representative
Chip Cravaack
Republican

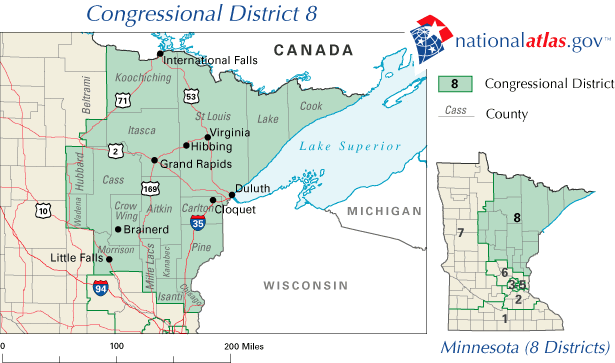

Incumbent Jim Oberstar, who had represented the district since 1975, ran for reelection. He was reelected with 67.7% of the vote in 2008. The district had a PVI of D+3.

=== Democratic primary ===
==== Candidates ====
===== Nominee =====
- Jim Oberstar, incumbent U.S. Representative

===== Eliminated in primary =====
- W. D. (Bill) Ham, chair of the Freedom Coalition of Minnesota

==== Results ====
Democratic Primary Election
Party	Candidate	Votes	%
Democratic (DFL)	James L. Oberstar (Incumbent)	56,510	80.5
Democratic (DFL)	W. D. (Bill) Ham	13,710	19.5
Total votes		70,220	100.0

=== Republican primary ===
==== Candidates ====
===== Nominee =====
- Chip Cravaack, former Northwest Airlines pilot

===== Withdrawn =====
- Michael Cummins, small business owner and nominee for this seat in 2008 (withdrew February 2010 endorsed Cravaack)
- Justin Eichorn, small business owner
- Rob Fransworth, special education teacher
- Darrel Trulson, business owner

==== Results ====
Republican Primary Election
Party	Candidate	Votes	%
Republican	Chip Cravaack	26,608	100.0
Total votes		26,608	100.0

=== Independence primary ===
==== Candidates ====
===== Nominee =====
- Timothy Olson, sawmill operator

==== Results ====
Independence Party Primary Election
Party	Candidate	Votes	%
Independence	Timothy Olson	2,515	100.0
Total votes		2,515	100.0

=== Constitution primary ===
==== Candidates ====
===== Nominee =====
- Richard (George) Burton, electrician

=== General election ===
==== Campaign ====
Cravaack entered the race as the underdog. He was a political novice and Democrats had held the 8th district since 1947. Oberstar was the longest-serving congressman in Minnesota history and had never received less than 59% of the vote.

Cravaack campaigned on a standard Republican platform of free-market principles and government spending cuts while attacking Oberstar's vote for the ACA. He later claimed that Obamacare allowed for the payment of abortions with taxpayer funds and encouraged euthanasia for the elderly and was an example of socialized medicine that would result in the rationing of medical care, all of which lacked any supporting evidence.

===== Endorsements =====
Jim Oberstar (DFL)

Labor unions

- AFL-CIO
Chip Cravaack (R)

U.S. Representatives

- Newt Gingrich, former Speaker of the House

Organizations

- Minnesota Citizens Concerned for Life
- National Republican Congressional Committee "On the Radar" Program

Newspapers

- Duluth News Tribune

==== Polling ====
Poll source	Date(s) administered	Sample size	Margin of error	Jim Oberstar (DFL)	Chip Cravaack (R)	George Burton (C)	Undecided
Survey USA	October 25–28, 2010	665 (LV)	±3.9%	47%	46%	3%	4%
Public Opinion Strategies (R)	September 28–30, 2010	300 (LV)	±5.7%	45%	42%	–	13%

==== Predictions ====
Source	Ranking	As of
The Cook Political Report	Tossup	November 1, 2010
Rothenberg	Likely D	November 1, 2010
Sabato's Crystal Ball	Lean D	November 1, 2010
RCP	Tossup	November 1, 2010
CQ Politics	Likely D	October 28, 2010
New York Times	Safe D	November 1, 2010
FiveThirtyEight	Lean D	November 1, 2010

==== Results ====
In what MinnPost called one of the biggest upsets in Minnesota political history, Cravaack defeated Oberstar by 4,399 votes.

Minnesota's 8th Congressional district election, 2010
Party	Candidate	Votes	%
Republican	Chip Cravaack	133,490	48.2
Democratic (DFL)	Jim Oberstar (Incumbent)	129,091	46.6
Independence	Timothy Olson	11,876	4.3
Constitution	Richard (George) Burton	2,492	0.9
Write-in		132	0.1
Total votes		277,081	100.0
Republican gain from Democratic (DFL)			

==== Finances ====
===== Campaigns =====
Candidate (party)	Raised	Spent	Cash on hand
Jim Oberstar (DFL)	$1,757,326	$2,223,357	$292,086
Chip Cravaack (R)	$659,648	$630,728	$28,920
Timothy Olson (I)	Unreported		
George Burton (C)	Unreported		

===== Outside Spending =====
Candidate (party)	Supported	Opposed
Jim Oberstar (DFL)	$171,206	$82,012
Chip Cravaack (R)	$158,536	$6,567
Timothy Olson (I)	$0	$0
George Burton (C)	$0	$0

External links

- Race ranking and details from CQ Politics
- Campaign contributions from OpenSecrets
- Race Profile at The New York Times

Official campaign websites
- District 1
  - Steve Wilson campaign site
  - Lars Johnson campaign site
- District 6
  - Michele Bachmann for Congress
  - Tarryl Clark for Congress
  - Maureen Reed for Congress
  - Bob Anderson for Congress
  - PVS
  - Aubrey Immelman for Congress
  - PVS
