= Duane Quam =

American politician

Member of the Minnesota House of Representatives from the 24A district 29A (2011–2012), 25A (2013-2022)
- Incumbent
- Assumed office January 4, 2011
- Preceded by: Randy Demmer

Personal details
- Born: July 2, 1960 (age 66) Rochester, Minnesota, U.S.
- Party: Republican Party of Minnesota
- Spouse: Pat Quam
- Children: 2
- Education: University of Texas at Dallas
- Occupation: Engineer, legislator

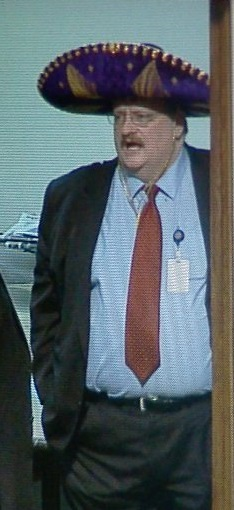
Duane Quam in the Minnesota House of Representatives

Duane Robert Quam II (born July 2, 1960) is an American politician serving in the Minnesota House of Representatives since 2011. A member of the Republican Party of Minnesota, Quam represents District 24A in southeast Minnesota, including the cities of Kasson and Byron, parts of Rochester, and parts of Dodge and Olmsted Counties. He is also an engineer.

== Early life, education, and career ==
Quam was raised on a farm and graduated from Byron High School in Byron, and from the University of Texas at Dallas, earning his B.S. in engineering and his M.S. in physics. He is a former member of the Byron School Board, a past chair of the Zumbro Education District governing board, a past chair of the Minnesota State Academic Science Standards writing committee, and a past United Way Community Resource Allocation Committee member, and serves as a consultant on educational texts and a participant on several MCA committees.

== Minnesota House of Representatives ==
Quam was elected to the Minnesota House of Representatives in 2010, running after incumbent Randy Demmer resigned to run for Minnesota's 1st congressional district, and has been reelected every two years since.

Quam serves as the minority lead for the Property Tax Division of the Taxes Committee and also serves on the Elections Finance and Policy, Health Finance and Policy and Human Services Finance Committees.

== 2018 debate incident ==
In October 2018, Quam made headlines when he snatched a microphone from the hand of his opponent, Jamie Mahlberg, during a debate. Quam later tried to hand the mic back to Mahlberg. When she did not take it, he dropped it back in front of her. Quam later apologized. Quam was reelected with 53.6% of the vote.

== Electoral history ==
2010 Minnesota State House - District 29A
Party	Candidate	Votes	%
Republican	Duane Quam	11,259	60.71
Democratic (DFL)	Douglas Wunderlich	7,268	39.19
Write-in		20	0.11
Total votes		18,547	100.0
Republican hold			

2012 Minnesota State House - District 25A
Party	Candidate	Votes	%
Republican	Duane Quam (incumbent)	11,056	54.55
Democratic (DFL)	John Vossen	9,188	45.34
Write-in		22	0.11
Total votes		20,266	100.0
Republican hold			

2014 Minnesota State House - District 25A
Party	Candidate	Votes	%
Republican	Duane Quam (incumbent)	10,970	96.24
Write-in		429	3.76
Total votes		11,399	100.0
Republican hold			

2016 Minnesota State House - District 25A
Party	Candidate	Votes	%
Republican	Duane Quam (incumbent)	12,934	59.96
Democratic (DFL)	Linda (Wally) Walbruch	8,615	39.94
Write-in		21	0.10
Total votes		21,570	100.0
Republican hold			

2018 Minnesota State House - District 25A
Party	Candidate	Votes	%
Republican	Duane Quam (incumbent)	10,376	53.62
Democratic (DFL)	Jamie Mahlberg	8,957	46.29
Write-in		17	0.09
Total votes		19,350	100.0
Republican hold			

2020 Minnesota State House - District 25A
Party	Candidate	Votes	%
Republican	Duane Quam (incumbent)	14,479	57.47
Democratic (DFL)	Kim Hicks	10,692	42.44
Write-in		21	0.08
Total votes		25,192	100.0
Republican hold			

2022 Minnesota State House - District 24A
Party	Candidate	Votes	%
Republican	Duane Quam (incumbent)	12,015	63.97
Democratic (DFL)	Keith McLain	6,758	35.98
Write-in		8	0.04
Total votes		18,781	100.0
Republican hold			

2024 Minnesota State House - District 24A
Party	Candidate	Votes	%
Republican	Duane Quam (incumbent)	15,661	63.40
Democratic (DFL)	Heather Holmes	9,019	36.51
Write-in		23	0.09
Total votes		24,703	100.0
Republican hold			
