= VWP =

VWP may refer to:

- The United States Visa Waiver Program
- The Vietnam Workers Party
- NetBeans Visual Web Pack
- The Vampires, Witches, and Pagans Party, founded by Jonathon Sharkey in 2005
- Voluntary Women Patrols, which became part of the Women's Police Service
