= Sue Jeffers =

American politician (born 1956)

Sue Jeffers (born October 3, 1956) was a candidate for Ramsey County Commissioner, a small business owner, and former candidate for Governor of Minnesota. Jeffers challenged incumbent Tim Pawlenty for the Republican Party nomination in the 2006 Minnesota gubernatorial election, after declining endorsement from the Libertarian Party of Minnesota. The Republican Party of Minnesota declined to consider her endorsement at the 2006 State Convention, citing her previous affiliations with the Libertarian Party of Minnesota.

== Background ==
Jeffers was born in Iowa City, Iowa, and grew up in Mankato, Minnesota and Richfield. She lives in New Brighton, and is the former owner of Stub and Herb's Bar near the University of Minnesota in Minneapolis. Jeffers has been a proponent for lower taxes and property rights, and led a successful effort to revise Hennepin County's smoking ban which was later negated by the Minnesota Statewide Smoking Ban. In 2012 Jeffers announced her candidacy for Ramsey County Commissioner in District 2. In the August 14 primaries she placed second, ensuring a spot on the ballot in November.
