= Kelly Doran =

American businessman (1957–2023)

Kelly J. Doran (November 22, 1957 – December 28, 2023) was an American businessman in Minnesota who owned The Doran Group, an integrated real estate development company. Beginning in 2007, Doran developed more than 3,750 apartment and townhome units throughout the Twin Cities and Denver, Colorado. Doran ran for governor of Minnesota as a member of the Minnesota Democratic-Farmer-Labor Party, but ended his bid in March 2006.

== Biography ==
Doran was born in Duluth, Minnesota, and was the youngest of four children. He was a graduate of the University of Minnesota, and received an MBA from what is now the Carlson School of Management at the University of Minnesota in 1982. Doran was a commercial lender for Bank of America for nine years. Prior to announcing his candidacy for the 2006 election, Doran was president of the Edina-based Robert Muir Company, a construction and development company. The company has developed over 3,000,000 square feet (300,000 m^{2}) of retail space around the Twin Cities.

Doran made an unsuccessful bid for governor of Minnesota in the 2006 election, running as a pro-business centrist. He initially announced that he would run for the United States Senate, but later set his sights on the governor's office. His history of donating to Republicans became an issue during the race, and despite donating $1.85 million to his own campaign, Doran dropped out in March 2006.

After the election, Doran founded Doran Companies, a property development, construction, and management firm. The company has developed suburban commercial centers and high-end student housing, as well as several properties in the University of Minnesota campus area, including the renovation of Sydney Hall and the Minnesota Dinkydome complex. Other projects include the 412 Lofts, The Edge on Oak, The Knoll, and The Bridges. Doran Companies came under local fire in November 2012 when carpenters picketed at the company's offices and outside of Minneapolis City Hall in protest of the firm's labor practices.

In 2020, Doran sold his ownership shares in Doran Companies and created The Doran Group, a property development company focusing on multifamily luxury apartments and townhomes. His son, Evan Doran, serves as president.

Doran died from cancer on December 28, 2023, at the age of 66.
