= Peter Hutchinson (politician) =

American politician

Personal details
- Born: December 17, 1949 (age 76) Faribault, Minnesota, U.S.
- Party: Independence

Peter Hutchinson (born December 17, 1949) is an American politician, businessman and philanthropy executive from the U.S. state of Minnesota. He ran as the Independence Party of Minnesota nominee for governor of Minnesota in 2006.

== Early life and education ==
Hutchinson was born in Faribault, Minnesota, and moved to Rochester, New York with his family at a young age. He graduated from Dartmouth College with a bachelor's degree in government and urban studies, then from Princeton University with a master's degree in public affairs and urban planning.

== Career ==
In 1975, Hutchinson returned to Minnesota and, in 1977, was elected deputy mayor of Minneapolis in the administration of Mayor Albert Hofstede, serving in that post until 1979. After leaving office, he was hired by the Dayton Hudson Corporation, of which he was Vice President of External Affairs and Chairman of the Dayton Hudson Foundation. As chairman of the foundation, he oversaw the distribution of $110 million nationwide for use in community improvement projects.

In 1989, Governor Rudy Perpich appointed Hutchinson the state's Commissioner of Finance. That year, a budget deficit seemed likely, but Hutchinson helped balance the budget by cutting spending. After Perpich was succeeded by Arne Carlson, Hutchinson tendered his resignation. The next year, he and two partners, Babak Armajani and John James, formed the Public Strategies Group, a consulting firm that works mainly with public sector customers. In the mid-1990s, PSG had a contract to run the Minneapolis public schools and Hutchinson served as the superintendent of the Minneapolis Public Schools. In 2004, he and David Osborne wrote The Price of Government: Getting the Results We Need in an Age of Permanent Fiscal Crisis. In 2008, Hutchinson was elected as a fellow of the National Academy of Public Administration.

== Campaign for governor ==
On January 25, 2006, Hutchinson announced his candidacy for governor of Minnesota as an independent, although he would seek the Independence Party's endorsement. His campaign slogan was "Open Up Minnesota", and he promised to restore competence to a state government that he claimed was gridlocked by partisanship. He promised not to campaign on what he called "the 5 G's"—guns, gays, God, gambling, and gynecology—which he claimed were political straw men.

The Independence Party convention was held on June 24 at Midway Stadium in St. Paul. Hutchinson and his team were endorsed on the first ballot, with Hutchinson receiving 90% of the vote and his team running unopposed. He defeated former Jesse Ventura aide Pam Ellison in the September primary with 66% of the vote. The Pioneer Press, Winona's Daily News, and the University of Minnesota's Minnesota Daily endorsed Hutchinson. He faced incumbent Republican Tim Pawlenty and Democrat Mike Hatch in the general election. He received 141,735 votes, 6.4% of the total, and Pawlenty was reelected.

=== Team Minnesota ===
On June 15, 2006, Hutchinson unveiled "Team Minnesota", a group of professionals, politicians, and public servants he recruited to run for various statewide offices on the Independence ticket. His lieutenant governor running mate was Maureen Reed, a former chairman of the University of Minnesota board of regents.

Other members of Team Minnesota included Lucy Gerold, Minneapolis's deputy chief of police, for state auditor; former state commissioner of revenue John James for attorney general; and Brooklyn Park Economic and Redevelopment Director Joel Spoonheim for secretary of state. Former Governor Jesse Ventura endorsed Hutchinson in a series of commercials.

== Bush Foundation ==
In late 2007, Hutchinson joined the Bush Foundation as its president. Under his leadership, in July 2008 the foundation announced its Goals for a Decade, which seek in Minnesota, North Dakota, and South Dakota to develop courageous leaders and engage entire communities in solving problems, support the self-determination of Native nations, and increase educational achievement.

Party political offices
Preceded by Tim Penny	Independence Party of Minnesota nominee for Governor of Minnesota; 2006	Succeeded by Tom Horner
