= Randy Demmer =

American politician

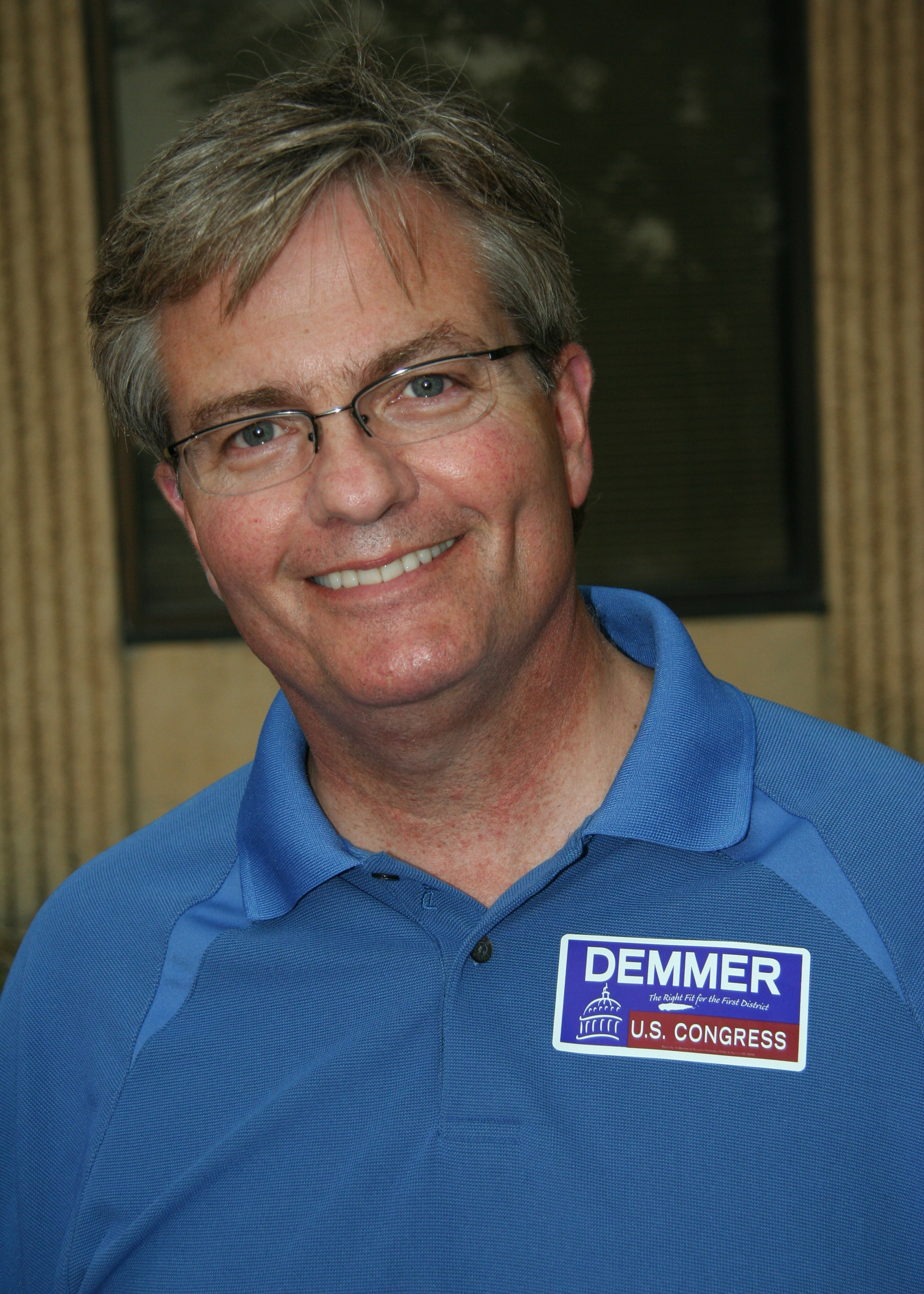

Member of the Minnesota House of Representatives from the 29A district
- In office January 7, 2003 – January 3, 2011
- Succeeded by: Duane Quam

Personal details
- Born: January 3, 1957 (age 69)
- Party: Republican
- Spouse: Kathy
- Children: 3
- Education: University of Minnesota
- Profession: Business owner, legislator

Randy L. Demmer (born January 3, 1957) is an American businessman, politician and a former member of the Minnesota House of Representatives who represented District 29A, which includes portions of Dodge and Olmsted counties in the southeastern part of the state. A Republican, he is also a local business owner, manager, and consultant.

== Early life ==
Demmer graduated from Hayfield High School in Hayfield, then attended the University of Minnesota, earning his B.A. in agricultural business administration. He is a former 11-year board member and treasurer of the Hayfield School District.

== Minnesota legislature ==
Demmer was first elected in 2002, and was re-elected in 2004, 2006 and 2008. He was a member of the House's K-12 Education Policy and Oversight Committee, the Taxes Committee, and the Ways and Means Committee. He also served on the Finance subcommittees for the K-12 Education Finance Division and the Transportation Finance and Policy Division. He was assistant minority leader in the 2009-2010 Session.

== Political campaigns ==
=== 2008 ===
In 2008, he unsuccessfully sought the Republican Party's endorsement to run for the United States House of Representatives in Minnesota's 1st congressional district.

=== 2010 ===
In December 2009, he announced that he would again seek the Republican Party's endorsement for the congressional seat in 2010, challenging incumbent Democrat Tim Walz. On April 17, 2010, he received the GOP endorsement.
