= Jonathon Sharkey =

American perennial candidate

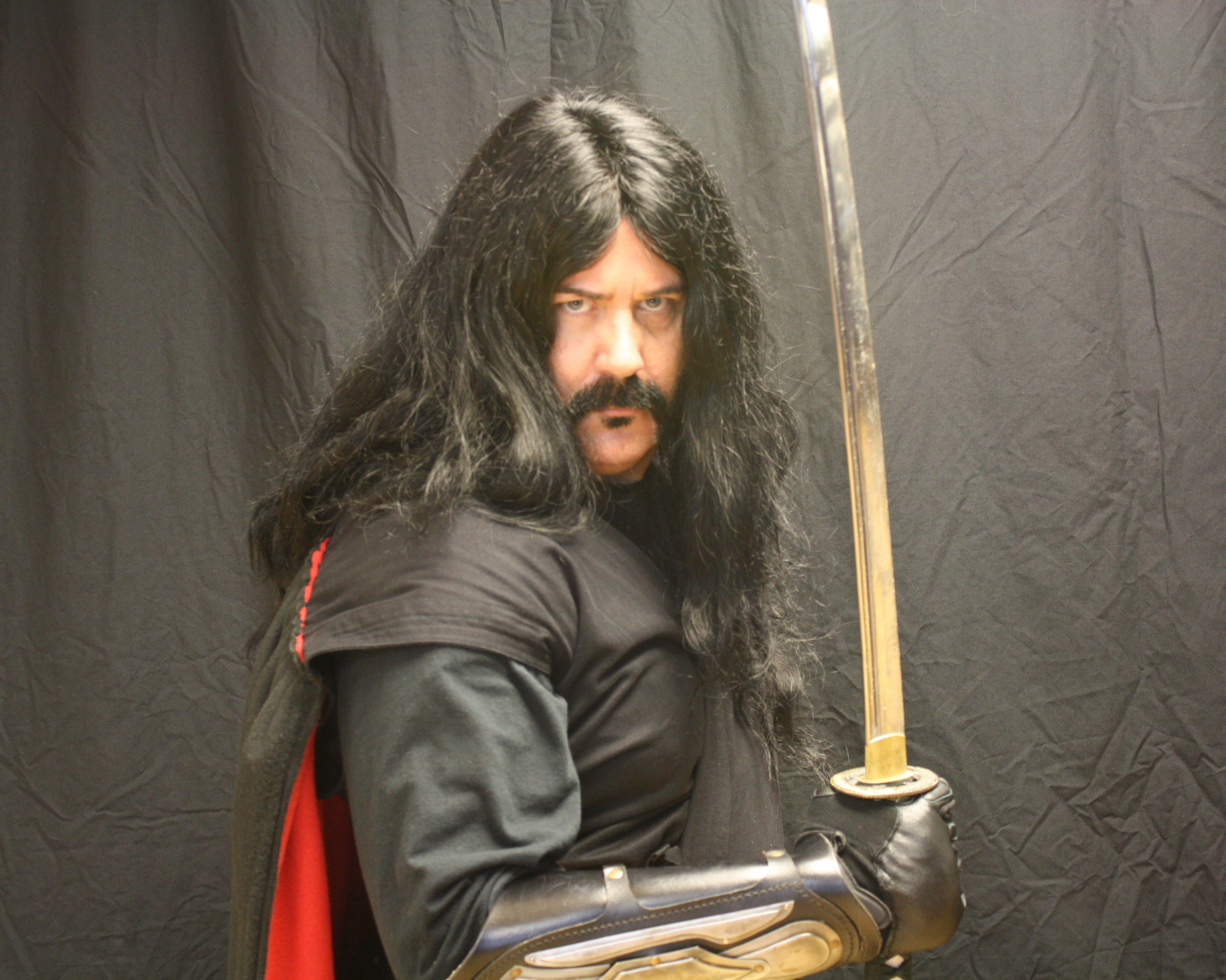
- Born: April 2, 1964 (age 62); Elizabeth, New Jersey, U.S.
- Other names: Rocky Adonis Flash, Lord Ares
- Known for: Perennial candidate, Professional wrestler
- Political party: Republican; Independent (2004, 2008); Reform (2000)
- Spouse: Oksana Shavaryn-Sharkey

Jonathon Tepes Sharkey (born John Albert Sharkey; April 2, 1964) is an American former professional wrestler and perennial candidate.

== Biography ==
Sharkey was born in Elizabeth, New Jersey and joined the United States Army in 1981. Following his discharge on medical grounds in 1983, he studied at Kansas State University. He has lived in Minnesota and resides in Florida. Sharkey has three living children, and a fourth child who is now deceased. He married Oksana Shavaryn in 2016.

=== Musician/actor ===
A drummer since the age of 5, as well as a guitarist, Sharkey is endorsed by Soultone Cymbals. He has recorded an album of Elvis Presley cover songs. He has also appeared in several films, both as an actor and as a soundtrack composer.

=== Wrestling career ===
Originally a boxer, Sharkey began wrestling in 1988. He began his career with Larry Sharpe's WWA promotion, facing "Diamond Jim" Brady in a boxer vs. wrestler match. Following this, he worked with a number of other wrestling promoters including Rocky Johnson, father of Dwayne "The Rock" Johnson. He cites his greatest wrestling influences as Ric Flair and Ricky Steamboat.

=== Vampirism ===
Sharkey says he first drank blood at age five and consumed the blood of his girlfriends and mistresses twice a week. He has described his vampirism as "a very healthy thing to do" and has praised Hollywood for making vampire feeding practices "romantic and erotic". He drinks only women's blood because "women are beautiful... they have such beautiful necks and arms". He says he is well known within the vampire community, and says he drinks cow and pig blood. While in Tennessee he reportedly attempted to set up a colony for vampires.

== Religious beliefs ==
Sharkey was a Luciferian who "turned against God" because he would not worship a God who "caused the deaths of innocent children" and "allowed his only son to be used as a sacrifice on the cross". He compares Lucifer to the Founding Fathers of the United States, arguing that they both exemplify the idea of rebellion against tyranny. He says he doesn't hate Jesus, just God the Father, and that he follows the goddess Hecate in addition to Lucifer.

== Politics ==
=== Political campaigns ===
Sharkey filed with the Federal Election Commission to run for President of the United States twice as an independent candidate (in 2004 and in 2008) and once as a Republican candidate (in 2012). He ran for Congress in at least three states—his home State of New Jersey (1999–2000, Republican), Indiana (Reform Party, 2000) and Florida (2001–02, Republican). In 2006, he ran for governor of Minnesota.

Sharkey once served on the Hillsborough County, Florida, Republican Party's executive committee. A. J. Matthews, who also served on the committee, described Sharkey as someone who believes in "Republican values" but said that Sharkey needs to focus on campaign issues rather than "extreme behaviors".

=== Political positions ===
Sharkey strongly criticized President George W. Bush, whom he described as a "wuss" and a communist who was responsible for the deaths of innocent Americans in Saudi Arabia and Iraq. He has expressed a desire to try, and convict, and impale Bush, and has since said that "Obama is even worse than Bush, and I never thought anyone could be worse than Bush. He has no idea how to run a country, nor should he be running a country."

Sharkey said that he would ban abortion and the teaching of evolution in public schools. On other social issues, he leans libertarian; he supported equal rights for gays. He opposed President Obama's health care reform and said that he would replace it with a plan of his own in which the poor would receive free medical and dental care; the expenses would be paid with government taxes on marijuana and prostitution, which Sharkey supports legalizing and regulating. On foreign policy, he wished to bring American troops home from foreign war zones. In keeping with his belief in the goddess Hecate, he supports environmentalism and "protecting Mother Earth". He said that his ideal running mate would be former New Jersey governor Christine Todd Whitman. During the 2012 election, he criticized Republican rival Michele Bachmann as "too flakey for me".

He described his policy on crime as follows: "Certain criminals, instead of being put in jail, they should be brutally tortured and impaled.... Upon them being found guilty of their crimes I'll beat them, torture them, dismember them and decapitate them." In an appearance on Tucker Carlson's television show, he agreed with the host's description of him as "not simply a vampire, [but] a right-wing vampire" and said his policy for dealing with drug dealers is to "go to Sicilian families and have them attack the drug dealers for me".

== Legal troubles ==
Sharkey was investigated by the United States Secret Service for threatening to impale President George W. Bush. Agents visited Sharkey at his home for questioning. A spokesman for the Secret Service said that he didn't believe the investigation was an overreaction.

He was also jailed in Tennessee for making threats against an Indiana judge. Investigators confiscated two rifles and a wooden stake with spikes at his house.

Sharkey's 2006 bid for Minnesota governor was cut short after Sharkey was arrested by Minnesota police on an outstanding Indiana arrest warrant, sent to Mille Lacs County jail and extradited to Indiana.

He has also been accused of "brainwashing" a 16-year-old girl in Minnesota, whose family sought a restraining order against him, and admitted to harassing another 16-year-old Minnesota girl online.

In 2010, the National Center for Missing & Exploited Children issued an alert after a 16-year-old girl, Paige Brewer, from Faribault, Minnesota ran away with Sharkey. The alert described Brewer as an "endangered runaway". Brewer's mother eventually won a court order keeping Sharkey away from her daughter, who was taken into custody by police and returned home.
