= Joseph G. Peschek =

American academic (born 1952)

Joseph G. Peschek (born June 30, 1952) is an American academic and professor of political science at Hamline University in St. Paul, Minnesota. In 1998, he was the Progressive Minnesota nominee for state auditor. Peschek's research specializes in contemporary American politics and democratic theory. He was the editor of the journal New Political Science from 2002 to 2008 and is frequent contributor to regional media on statewide and national political topics.

Peschek received his Bachelor of Arts from the University of Washington in 1974 and Ph.D. in political science from University of Massachusetts, Amherst in 1984. He is the author of Policy-Planning Organizations: Elite Agendas and America's Rightward Turn and Voices of Dissent: Critical Readings in American Politics.
