= 2006 Minnesota gubernatorial election =

- November 7, 2006
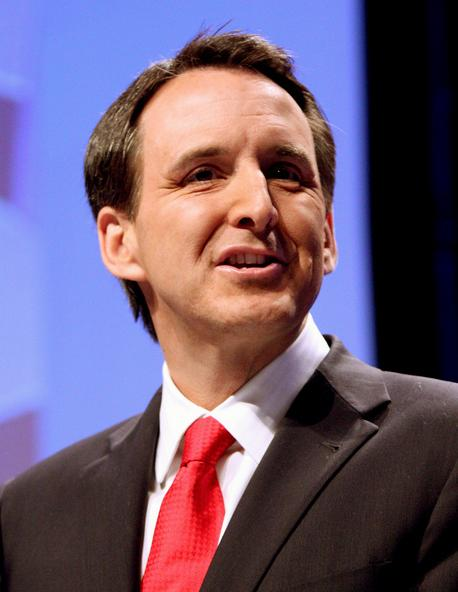

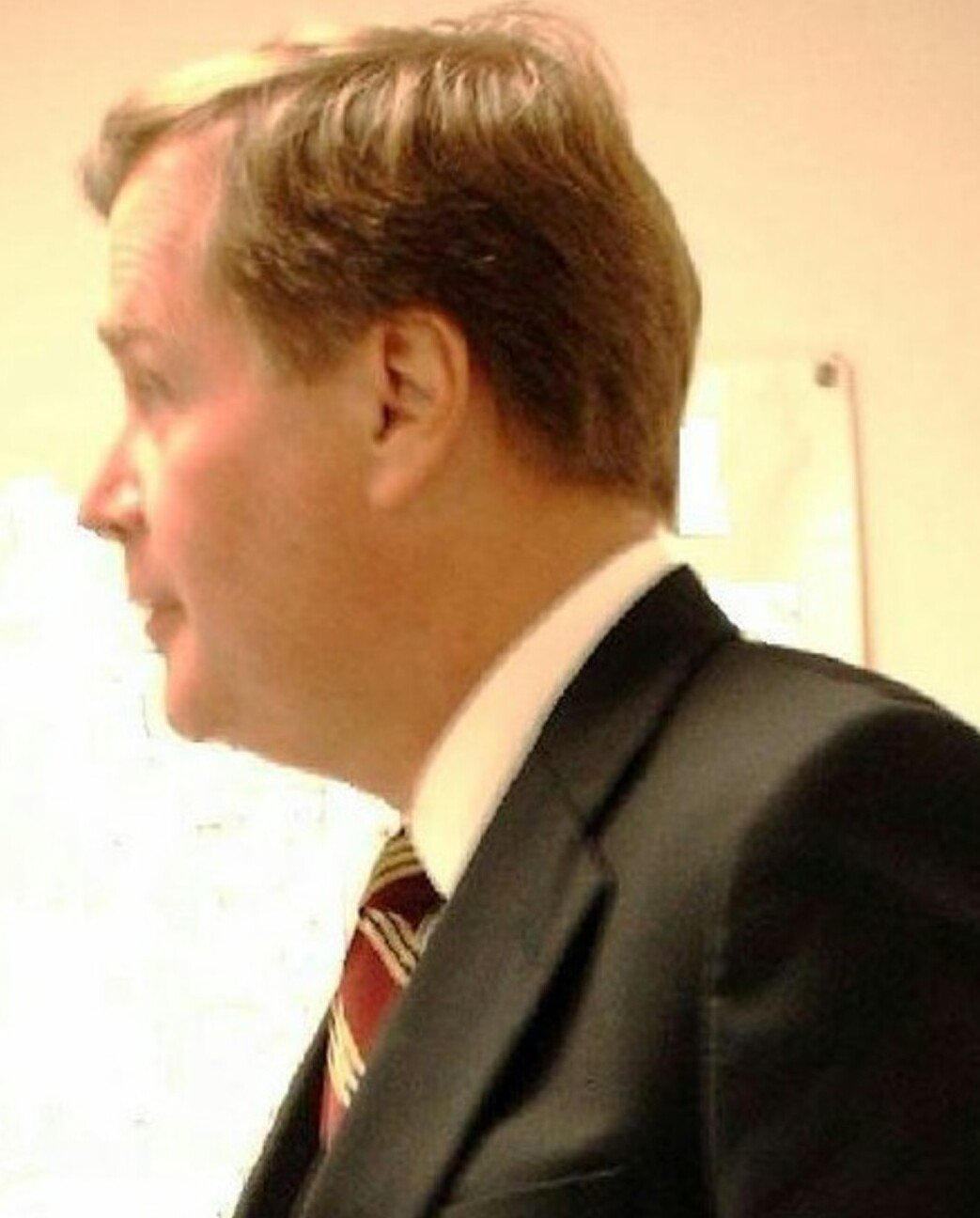

Nominee	Tim Pawlenty	Mike Hatch	Peter Hutchinson
Party	Republican	Democratic (DFL)	Independence
Running mate	Carol Molnau	Judi Dutcher	Maureen Reed
Popular vote	1,028,568	1,007,460	141,735
Percentage	46.69%	45.73%	6.43%
- Pawlenty: 40–50% 50–60% 60–70% 70–80% 80–90% >90% Hatch: 40–50% 50–60% 60–70% 70–80% 80–90% >90% Tie: 40–50% 50% No votes
Governor before election
Tim Pawlenty
Republican
Elected Governor
Tim Pawlenty
Republican

The 2006 Minnesota gubernatorial election took place on November 7, 2006 to elect the governor and lieutenant governor of Minnesota. Republican incumbent Tim Pawlenty was re-elected to a second term over Mike Hatch.

This was the closest race of the 2006 gubernatorial election cycle. As of 2026, this is the last time a Republican won a statewide race in Minnesota.

== Republican primary ==
=== Candidates ===
- Sue Jeffers, Minneapolis bar owner
  - Running mate: Ruth Hendrycks
- Tim Pawlenty, incumbent governor of Minnesota since 2003
  - Running mate: Carol Molnau, incumbent llieutenant governor of Minnesota since 2003

=== Campaign ===
Pawlenty was challenged by Sue Jeffers, a libertarian activist noted for her opposition for smoking bans and the use of eminent domain. Although Jeffers was cross-endorsed by the Libertarian Party and the Republican Liberty Caucus, Minnesota law does not allow fusion candidates. She did not participate in the party endorsement process but chose to run directly against Pawlenty in the September primary.

=== Results ===
Republican gubernatorial primary election, 2006
Party	Candidate	Votes	%
Republican	Tim Pawlenty (incumbent)	147,622	88.87
Republican	Sue Jeffers	18,490	11.13
Total votes		166,112	100.00

== DFL primary ==
=== Candidates ===
- Mike Hatch, Minnesota attorney general since 1999
  - Running mate: Judi Dutcher, Minnesota state auditor since 1995
- Becky Lourey, state senator
  - Running mate: Tim Baylor, businessman and former Minnesota Vikings defensive back
- Ole Savior, artist and perennial candidate
  - Running mate: Dan Fischer

==== Withdrawn ====
- Kelly Doran, real estate developer (withdrew March 24, 2006)
- Steve Kelley, state senator (withdrew June 10 following loss at convention; endorsed Hatch)
- Bud Philbrook, former state representative (1975–77) (withdrew October 24, 2005)

=== Campaign ===
Hatch received the strongest support of all candidates in the statewide precinct caucus straw poll and continued to hold his lead into the party convention, at which he received the endorsement after seven ballots. Lourey continued to seek the DFL nomination in the primary election. Ole Savior was eliminated on the first ballot after winning just one vote out of 1,500, but he continued to seek the nomination in the primary. Steve Kelley withdrew his candidacy on June 10, and endorsed Hatch.

=== Results ===
Democratic–Farmer–Labor gubernatorial primary election, 2006
Party	Candidate	Votes	%
Democratic (DFL)	Mike Hatch	231,643	73.20
Democratic (DFL)	Becky Lourey	77,430	24.47
Democratic (DFL)	Ole Savior	7,397	2.34
Total votes		316,470	100.00

== Independence primary ==
=== Candidates ===
- Pam Ellison, 2000 candidate for U.S. House of Representatives
  - Running mate: Kari Johnson
- Peter Hutchinson, former Minnesota commissioner of finance (1989–91) and superintendent of Minneapolis Public Schools (1993–97)
  - Running mate: Maureen Reed, former chair of the University of Minnesota Board of Regents

=== Campaign ===
Hutchinson won the Independence Party straw poll in March, and was endorsed at the June 24 convention.

=== Results ===
Independence gubernatorial primary election, 2006
Party	Candidate	Votes	%
Independence	Peter Hutchinson	7,725	66.09
Independence	Pam Ellison	3,964	33.91
Total votes		11,689	100.00

== General election ==
=== Candidates ===
- Walt E. Brown ("Quit Raising Taxes")
  - Running mate: Wesley C. Nelson
- Leslie Davis (American)
  - Running mate: Gregory K. Soderberg
- Mike Hatch, Minnesota attorney general since 1999 (DFL)
  - Running mate: Judi Dutcher, Minnesota state auditor since 1995
- Peter Hutchinson, former Minnesota commissioner of finance and superintendent of Minneapolis Public Schools (Independence)
  - Running mate: Maureen Reed, former chair of the University of Minnesota Board of Regents
- Tim Pawlenty, incumbent governor of Minnesota since 2003 (Republican)
  - Running mate: Carol Molnau, incumbent llieutenant governor of Minnesota since 2003
- Ken Pentel (Green)
  - Running mate: Danene Provencher

==== Withdrew ====
- Jonathon Sharkey, self-proclaimed vampire and perennial candidate

Sharkey's campaign was jeopardized on January 30, when he was arrested in Princeton, Minnesota on felony charges stemming from allegations in Indiana of stalking and flight. His campaign website was taken down, and it was discovered that the stalking charge had been dismissed on September 29, 2003, when Sharkey pleaded guilty to two counts of invasion of privacy and was ordered to submit to mental health treatment. On July 18, 2006, he was found not guilty of the felony escape charge. His arrest and jailing effectively terminated his campaign.

=== Campaign ===
After Pawlenty opted out of spending limits, Hatch followed suit. Outspending Hatch by $1 million, Pawlenty's campaign set a new spending record for a Minnesota gubernatorial campaign. The race was also affected by negative advertising by 527 groups, as well as issue-oriented groups opposing liberal causes in the state.

A major issue in the campaign that was considered to have hurt the DFL nominees was lieutenant gubernatorial candidate Judi Dutcher's response to a question about E-85. When asked about the impact of the gasoline alternative on the economies of rural Minnesota by then KSAX-TV anchor Corey Poppe, Dutcher was unable to comment, asking Poppe to define E-85. In the subsequent questioning about her response, gubernatorial candidate Mike Hatch reportedly called a Forum Communications reporter "a Republican whore" and promptly hung up the phone. Hatch claimed he had said "hack", not "whore", but the incident, occurring only three days before the last poll listed in this article, is believed to have swung the race. It put Hatch on the defensive in the campaign's last week.

Additionally, Pawlenty made illegal immigration an issue, running ads accusing Hatch of trying to give illegal immigrants college tuition. Hatch responded with an ad saying that illegal immigration laws had not been enforced under Pawlenty's tenure. Pawlenty also ran ads accusing Hatch of being responsible for raising health care costs, a claim Hatch disputed. Pawlenty campaigned on a record of leading the state through hard times, balancing record budget deficits without raising major state tax rates or diminishing the state's "nation-leading" status on most socioeconomic indicators.

=== Predictions ===
Source	Ranking	As of
The Cook Political Report	Tossup	November 6, 2006
Sabato's Crystal Ball	Tilt D (flip)	November 6, 2006
Rothenberg Political Report	Tossup	November 2, 2006
Real Clear Politics	Tossup	November 6, 2006

=== Polling ===
==== Two-way ====
Source	Date	Mike Hatch (DFL)	Tim Pawlenty (R)	Undecided
University of Minnesota	October 28, 2006	45%	39%	7%
Mason-Dixon	October 27, 2006	44%	43%	7%
St. Cloud State University	October 27, 2006	46%	36%	7%
Rasmussen	October 25, 2006	45%	44%	2%
Zogby/WSJ	October 19, 2006	45%	45%	
Rasmussen	October 4, 2006	50%	46%	2%
Zogby/WSJ	September 11, 2006	42%	41%	
Gallup	September 5, 2006	44%	43%	
Zogby/WSJ	July 24, 2006	43%	43%	
Star Tribune Minnesota Poll	July 15, 2006	41%	43%	
Rasmussen	June 30, 2006	47%	42%	
Zogby/WSJ	June 21, 2006	40%	45%	
Rasmussen	May 10, 2006	49%	39%	
Rasmussen	February 28, 2006	45%	40%	
Rasmussen	January 29, 2006	44%	47%	

==== Three-way ====
Source	Date	Mike Hatch (DFL)	Tim Pawlenty (R)	Peter Hutchinson (IP)	Undecided
Star Tribune Minnesota Poll	November 4, 2006	45%	40%	7%	7%
Star Tribune Minnesota Poll	October 14, 2006	46%	37%	7%	6%
Survey USA	September 28, 2006	44%	45%	6%	3%
Pioneer Press/MPR Poll	September 22, 2006	39%	42%	5%	11%
The Humphrey Institute	September 21, 2006	44%	42%	6%	5%
Star Tribune Minnesota Poll	September 16, 2006	42%	42%	7%	5%
Rasmussen	September 1, 2006	39%	45%	7%	
Zogby/WSJ	August 28, 2006	43%	41%	5–9%	
Rasmussen	August 7, 2006	36%	46%	6%	
Survey USA	July 24, 2006	36%	50%	8%	

==== Debate and forum ====
2006 Minnesota gubernatorial election debate & candidate forum
No.	Date	Host	Moderator	Link	Republican	DFL	Independence
Key: P Participant A Absent N Not invited I Invited W Withdrawn							
Key: P Participant A Absent N Not invited I Invited W Withdrawn					Tim Pawlenty	Mike Hatch	Peter Hutchinson
1	Oct. 29, 2006	KSTP-TV; League of Women Voters Minnesota Education Fund	Tom Hauser		P	P	P
2	Nov. 3, 2006	Almanac; WCCO (AM)	Eric Eskola; Cathy Wurzer	C-SPAN	P	P	P

=== Results ===
On November 7, Tim Pawlenty narrowly won the general election, 46.7 percent to 45.7 percent. Hutchinson won 6.4 percent of the vote.

Pawlenty won by piling up large margins in suburban counties as well as in central and southern Minnesota regions anchored by St. Cloud and Rochester. In his victory speech, noting that he would have to deal with a DFL House and Senate, Pawlenty said it was "a time tonight to be humble and time to be grateful." He promised that "the next four years are going to be different than the last four years" and that he would build "a common agenda" with the DFL candidates who swept legislative and constitutional offices.

Hatch ran ahead in Minneapolis, St. Paul and their inner-ring suburbs, and won by large margins around Duluth and the Iron Range. In his concession speech, Hatch advocated that legislators get back to "sitting down and getting to know each other in private" to establish common ground for bipartisan legislation and called for an end to partisan rancor.

County results for the Independence Party: Hutchinson: <4%%; 4-5%; 5-6%; 6-7%; 7-8%; 8%<

Minnesota gubernatorial election, 2006
Party	Candidate	Votes	%
Republican	Tim Pawlenty (incumbent)	1,028,568	46.69
Democratic (DFL)	Mike Hatch	1,007,460	45.73
Independence	Peter Hutchinson	141,735	6.43
Green	Ken Pentel	10,800	0.49
Independent	Walt E. Brown	9,649	0.44
American	Leslie Davis	3,776	0.17
Write-in		949	0.04
Total votes		2,202,937	100.00
Republican hold			

==== Counties that flipped from Republican to Democratic ====
- Blue Earth (largest city: Mankato)
- Grant (largest city: Elbow Lake)
- Aitkin (largest city: Aitkin)
- Pine (largest city: Pine City)
- Rice (largest city: Faribault)
- Winona (largest city: Winona)

==== Counties that flipped from Independence to Republican ====
- Dodge (largest city: Kasson)
- Faribault (largest city: Blue Earth)
- Waseca (largest city: Waseca)
- Olmsted (largest city: Rochester)

==== Counties that flipped from Democratic to Republican ====
- Yellow Medicine (largest city: Granite Falls)
- Lake of the Woods (largest city: Baudette)

==== Counties that flipped from Independence to Democratic ====
- Fillmore (largest city: Spring Valley)
- Freeborn (largest city: Albert Lea)
- Mower (largest city: Austin)

== See also ==
- 2006 United States gubernatorial elections
- List of Minnesota gubernatorial elections
