= Maureen Reed =

- Reed in 2009
- Born: April 10, 1953 (age 73); Redwood Falls, Minnesota
- Education: University of Minnesota; Minnesota Medical School
- Occupation: Physician
- Known for: Candidate for the U.S. House of Representatives
- Spouse(s): Jim Hart, MD

Maureen Reed (born April 10, 1953) is a physician who was the chair of the Board of Regents of the University of Minnesota, Director of the Parks and Trails Council of Minnesota, Medical Director and Vice-President of the not-for-profit health care provider HealthPartners, and Executive Director of the Nobel Peace Prize Forum. She ran as a Democrat in the sixth congressional district of Minnesota in 2010.

== Early life ==
Reed was born to a family that lost their farm in the Great Depression, and she grew up in Redwood Falls, Minnesota, a small rural town in south-western Minnesota. Her father worked for the local Ford dealership. She married Jim Hart, and they have lived in Grant, Minnesota since 1981.

== Career ==
Reed graduated with a B.A. from the University of Minnesota in 1975 and from the University of Minnesota Medical School in 1979. She did part of her medical training at the VA hospital in Minneapolis, completing her residency in Internal Medicine at the University of Minnesota in 1982. For the next eleven years she practiced internal medicine at the Aspen Medical Group and served as president of the group from 1991-1992. In 1993, she became the vice president and medical director of HealthPartners, a position she held until 2004. She continued to practice part-time internal medicine at the Fremont Community Clinic in north Minneapolis, a clinic serving primarily uninsured and under-insured patients. During her tenure as vice president and medical director at HealthPartners (1993–2004), Reed created and implemented an outcomes-based payment approach (Outcomes Recognition Program) for primary care groups, specialty care groups, and hospitals. She also led the team whose measurement efforts subsequently spawned the Minnesota Community Measurement.

In the 1980s and 1990s Reed traveled with her husband to East Africa to study and review rural public health projects. On one trip to Uganda, she and a team from HealthPartners worked with local dairy farmers to develop a plan that allowed them to pool their resources and provide better access to health care.

The Minnesota Legislature elected Reed to serve on the University of Minnesota's Board of Regents in 1997 and 2003. She was the vice chair of the audit committee (1997), vice chair of the Education Planning and Policy Committee (1997–1999), chair of the Education Planning and Policy Committee (2003–2005), board vice chair (1999–2001), and board chair (2001–2003).

She served as the interim executive director of the Parks and Trails Council of Minnesota (an environmental non-profit organization which manages a revolving land trust of 10,000 acres (40 km^{2}) across the state) from May 2008 to November 2008.

Reed is a member of the Medical Reserve Corps and was deployed in the aftermaths of the 2005 Louisiana Hurricanes Katrina and Rita and the 2007 Interstate 35-W bridge collapse. She was the Independence Party of Minnesota's candidate for lieutenant governor in 2006. She served on the Minnesota Governor's Health Care Transformation Task Force in 2007-2008.

In 2011 Reed became the Executive Director of the Nobel Peace Prize Forum, recasting it as a high-tech international event, securing participation by multiple Nobel Laureates (including the Dalai Lama, Mohammad Yunus, President Jimmy Carter), and surpassing the Norwegian Nobel Institute's attendance, publicity, program and mission goals. She resigned from the Forum in 2014 and subsequently joined the teaching faculty of Gustavus Adolphus College and the University of Minnesota Undergraduate Honors Program.

== 2010 Congressional campaign ==
Reed ran as a Democrat for the 6th Congressional District seat held by Republican Michele Bachmann. She withdrew from the race after the district convention, having raised over one million dollars. She continued to champion education and health care reform.

Party political offices
Preceded by Martha Robertson	Independence nominee for Lieutenant Governor of Minnesota; 2006	Succeeded by Jim Mulder
