= Forward Independence Party =

Political party in Minnesota, US

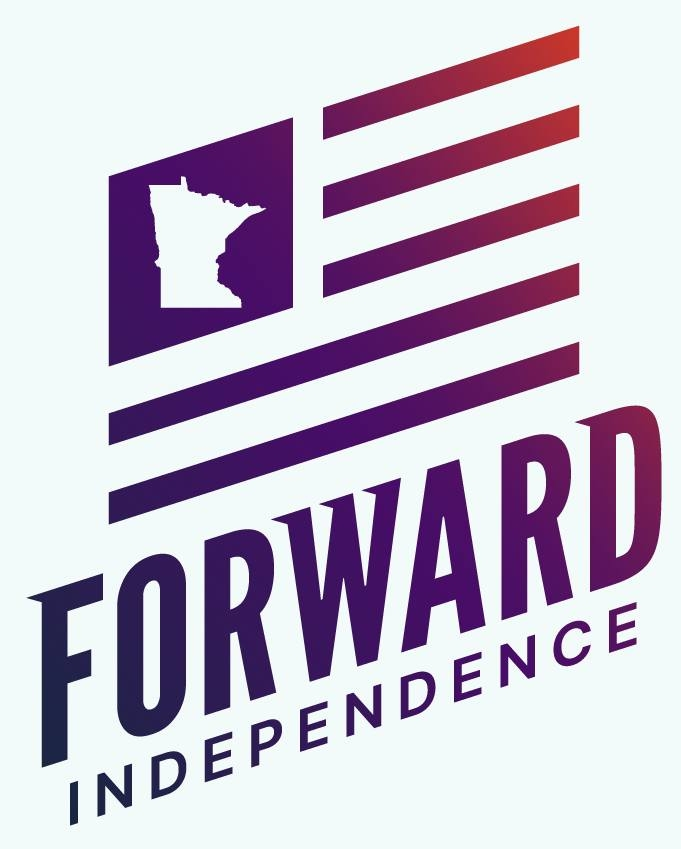
- Chairman: Philip Fuehrer
- Founded: 1992; 34 years ago (as the Independence Party of Minnesota)
- Ideology: Classical liberalism Radical centrism
- Political position: Center
- National affiliation: Forward Party (since 2025); Alliance Party (2019–2025); Independence Party (2008); Reform Party (1996–2000)
- Colors: Purple
- State Senate: 0 / 67
- State House: 0 / 134
- U.S. Senate: 0 / 2
- U.S. House: 0 / 8

Website
- www.forwardindependencemn.org

The Forward Independence Party, a reverse merger of the Forward Party of Minnesota and the Independence-Alliance Party of Minnesota, formerly the Independence Party, and also formerly the Reform Party of Minnesota (1996–2000), is a political party in the U.S. state of Minnesota. It was the party of former Minnesota governor Jesse Ventura when he left the Reform Party.

Originally an affiliate of the Reform Party, the IPM was later affiliated with the Independence Party of America and for a time had no national affiliation. But between 2019 and 2025, it was affiliated with the Alliance Party. The party has fielded candidates for most state-wide races and was considered a major party by the state from 1994 to 2014. It lost that status when none of its state-wide candidates won 5% of the vote in the 2014 gubernatorial election.

The party, which was represented in the U.S. Senate by Dean Barkley in 2002–2003, nominated former U.S. Representative Tim Penny as its candidate in the 2002 gubernatorial election, Peter Hutchinson in 2006 and Tom Horner in 2010.

== History ==
=== Early Independence and Reform parties ===
Phil Madsen and other Ross Perot supporters formed the Independence Party of Minnesota in Bloomington, Minnesota, on July 22, 1992. Dean Barkley ran for a seat in the United States House of Representatives in the 1992 election.

Other supporters led by Don Dow, State Director, and Victoria Staten, Assistant State Director and Ross Perot's spokesperson on NAFTA, worked as part of United We Stand America, and some eventually found their way to the Independence Party after the elections. Over the following years, the party began to field candidates in other state races.

On June 22, 1996, the party affiliated with the Reform Party of the United States of America and became the Reform Party of Minnesota (RPMN).

Bob Lessard of International Falls joined the party in 2001 after he was re-elected to the Minnesota Senate as an independent with 54.3% of the vote. Sheila Kiscaden, a incumbent Republican, was reelected to the state senate in 2002 with the party's nomination after she failed to win the Republican nomination.

=== Return to the Independence Party ===
The state party carried the Reform Party of Minnesota name until it disaffiliated from the national party in 2000 due to factional dissent and the increasing influence of Pat Buchanan within the national organization. The party immediately changed its name back to Independence Party on March 4, 2000. After his most influential opponents left the party, Buchanan went on to become the national Reform Party's candidate for president.

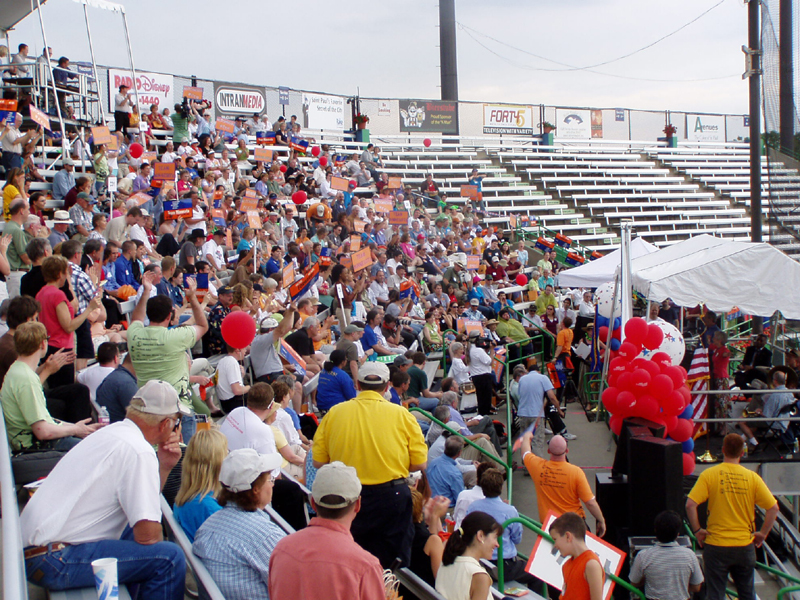
Independence Party of Minnesota's 2006 convention at Midway Stadium

On 2004's Super Tuesday, March 2, the party held caucuses around the state along with Minnesota's other three parties. Since the organization had no national party affiliation, it merely ran a straw poll to gauge the opinions of members with regard to the available presidential candidates in the 2004 election. For the poll, the group used instant-runoff voting, a voting method that has been gaining interest in the state. Additionally, the party had several fairly progressive agenda items to vote on. For a bit of levity, there was also a vote on the mascot to use for the party. Three top possibilities were the bison, hawk, and white buffalo. Technology was also involved in the IPM's caucusing, as it used the Internet to conduct a two-day online "virtual caucus" for people who were unable to attend the evening of Super Tuesday.

On March 5, 2004, the party announced that the presidential winner was John Edwards, who had privately circulated his decision to withdraw shortly before IP members voted. The Super Tuesday ballot was probably the first statewide experiment in instant-runoff voting. The Bison, to be named Indy, won the mascot vote, out-polling the nearest competitors by a 19% margin.

In May 2005, Peter Hutchinson, who was Minnesota Finance Commissioner in the Rudy Perpich administration, announced that he was planning to seek the Independence Party's nomination for governor in the 2006 election. Hutchinson finished 3rd of 6 earning 141,735 votes for 6.4% of the total vote.

In the 2006 elections, IP 5th district congressional candidate Tammy Lee received 51,456 votes for 21.01% of the total vote. Lee's strong showing resulted in part from her unusually strong (for third parties) fundraising, Lee raised $228,938 for her run.

In May 2008, a "Draft Dean Barkley" movement started on the web to encourage the former senator to run again. He accepted, and finished third, winning a significant 15% of all votes cast. His candidacy had a significant impact on a race in which the eventual winner Al Franken and then-incumbent Senator Norm Coleman were separated by only 312 votes. Two other federal candidates, David Dillon in the 3rd congressional district and Bob Anderson in the 6th congressional district, received 10% of the vote in their races. 2008 is the high-water mark for the Minnesota Independence Party in both the number of federal candidates running and the percent of vote received—both key measures of the base of support.

In 2010, gubernatorial candidate Tom Horner, a former public relations executive and chief of staff to U.S. Senator David Durenberger received 12% of the vote, nearly doubling the total of previous IP gubernatorial candidate Peter Hutchinson. Horner polled as high as 18% in the weeks leading up to the election, but was significantly outspent by the GOP and DFL candidates and the third-party expenditure groups supporting their candidacies. Horner did receive endorsement from three of the state's five living ex-governors: Republicans Arne Carlson and Al Quie as well as Ventura. Former U.S. Senate candidate and prominent Minnesota attorney Mike Ciresi also endorsed Horner. Most Minnesota newspapers including the Star Tribune, St. Paul Pioneer Press, St. Cloud Times, Duluth News Tribune, and Rochester Post-Bulletin, as well as North Dakota's Grand Forks Herald endorsed the IP candidate.

In 2014, the Independence Party endorsed several candidates for state and national office: Hannah Nicollet for governor, Kevin Terrell for U.S. Senate, attorney Brandan Borgos for Minnesota Attorney General, whistleblower Pat Dean for state auditor, Bob Helland for secretary of state, John Denney for U.S. congress CD-6, Paula Overby for U.S. congress CD-2 and Iraq War veteran Dave Thomas for U.S. congress CD-4.

In 2016, the party endorsed Evan McMullin, a former CIA agent and former chief policy director for the House Republican Conference, for President.

=== Forward Party merger ===
In 2025, the Independence Party merged with the Minnesota affiliate of the Forward Party and became the "Forward Independence Party of Minnesota".

== Platform ==
Historically, the Independence Party of Minnesota tended to lean conservative with regards to taxation and other fiscal matters. For example, "personal responsibility" is a core principle of the party as is a "[G]overnment that is fiscally responsible: equitable in its collection of taxes, careful in its spending, and honest in its financial reporting." Many IP candidates have campaigned for tax reform that produces more stable revenues for the state. The IP platform states, "We support government budgets that are structurally balanced and avoid shifting of expenses or borrowing to make them appear balanced."

In social policy the party tends to take more liberal-libertarian positions on issues such as abortion, gay marriage, and civil rights and liberties. One of its core principles is that "All citizens deserve equal rights, protection, and opportunity under the law. In our party and public affairs, we are ever vigilant to promote only those rules and laws which assure equity and freedom for all citizens."

Jesse Ventura described the party, as well as his own personal philosophy, as "fiscally conservative and socially liberal".

At the party's state convention in 2012, delegates passed three new resolutions. One addressed the party's opposition to raiding dedicated state funds to balance general obligations. A second expressed frustration with the overuse of constitutional amendments. A third proposed eliminating legislative pay in the event of a state shutdown like the one that occurred in the summer of 2011. Party delegates also adopted two standing resolutions against both the marriage amendment and the voter ID amendment on the state ballot in November 2012.

During the 2013 IP convention, the body amended the party platform to support the legalization, taxation and regulation of marijuana. Delegates also lifted the party's prohibition on receiving money from political action committees, citing the need to instead fight for transparency and accountability in Minnesota campaign spending in the aftermath of Citizens United.

== Partners ==
The Independence Party of Minnesota joined the Minnesotans United for All Families coalition in 2011 after chair Mark Jenkins announced the party's official opposition to the marriage amendment, citing the party's own platform in its opposition.

The IP is also a longtime supporter of ranked choice voting (RCV) and FairVote Minnesota, which seeks to expand RCV throughout Minnesota. The party uses RCV to conduct intraparty endorsements including delegates' decision to "not endorse" for U.S. Senate in 2012.

Following the party's official vote to oppose the 2012 voter ID amendment, the campaign seeking to defeat the amendment, "Our Vote, Our Future", announced former IP gubernatorial candidate Tim Penny as one of its campaign co-chairs. Another former IP gubernatorial candidate, Tom Horner, was named as a member of the group's advisory committee.

On May 4, 2019, the Independence Party of Minnesota merged with Alliance Party, joining other third parties including the Modern Whig Party, the American Party of South Carolina, and the American Moderates.

The Independence-Alliance Party of Minnesota and Forward Party of Minnesota merged in conventions on July 26, 2025. The new name is Forward Independence. There was some confusion, as the Independence-Alliance Party of Minnesota was affiliated with the Alliance Party on the national level. State Independence-Alliance Party officials said they would continue a "dual national affiliation" until the 2027 party convention by which time they hope both national branches will merge. In the end, they decided to have a "collaborative relationship" with the Alliance Party and encourage national merger talks. The parties agreed to merge in a reverse merger with the Forward name merging into the Independence party legal structure.

== Electoral history ==
=== U.S. Senate ===
Class 1
Year	Candidate	Votes	%	Won
2000	No Candidate			
2006	Robert Fitzgerald	71,194	3.2	No
2012	Stephen Williams	73,539	2.6	No
2018	No Candidate			
2024	Joyce Lynne Lacey	46,377	1.4	No

Class 2
Year	Candidate	Votes	%	Won
2002	Jim Moore	45,139	2.0	No
2008	Dean Barkley	437,505	15.2	No
2014	Steve Carlson	47,530	2.4	No
2018 (sp)	No Candidate			
2020	No Candidate			
2026	No Candidate			

=== Governor ===
Governor
Year	Candidate	Votes	%	Won
1998	Jesse Ventura	773,713	36.99	Yes
2002	Tim Penny	364,534	16.2	No
2006	Peter Hutchinson	141,735	6.43	No
2010	Tom Horner	251,487	11.94	No
2014	Hannah Nicollet	56,900	2.88	No
2018	No Candidate			
2022	Hugh McTavish	18,156	0.72	No
2026	Mike Newcome	(withdrawn)		

Secretary of State
Year	Candidate	Votes	%	Won
1998	No Candidate			
2002	Dean Alger	104,799	4.8	No
2006	Joel Spoonheim	64,489	3.0	No
2010	Jual Carlson	105,675	5.1	No
2014	Bob Helland	94,065	4.9	No
2018	William Denney	103,610	4.0	No
2022	No Candidate			
2026	No Candidate			

Auditor
Year	Candidate	Votes	%	Won
1998	No Candidate			
2002	Dave Hutcheson	164,532	7.7	No
2006	Lucy Gerold	97,076	4.6	No
2010	No Candidate			
2014	Patrick Dean	76,845	4.0	No
2018	No Candidate			
2022	No Candidate			
2026	Jay Reeves	79,000	2.8	No

Attorney General
Year	Candidate	Votes	%	Won
1998	Jim Mangan	116,481	5.8	No
2002	Dale Nathan	96,817	4.4	No
2006	John James	86,032	5.0	No
2010	Bill Dahn	102,865	5.0	No
2014	Brandan Borgos	44,613	2.3	No
2018	No Candidate			
2022	No Candidate			
2026	No Candidate			

== Presidential tickets ==
Year	Presidential nominee	National Affiliation	Votes in Minnesota
1992	Endorsed Ross Perot	Independent	23.96%
1996	Ross Perot	Reform Party	11.75%
2000	Pat Buchanan	Reform Party	0.91%
2004	No Endorsement		
2008	No Endorsement		
2012	No Endorsement		
2016	Evan McMullin	Independent	1.80%
2020	Rockey De La Fuente	Alliance Party	0.17%
2024	No Endorsement		

== Notable members ==
- Dean Barkley – U.S. Senator from Minnesota: 2002–2003 (Appointed by Ventura to fill a vacancy due to Paul Wellstone's death).
- Tim Penny – Former Democratic Congressman and 2002 Independence Party candidate for governor.
- Mae Schunk – Lt. Governor of Minnesota: 1999–2003.
- Jesse Ventura – Governor of Minnesota: 1999–2003.

== Officers ==
- Philip Fuehrer, State Chair
- Ben Thome, state director
- Sally Paulsen, state treasurer
- Jan Beliveau, state secretary

== See also ==
- Politics of Minnesota
- List of political parties in Minnesota

== Works cited ==
- Freeze, Melanie (2020). Beyond Donkeys and Elephants: Minor Political Parties in Contemporary American Politics. University Press of Kansas. doi:10.2307/j.ctv15tt76n. ISBN 978-0-7006-2929-9.
