= Senator Solon =

Senator Solon may refer to:

- Sam Solon (1931–2001), Minnesota State Senate
- Yvonne Prettner Solon (born 1946), Minnesota State Senate
