= 2010 Minnesota gubernatorial election =

- November 2, 2010
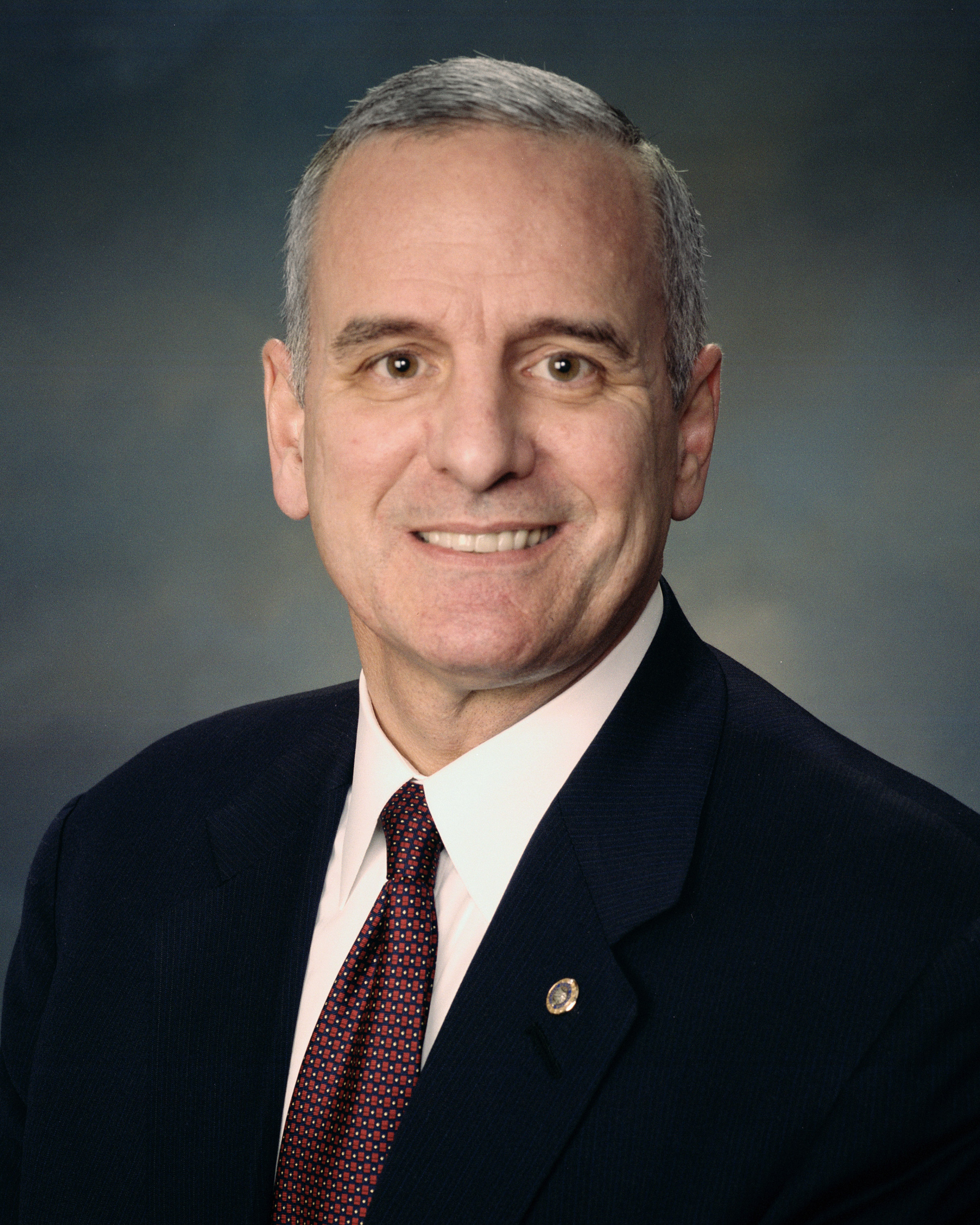

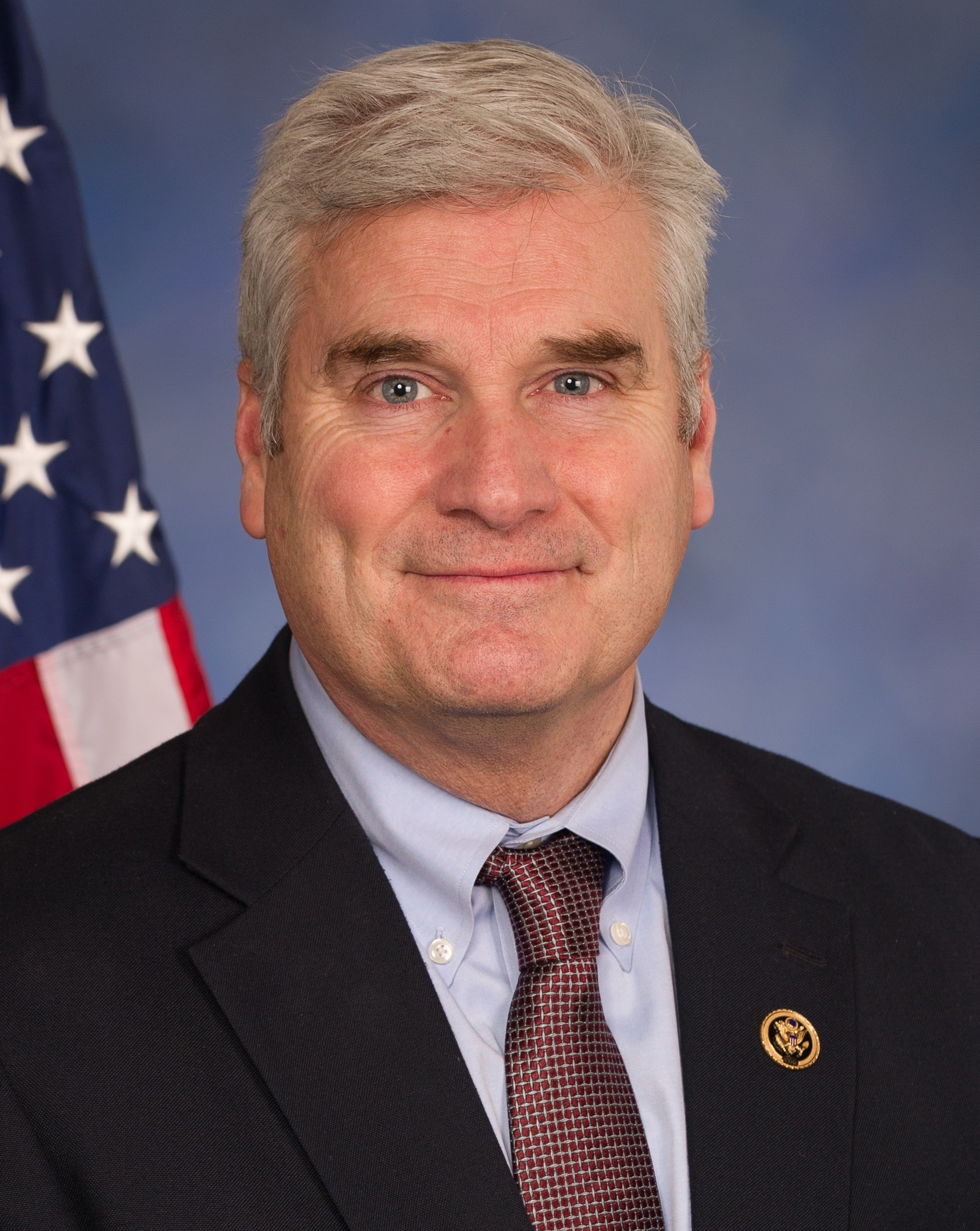

Nominee	Mark Dayton	Tom Emmer	Tom Horner
Party	Democratic (DFL)	Republican	Independence
Running mate	Yvonne Prettner Solon	Annette Meeks	Jim Mulder
Popular vote	919,232	910,462	251,487
Percentage	43.63%	43.21%	11.94%
- Dayton: 30–40% 40–50% 50–60% 60–70% 70–80% 80–90% >90% Emmer: 30–40% 40–50% 50–60% 60–70% 70–80% 80–90% >90% Horner: 30–40% 40–50% 60–70% >90% Tie: 30–40% 40–50% 50% No votes
Governor before election
Tim Pawlenty
Republican
Elected Governor
Mark Dayton
Democratic (DFL)

The 2010 Minnesota gubernatorial election was held on November 2, 2010, to elect the governor and lieutenant governor of Minnesota. Republican incumbent Tim Pawlenty declined to seek a third term in office. In the open race to succeed him, Mark Dayton narrowly defeated state representative Tom Emmer.

This was the first time the Democrats won the governorship since Rudy Perpich won re-election in 1986. With a margin of 0.4% (or 8,770 votes), this election was the closest race of the 2010 gubernatorial election cycle.

== Background ==
Republican Tim Pawlenty was elected governor of Minnesota in 2002 and re-elected in 2006. However, he announced in June 2009 that he would not seek a third term in office.

== Republican primary ==
=== Candidates ===
- Bob Carney Jr., inventor
  - Running mate: William McGaughey
- Leslie Davis, environmental activist
  - Running mate: Gregory K. Soderberg
- Tom Emmer, state representative from Delano
  - Running mate: Annette Meeks, member of the Metropolitan Council
- Ole Savior, perennial candidate, artist, poet
  - Running mate: Todd "Elvis" Anderson, Elvis impersonator

==== Withdrew ====
- Patricia Anderson, former Minnesota state auditor
- Bill Haas, former state representative and former mayor of Champlin
- David Hann, state senator
- Phil Herwig, activist
- Mike Jungbauer, state senator and former mayor of East Bethel
- Paul Kohls, state representative
- Marty Seifert, state representative and former House minority leader (following defeat at state convention)

==== Declined ====
- Laura Brod, state representative
- Norm Coleman, former U.S. senator and former mayor of St. Paul
- Paul Koering, state senator
- Tim Pawlenty, incumbent governor of Minnesota since 2003
- Jim Ramstad, former U.S. representative
- Brian Sullivan, businessman
- Steve Sviggum, Minnesota commissioner of labor and industry and former speaker of the Minnesota House
- Charlie Weaver, former commissioner of Public Safety

=== Campaign ===
The open race attracted a large field of candidates. At the Republican off-year state convention in October 2009, former state representative Marty Seifert won straw poll with 37 percent of the vote, ahead of state representative Tom Emmer with 23 percent, and Patricia Anderson with 14 percent. The rest of the participating candidates received less than 10 percent each.

On February 2, 2010, at the precinct caucuses to elect delegates to the 2010 state convention, Seifert won another straw poll of caucus attendees with 50 percent of the vote, followed by Emmer with 39 percent. However, the elected delegates were more closely divided between Emmer and Seifert than the straw poll indicated, and both campaigns claimed a delegate lead throughout the process leading up to the state convention, but the outcome was uncertain and was ultimately decided on the convention floor.

=== Convention results ===
On April 30, Emmer won the Republican endorsement at the state convention in Minneapolis, taking 56 percent of the vote on the second ballot. After the convention, Seifert withdrew and threw his support to Emmer. Emmer chose Metropolitan Council member Annette Meeks as his running mate for lieutenant governor.

=== Results ===
Emmer won the August 10 primary easily, earning a spot on the November ballot.

Republican primary results
Party	Candidate	Votes	%
Republican	Tom Emmer	107,558	82.5
Republican	Bob Carney Jr.	9,856	7.6
Republican	Leslie Davis	8,598	6.6
Republican	Ole Savior	4,396	3.4
Total votes		130,408	100

== Democratic–Farmer–Labor primary ==
=== Candidates ===
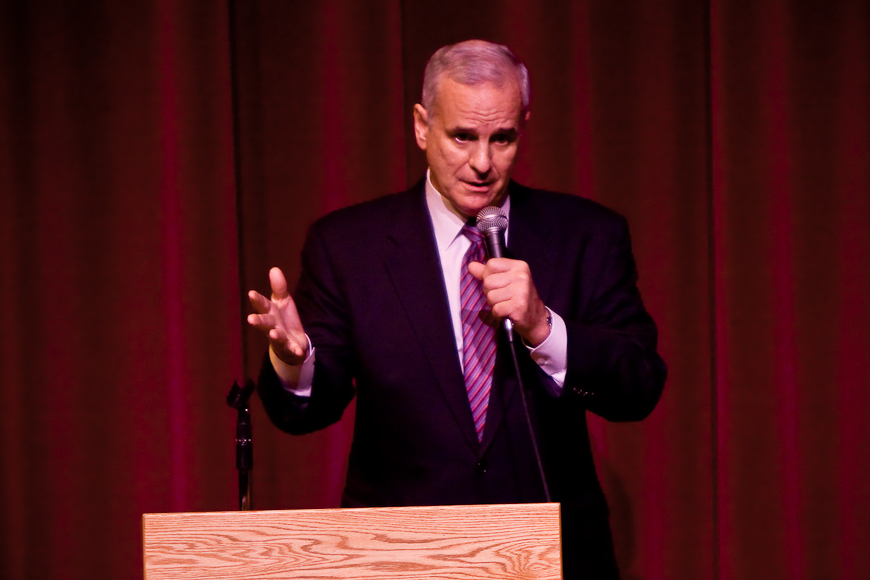
Candidate Mark Dayton speaking at a debate, 2009

- Mark Dayton, former U.S. senator
  - Running mate: Yvonne Prettner Solon, state senator
- Matt Entenza, former Minnesota House minority leader
  - Running mate: Robyne Robinson, former television personality
- Peter Idusogie
  - Running mate: Lady Jayne Fontaine
- Margaret Anderson Kelliher, speaker of the Minnesota House of Representatives
  - Running mate: John Gunyou, Minnetonka city manager

==== Withdrew ====
- Tom Bakk, state senator(following precinct caucuses)
- Susan Gaertner, Ramsey County attorney
- Steve Kelley, former state senator (following precinct caucuses)
- John Marty, state senator and 1994 gubernatorial nominee (following first convention ballot)
  - Running mate: Patricia Torres Ray, state senator
- Tom Rukavina, state representative
- R. T. Rybak, Minneapolis mayor
- Paul Thissen, state representative

==== Declined ====
- Chris Coleman, mayor of Saint Paul
- Mike Opat, chairman of the Hennepin County Board of Commissioners

=== Campaign ===
Ahead of the February 2 precinct caucuses, over more than eleven candidates submitted their names for consideration. Notably, former U.S. senator Mark Dayton declined to be included on the straw poll ballot. R. T. Rybak won the straw poll with 21.8 percent of the vote over Margaret Anderson Kelliher with 20.1 percent. "Uncommitted" received 14.7 percent, and other candidates each received single-digit support. As a result of poor showings in the caucus straw poll and slim odds of securing the party endorsement, Steve Kelley and Tom Bakk withdrew from the race.

==== Convention results ====
On April 24, the state convention was held in Duluth. John Marty withdrew after the first ballot, and Tom Rukavina withdrew after the fourth ballot, endorsing Kelliher. Paul Thissen withdrew after the fifth ballot. Before the sixth ballot results were announced, Rybak withdrew and endorsed Kelliher. Susan Gaertner, who had not sought the party endorsement but was planning to run in the primary, dropped out two days later, leaving a field composed of Dayton, Kelliher, and former House minority leader Matt Entenza.

All three candidates announced their running mates shortly after the end of the 2010 legislative session. On May 21, Kelliher announced that John Gunyou would be her running mate. On May 24, Dayton announced Yvonne Prettner Solon as his running mate. On May 27, Entenza announced Robyne Robinson as his running mate.

=== Polling ===
Poll source	Dates administered	Margin of error	Mark Dayton	Matt Entenza	Margaret Anderson Kelliher	Undecided
Survey USA	August 2–4, 2010	4.5%	43%	22%	27%	8%
Minnesota Poll	July 26–29, 2010	7.3%	40%	17%	30%	13%
Survey USA	June 14–16, 2010	4.5%	39%	22%	26%	11%
Humphrey Institute /MPR	May 13–16, 2010	8.75%	38%	6%	28%	28%

=== Results ===
Results by county: Dayton: 30–40%; 40–50%; 50–60%; 60–70%; Kelliher: 30–40%; 40–50%; Entenza: 30–40%; 50–60%

Dayton narrowly won the August 10 primary, earning the right to serve as his party's nominee. He was formally endorsed by the DFL on August 21.

Democratic–Farmer–Labor primary results
Party	Candidate	Votes	%
Democratic (DFL)	Mark Dayton	182,738	41.3
Democratic (DFL)	Margaret Anderson Kelliher	175,767	39.8
Democratic (DFL)	Matt Entenza	80,509	18.2
Democratic (DFL)	Peter Idusogie	3,123	0.7
Total votes		442,137	100

== Independence primary ==
=== Candidates ===
- Rob Hahn
  - Thomas Harens
- Tom Horner, public affairs consultant
  - Jim Mulder
- Phil Ratté
  - Gayle-Lynn Lemaster
- John T. Uldrich
  - Stephen Williams
- Rahn V. Workcuff
  - Mark F. Workcuff

==== Withdrew ====
- Joe Repya, former lieutenant colonel in the U.S. Army

==== Declined ====
- Dean Barkley, former U.S. senator
- Peter Bell, Metropolitan Council chair
- David Olson, Minnesota Chamber of Commerce president
- Tim Penny, former U.S. representative

=== Convention results ===
On Sunday, May 9, 2010, Tom Horner won the endorsement of the Independence Party for governor. His main opponent, Rob Hahn, said he would contest the primary.

=== Results ===
Horner won the August 10 primary, defeating Hahn to earn a place on the November ballot.

Independence Party primary results
Party	Candidate	Votes	%
Independence	Tom Horner	11,380	64.2
Independence	Rob Hahn	2,538	14.3
Independence	John T. Uldrich	1,766	10.0
Independence	Phile Ratté	1,215	7.0
Independence	Rahn V. Workcuff	815	4.5
Total votes		17,714	100

== General election ==
=== Candidates ===
- Mark Dayton, former United States senator (DFL)
  - Running mate: Yvonne Prettner Solon, Minnesota state senator
- Tom Emmer, state representative from Delano (Republican)
  - Running mate: Annette Meeks, member of the Metropolitan Council
- Linda Eno (Resource)
  - Running mate: Howard Hanson
- Farheen Hakeem (Green)
  - Running mate: Dan Dittman
- Tom Horner, public affairs consultant (Independence)
  - Running mate: Jim Mulder
- Ken Pentel (Ecology Democracy)
  - Running mate: Erin Wallace
- Chris Wright (Grassroots)
  - Running mate: Edwin Engelmann

=== Predictions ===
Source	Ranking	As of
Cook Political Report	Tossup	October 14, 2010
Rothenberg	Tilt D (flip)	October 28, 2010
RealClearPolitics	Tossup	November 1, 2010
Sabato's Crystal Ball	Lean D (flip)	October 28, 2010
CQ Politics	Tossup	October 28, 2010

=== Polling ===
Early polls showed Emmer even with his likely DFL opponents, with Horner trailing far behind, and a large percentage of voters undecided. As the race progressed, polls showed the candidates even, or Dayton with a small but significant lead. The nonpartisan Cook Political Report, CQ Politics and pollster Rasmussen Reports rated the election a tossup, while New York Times political statistician Nate Silver gave Dayton an 86 percent chance of winning.

Graphical summary

View source data.

Poll source	Dates administered	Margion of Error	Tom Emmer (R)	Mark Dayton (DFL)	Tom Horner (I)	Undecided
Public Policy Polling	Oct. 27 – 29, 2010	±2.2%	40%	43%	15%	3%
SurveyUSA	Oct. 24 – 27, 2010	±4%	38%	39%	13%	9%
Minnesota Public Radio	Oct. 21 – 25, 2010	±3.6%	29%	41%	11%	20%
St. Cloud State University	Oct. 10 – 21, 2010	±5.0%	30%	40%	19%	10%
Minnesota Poll	Oct. 18 – 21, 2010	±3.9%	34%	41%	13%	12%
Rasmussen Reports	Oct. 20, 2010	±4.0%	41%	44%	10%	5%
Survey USA	Oct. 11 – 13, 2010	±3.7%	37%	42%	14%	7%
Rasmussen Reports	Oct. 6, 2010	±4%	38%	40%	15%	7%
Humphrey Institute/MPR	Sep. 22 – 26, 2010	±3.6%	27%	38%	16%	19%
Minnesota Poll	Sep. 20–23, 2010	±4.1%	30%	39%	18%	13%
Rasmussen Reports	Sep. 22, 2010	±4%	42%	41%	9%	2%
Survey USA	Sep. 12 – 14, 2010	±3.9%	36%	38%	18%	4%
Humphrey Institute/MPR	Aug. 31, 2010	±5.3%	34%	34%	13%	19%
Rasmussen Reports	Aug. 12, 2010	±4.0%	36%	45%	10%	10%
Survey USA	Aug. 2 – 4, 2010	±2.7%	32%	46%	9%	13%
Minnesota Poll	Jul. 26 – 29, 2010	±4.3%	30%	40%	13%	17%
Rasmussen Reports	Jul. 19, 2010	±4.5%	36%	40%	10%	14%
Survey USA	Jun. 14 – 16, 2010	±2.5%	35%	38%	12%	15%
Decision Resources, Ltd.	May 28 – Jun. 2, 2010	±3.5%	28%	40%	18%	14%
Rasmussen Reports	May 24, 2010	±4.5%	37%	35%	12%	16%
Humphrey Institute/MPR	May 13 – 16, 2010	±5.8%	31%	35%	9%	25%
Survey USA	May 3 – 5, 2010	±4.1%	42%	34%	9%	15%
Rasmussen Reports	Mar. 10, 2010	±3%	35%	38%	7%	20%

Hypothetical polling

With Entenza

Poll source	Dates administered	Tom Emmer (R)	Matt Entenza (DFL)	Tom Horner (I)	Undecided	Sampling error
Survey USA	August 2–4, 2010	33%	38%	12%	17%	2.7%
Minnesota Poll	July 26–29, 2010	31%	36%	15%	17%	4.3%
Rasmussen Reports	July 19, 2010	36%	37%	12%	15%	4.5%
Survey USA	June 14–16, 2010	37%	33%	12%	18%	2.5%
Decision Resources, Ltd.	May 28 – June 2, 2010	27%	34%	19%	20%	3.5%
Rasmussen Reports	May 24, 2010	37%	34%	12%	17%	4.5%
Humphrey Institute /MPR	May 13–16, 2010	32%	28%	11%	29%	5.8%
Survey USA	May 3–5, 2010	42%	31%	10%	16%	4.1%
Rasmussen Reports	March 10, 2010	37%	28%	8%	26%	3%

With Kelliher

Poll source	Dates administered	Tom Emmer (R)	Margaret Anderson Kelliher (DFL)	Tom Horner (I)	Undecided	Sampling error
Survey USA	August 2–4, 2010	33%	39%	12%	17%	2.7%
Minnesota Poll	July 26–29, 2010	29%	38%	13%	18%	4.3%
Rasmussen Reports	July 19, 2010	35%	40%	11%	14%	4.5%
Survey USA	June 14–16, 2010	35%	33%	12%	21%	2.5%
Decision Resources, Ltd.	May 28 – June 2, 2010	28%	38%	17%	17%	3.5%
Rasmussen Reports	May 24, 2010	38%	36%	11%	15%	4.5%
Humphrey Institute /MPR	May 13–16, 2010	32%	29%	10%	30%	5.8%
Survey USA	May 3–5, 2010	41%	33%	9%	17%	4.1%
Rasmussen Reports	March 10, 2010	37%	34%	8%	19%	3%

With Pawlenty

Source	Date	Tim Pawlenty	Mark Dayton
KSTP-TV/SurveyUSA	May 20, 2009	47%	43%

Source	Date	Tim Pawlenty	R. T. Rybak
KSTP-TV/SurveyUSA	May 20, 2009	47%	42%

Source	Date	Tim Pawlenty	Chris Coleman
KSTP-TV/SurveyUSA	May 20, 2009	48%	37%

Source	Date	Tim Pawlenty	Matt Entenza
KSTP-TV/SurveyUSA	May 20, 2009	51%	37%

Source	Date	Tim Pawlenty	Susan Gaertner
KSTP-TV/SurveyUSA	May 20, 2009	50%	36%

Source	Date	Tim Pawlenty	Tom Bakk
KSTP-TV/SurveyUSA	May 20, 2009	52%	34%

Source	Date	Tim Pawlenty	John Marty
KSTP-TV/SurveyUSA	May 20, 2009	51%	34%

Source	Date	Tim Pawlenty	Margaret Anderson Kelliher
KSTP-TV/SurveyUSA	May 20, 2009	51%	34%

Source	Date	Tim Pawlenty	Paul Thissen
KSTP-TV/SurveyUSA	May 20, 2009	51%	32%

With Emmer

Source	Date	Tom Emmer	Mark Dayton
Rasmussen Reports	March 10, 2010	35%	38%

Source	Date	Tom Emmer	Margaret Anderson Kelliher
Rasmussen Reports	March 10, 2010	37%	34%

Source	Date	Tom Emmer	R.T. Rybak
Rasmussen Reports	March 10, 2010	35%	38%

Source	Date	Tom Emmer	Tom Bakk
Rasmussen Reports	March 10, 2010	36%	29%

Source	Date	Tom Emmer	Tom Rukavina
Rasmussen Reports	March 10, 2010	38%	29%

Source	Date	Tom Emmer	Matt Entenza
Rasmussen Reports	March 10, 2010	37%	28%

With Seifert

Source	Date	Marty Seifert	Mark Dayton
Rasmussen Reports	March 10, 2010	39%	38%

Source	Date	Marty Seifert	Margaret Anderson Kelliher
Rasmussen Reports	March 10, 2010	39%	35%

Source	Date	Marty Seifert	R.T. Rybak
Rasmussen Reports	March 10, 2010	38%	38%

Source	Date	Marty Seifert	Tom Bakk
Rasmussen Reports	March 10, 2010	37%	30%

Source	Date	Marty Seifert	Tom Rukavina
Rasmussen Reports	March 10, 2010	39%	30%

Source	Date	Marty Seifert	Matt Entenza
Rasmussen Reports	March 10, 2010	38%	30%

With Coleman

Source	Date	Norm Coleman	R.T. Rybak
Public Policy Polling	June 7–8, 2009	37%	43%

Source	Date	Norm Coleman	Mark Dayton
Public Policy Polling	June 7–8, 2009	39%	41%

Source	Date	Norm Coleman	Margaret Anderson Kelliher
Public Policy Polling	June 7–8, 2009	42%	34%

=== Results ===
Dayton led Emmer at the close of balloting by 8,770 votes (0.42%). The margin of victory was small enough to trigger an automatic recount under state law, but analysts generally thought it unlikely that Dayton's lead would be overturned.

Dayton became just the fourth victorious Minnesota Democrat to win a gubernatorial election with a Democrat in the White House in 28 cycles.

County results for the Independence Party: Horner: <9%; 9-10%; 10-11%; 11-12%; 12-13%; 13-14%; 14-15%; 15-16%; 16%<

2010 gubernatorial election results, Minnesota
Party	Candidate	Votes	%	±%
Democratic (DFL)	Mark Dayton	919,232	43.63%	−2.07%
Republican	Tom Emmer	910,462	43.21%	−3.49%
Independence	Tom Horner	251,487	11.94%	+5.54%
Grassroots	Chris Wright	7,516	0.36%	n/a
Green	Farheen Hakeem	6,188	0.29%	−0.21%
Ecology Democracy	Ken Pentel	6,180	0.29%	n/a
Resource Party	Linda Eno	4,092	0.19%	n/a
Write-ins		1,864	0.09%	
Total votes		2,106,979	100	
Democratic (DFL) gain from Republican				

=== Recount results ===
The recount was carried out by the Minnesota Secretary of State, Mark Ritchie, as part of a State Canvassing Board, which consists of the secretary of state, two justices of the Minnesota Supreme Court, and two judges of a Minnesota district court. The vote totals were not changed, and Dayton was declared the governor-elect.

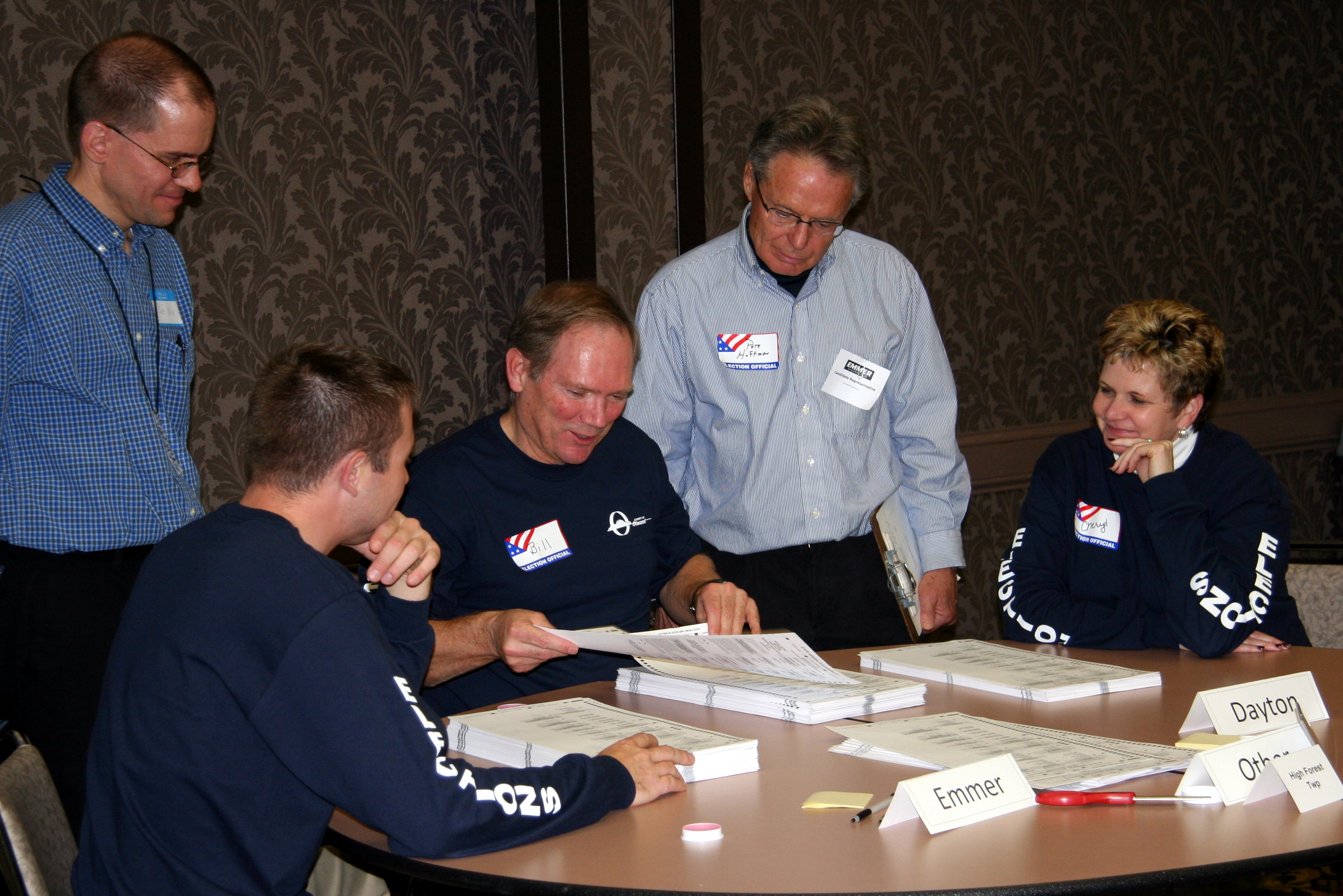
Olmsted County, Minnesota officials recounting votes on November 29, 2010

2010 gubernatorial election results, Minnesota
Party	Candidate	Votes	%	±%
Democratic (DFL)	Mark Dayton/Yvonne Prettner Solon	919,232	43.63%	−2.07%
Republican	Tom Emmer/Annette Meeks	910,462	43.21%	−3.49%
Independence	Tom Horner/Jim Mulder	251,487	11.94%	+5.54%
Grassroots	Chris Wright	7,516	0.36%	n/a
Green	Farheen Hakeem	6,188	0.29%	−0.21%
Ecology Democracy	Ken Pentel	6,180	0.29%	n/a
Resource Party	Linda Eno	4,092	0.19%	n/a
Write-ins		1,864	0.09%	
Total votes		2,106,979	100	
Democratic (DFL) gain from Republican				

==== Counties that flipped from Democratic to Republican ====
- Clearwater (largest city: Bagley)
- Grant (largest city: Elbow Lake)
- Pennington (largest city: Thief River Falls)
- Lincoln (largest city: Tyler)
- Pine (largest city: Pine City)
- Fillmore (largest city: Spring Valley)

==== Counties that flipped from Republican to Democratic ====
- Clay (largest city: Moorhead)
- Nicollet (largest city: North Mankato)
