= John Gunyou =

American politician

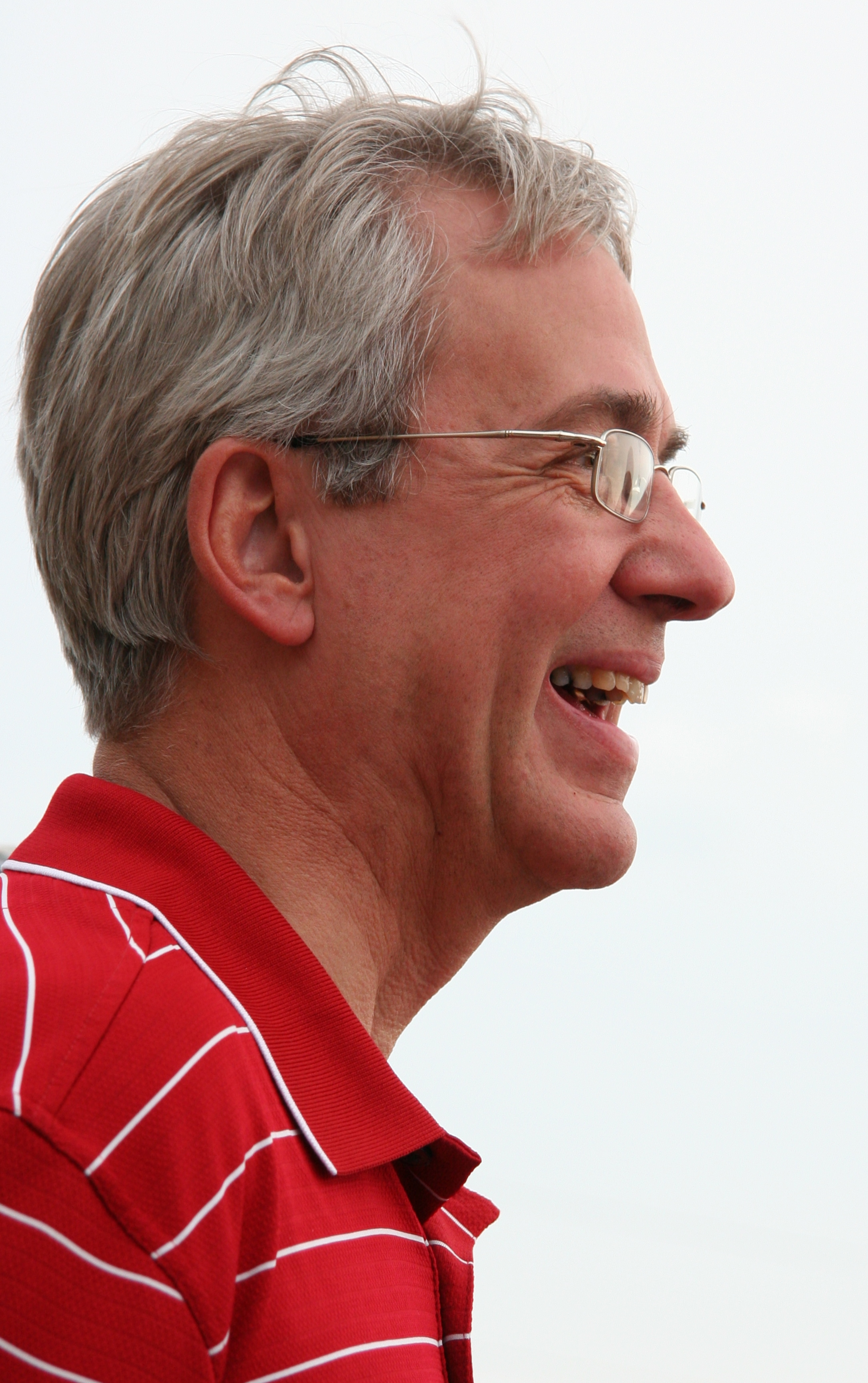

Minnesota Commissioner of Finance
- In office 1991–1994
- Governor: Arne Carlson

Personal details
- Born: August 21, 1948 (age 78)
- Party: DFL
- Spouse: Kim Gunyou
- Children: Five
- Education: U.S. Air Force Academy; UCLA; University of Colorado
- Occupation: Public Administrator; City Manager
- Website: http://margaretforgovernor.com

John Gunyou (born August 21, 1948) is a Minnesota politician who was the Minnesota Democratic-Farmer-Labor Party's endorsed candidate for lieutenant governor in the 2010 election. He was Minnesota finance commissioner and the city manager of Minnetonka. He currently chairs the board of the Three Rivers Park District.

== Education and Professional Background ==
Gunyou was finance director for Minneapolis from 1984 to 1991. In 1991 Governor Arne Carlson appointed him as state commissioner of finance, a position he held until 1994.

Gunyou received his B.S. degree in economics from the U.S. Air Force Academy. He later earned M.S. degrees in finance and public administration from UCLA and the University of Colorado. He has taught at the University of Minnesota's Humphrey Institute and served on the Minnesota Health Care Commission.

Gunyou serves on the board of Minneapolis's Jungle Theater and is a member of the technical advisory committee for Minnesota Compass. He lives in Minnetonka with his wife, Kim. They have five children.

== Lieutenant Governor Candidate ==
On May 21, 2010, Gunyou was selected to be the running mate of gubernatorial candidate Margaret Anderson Kelliher. The choice of Gunyou, who had served previously under Republican Governor Arne Carlson, was called a "calculated risk," as Kelliher was facing a primary challenge from Mark Dayton and Matt Entenza.
