= Susan Gaertner =

American lawyer

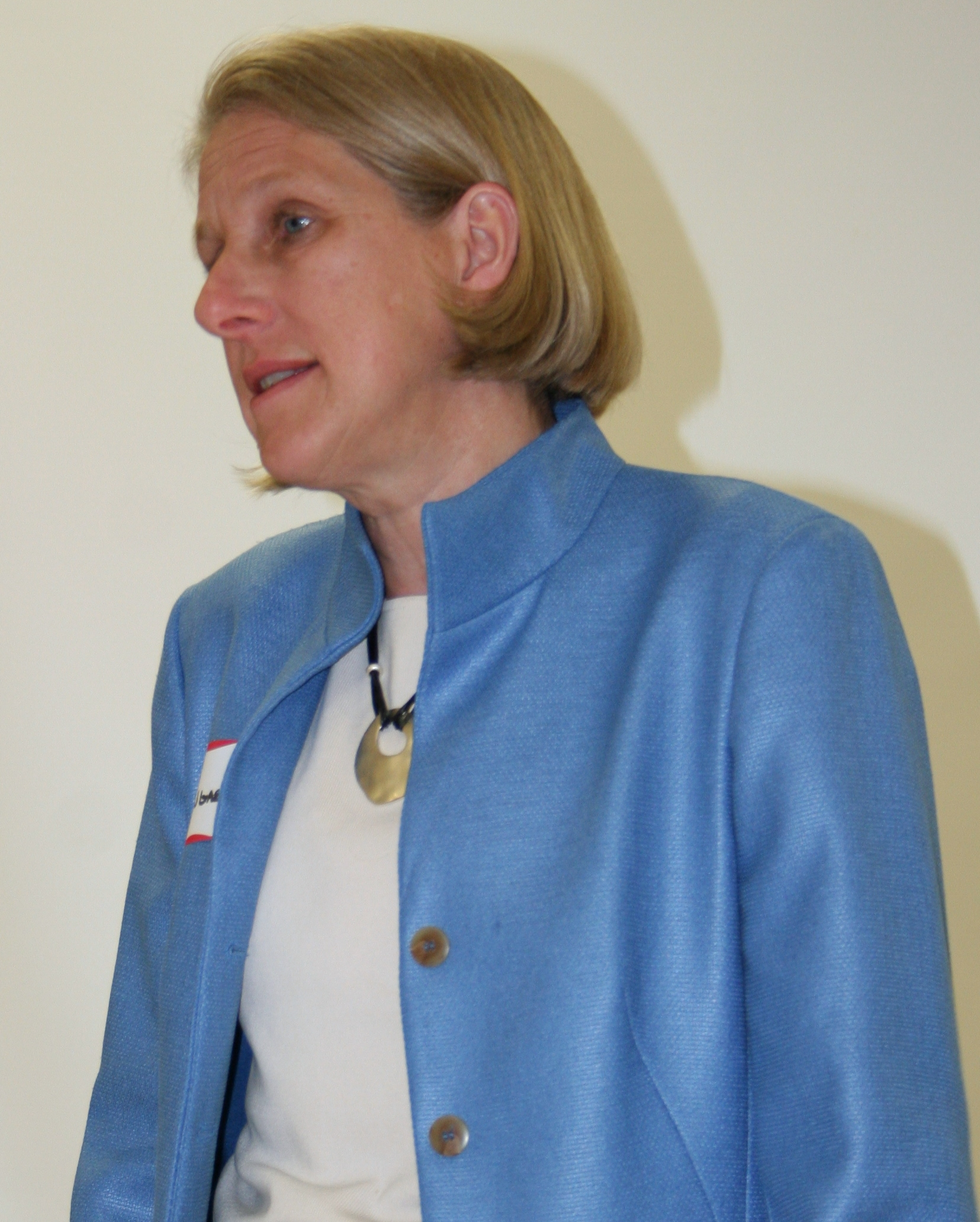

Ramsey County Attorney
- In office 1995–2011
- Preceded by: Tom Foley
- Succeeded by: John Choi
- Constituency: Ramsey County, Minnesota

Personal details
- Party: DFL
- Spouse: John Wodele
- Children: Emily, Alison, and Hannah
- Education: University of Minnesota Duluth, University of Minnesota Law School

Susan Gaertner is a Minnesota politician and the former county attorney for Ramsey County, Minnesota. She was a candidate for the Democratic-Farmer-Labor Party endorsement for governor in the 2010 election, and became a principal at Minneapolis-based law firm Gray Plant Mooty.

== Family and early life ==
Gaertner grew up on the Eastside of St. Paul during a period of opportunity for working-class families. Her mother and father took full advantage of this environment, with her mother attending college at a time it was uncommon for women to pursue higher education, and her father served as a social worker in Ramsey County. Gaertner has resided in White Bear Lake, Minnesota, with her husband, John Wodele, the former press secretary for Governor Jesse Ventura. She has three daughters.

== Education and professional career ==
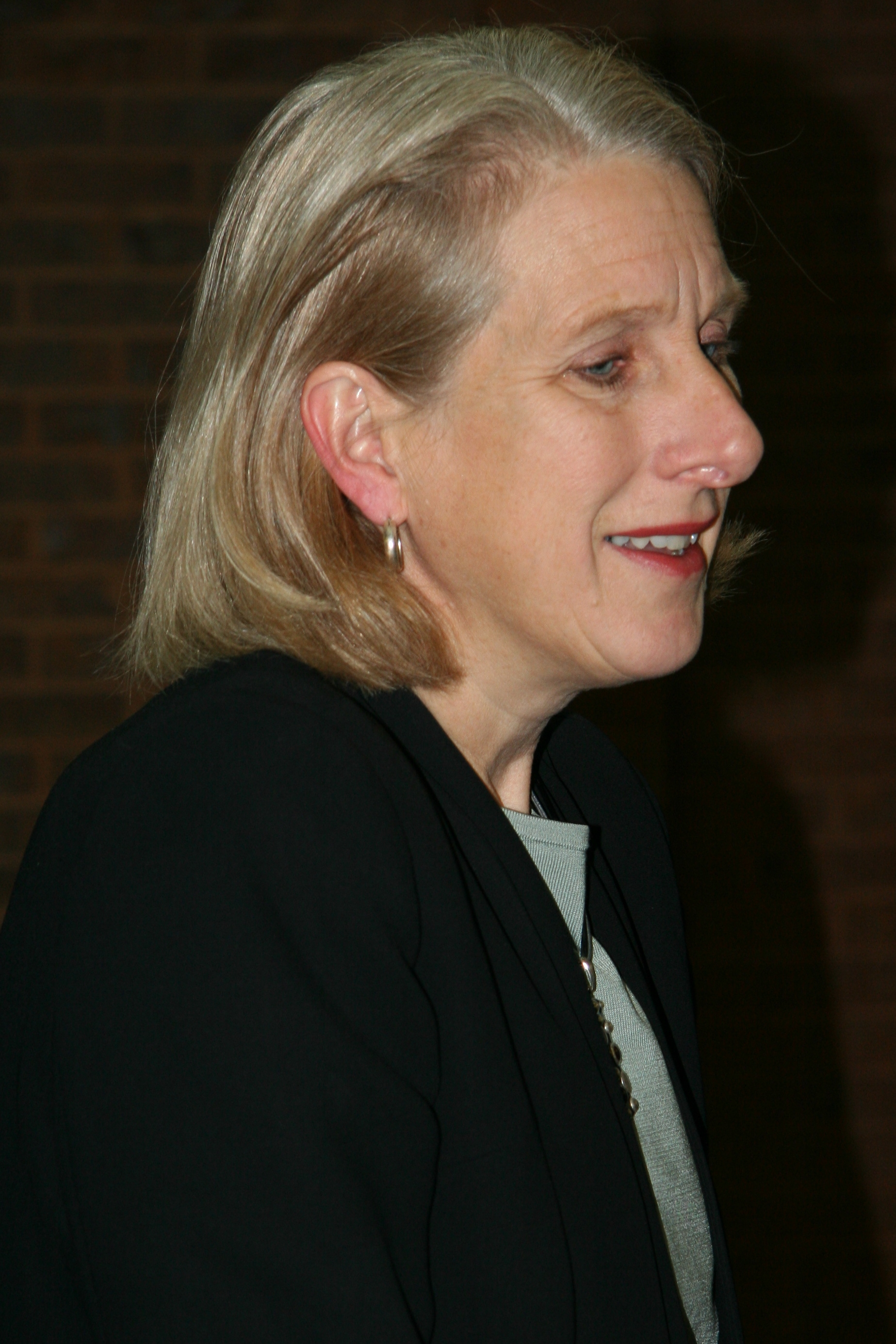
Gaertner in 2009.

Gaertner attended Harding High School in Saint Paul, Minnesota. She went on to graduate from the University of Minnesota Duluth and the University of Minnesota Law School. After graduation, Gaertner served as a clerk in the office of Federal Appeals Court Judge Gerald W. Heaney, and later worked as a criminal defense attorney for the William Mauzy Law Firm. Gaertner then joined the Ramsey County's attorney office in 1984.

In 1989, while working for the Ramsey County Attorney's office, she became the first Minnesota prosecutor to introduce DNA evidence in court. Later, as Ramsey County Attorney, Gaertner established programs designed to curb domestic violence.

== Awards and honors ==
In 2002 Gaertner was inducted into the Harding High School Hall of Fame in recognition of her successful Truancy Intervention Program. In 2004, the Minnesota County Attorneys Association awarded her the group's highest honor—an honor presented annually to a county attorney who exhibits extraordinary leadership in the field of justice. Gaertner was inducted into the American College of Trial Lawyers in 2009.

== 2010 gubernatorial run ==
In 2009, Gaertner announced her candidacy for governor as a Democrat, citing her experience as a prosecutor in Ramsey County. Gaertner initially indicated she would not seek party endorsement, but would instead run in the DFL primary in August 2010. Gaertner later withdrew from the race.
