= Minnesota 2020 =

American think tank

- Founded: June 2007
- Founder: Matt Entenza
- Purpose: Economic development, education, health care, and transportation
- Revenue: $364,182 (2014)
- Expenses: $413,331 (2014)
- Website: mn2020.org @MN2020

Minnesota 2020 is a non-partisan think tank created by ex-Minnesota Democratic–Farmer–Labor Party State Representative Matt Entenza in June 2007 in Minnesota, USA. Minnesota 2020 focuses on the issues of economic development, education, health care, transportation and other key issues. Minnesota 2020 ceased operations in 2014.
