= Lois Quam =

American healthcare executive (born 1961)

- Born: Lois Elaine Quam; 1961 (age 64–65)
- Education: Macalester College (BA); Trinity College, Oxford (MA)
- Occupation: Healthcare executive
- Political party: Democratic
- Spouses: Matt Entenza (m. 1984, divorced); Arshad Mohammed (m. 2014)
- Children: 3

Lois Elaine Quam (born 1961) is an American healthcare executive who was President and CEO of Blue Shield of California between January 2025 and March 2025. She was also CEO of Pathfinder International from 2017 to 2024 and was an executive at UnitedHealth Group from 1989 to 2007.

== Early life and education ==
Quam was raised in Marshall, Minnesota by Louise Quam and John Quam, a Lutheran pastor. She is of Norwegian descent. She graduated from Marshall High School in 1979. She graduated from Macalester College with a bachelor's degree in political science in 1983. She was awarded a Rhodes Scholarship to Trinity College, Oxford, where she received a second bachelor's degree in Philosophy, politics, and economics, promoted to a Masters of Arts (MA Oxon) per tradition.

== Career ==
Quam began working at UnitedHealth Group in 1989. She became founding CEO of the company's Ovations division, the predecessor to UnitedHealthcare Medicare & Retirement, in 1998. Working at the company during a period of rapid growth, Quam secured a partnership between Ovations and the AARP.

Also in 1989, Quam became chair of the Minnesota Health Care Access Commission. The commission's recommendations resulted in legislation that created MinnesotaCare. As a result of her work in Minnesota, she served as a senior advisor to the Task Force on National Health Care Reform from 1993 to 1994 under then-first lady Hillary Clinton.

Quam left UnitedHealth in 2007 to work in Piper Jaffray's clean energy initiative, leaving the company in 2009 in order to found Tysvar LLC, a business incubator focused on renewable energy in Minnesota. She stepped down from the company in 2010 to assist her husband, Matt Entenza's, unsuccessful gubernatorial campaign. From 2011 to 2012, she was the Executive Director of the U.S. Global Health Initiative, founded by Barack Obama in 2009 to fund PEPFAR and other "health diplomacy" initiatives. She continued to work as a special advisor in the U.S. Department of State until 2014.

She was CEO of The Nature Conservancy from 2014 to 2016, and was CEO of Pathfinder International from 2017 to 2024. She became President of Blue Shield of California in August 2024, and became CEO of the company in January 2025 following corporate restructuring.

Quam has published articles in the field of global health, rural health, and health policy.

== Personal life and politics ==
Quam married Minnesota state legislator Matt Entenza in 1984; they met as students at Macalester College. She had three sons with Entenza: Ben and twins Will and Steve. They divorced, and she married Reuters foreign policy correspondent Arshad Mohammed in a Muslim ceremony in Washington, D.C. in 2014. The ceremony was followed by a service at St. Paul's Lutheran Church.

Quam has been active in the Minnesota Democratic–Farmer–Labor Party since her participation in the 1982 Minnesota Democratic convention as an alternate delegate from Lyon County. She was an elected delegate from the Fourth Congressional District in Minnesota to the 2008 Democratic Convention in Denver. She is a proponent of a public health insurance option. She is a member of the Council on Foreign Relations.

== Corporate membership and honors ==
=== Boards ===
- Commonwealth Fund, member of the board of directors
- Presiding Bishop's Advisory Council of the Evangelical Lutheran Church in America, member of the advisory council
- Humphrey School of Public Affairs at the University of Minnesota, member of the advisory council

=== Honors ===
Quam was named Norwegian American of the year in 2005. She has been named to Fortune's list of the most influential women leaders in business three times. Quam gave the commencement speech at Macalester College in 2011, where she also was awarded the distinguished alumni award. She was awarded an honorary Doctorate of Humane Letters from Augsburg College in 2014.
