= Freedom Foundation of Minnesota =

American think tank

- Founder: Annette Meeks
- Established: 2006
- CEO: Annette Meeks
- Budget: $263,000 (2023)
- Subsidiaries: Minnesota Watchdog
- Address: 520 Nicollet Mall, S-510; Minneapolis, MN 55402
- Coordinates: 44.9786°N 93.2708°W
- Interactive map of Freedom Foundation of Minnesota
- Website: freedomfoundationofminnesota.com

The Freedom Foundation of Minnesota (FFM) is a conservative think tank based in Minnesota. The group states that it "actively advocates the principles of individual freedom, personal responsibility, economic freedom, and limited government." Annette Meeks founded the organization in 2006 and is CEO. The Freedom Foundation of Minnesota founded Minnesota Watchdog, an online news service. The organization is a member of the State Policy Network.
