= Center of the American Experiment =

American think tank

- Founder: Mitch Pearlstein
- Established: 1990
- President: John Hinderaker
- Chair: Ron Eibensteiner
- Budget: Revenue: $4.31 million (2024); Expenses: $4.15 million (2024)
- Address: 12600 Whitewater Drive Suite 150; Minnetonka, MN 55343
- Website: americanexperiment.org

The Center of the American Experiment is a Minnesota-based think tank that advocates for conservative and free-market principles. John Hinderaker, of the Power Line blog, is its president.

== Overview ==
The Center of the American Experiment was founded in 1990 by Mitch Pearlstein, a former Reagan appointee. Annette Meeks previously served as the organization's CEO. It has received grants from the Bradley Foundation and the John M. Olin Foundation. Katherine Kersten is a senior fellow at the organization.

The center has supported school vouchers and opposed affirmative action, particularly in academia. The organization has been credited with playing a major role in empowering conservatives in Minnesota.

Its offices were set on fire in February 2024 in a case of arson.
