= Yvonne Prettner Solon =

American politician (born 1946)

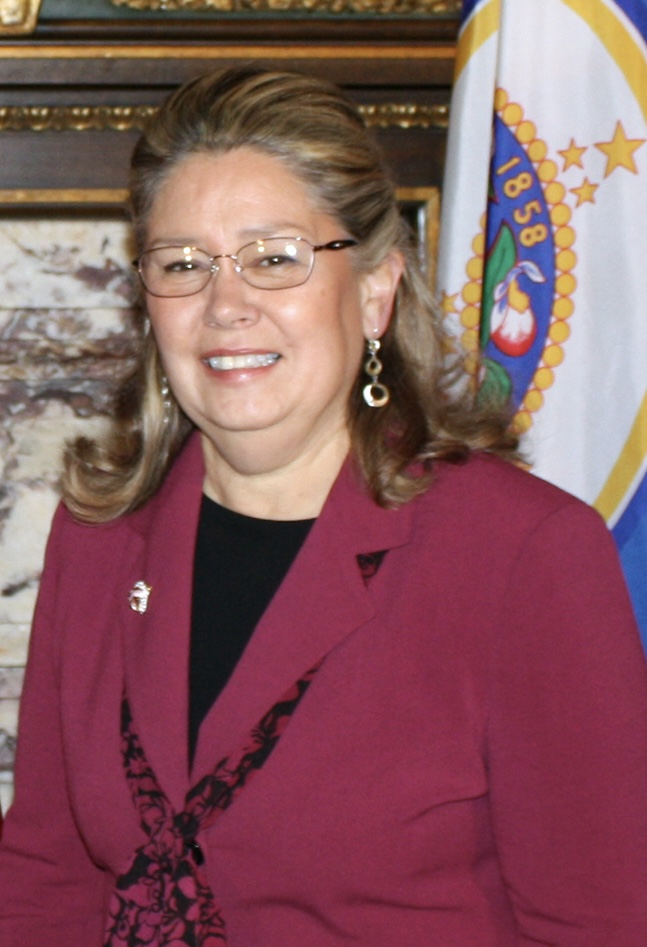
- Prettner Solon in 2012

47th Lieutenant Governor of Minnesota
- In office January 3, 2011 – January 5, 2015
- Governor: Mark Dayton
- Preceded by: Carol Molnau
- Succeeded by: Tina Smith

Member of the Minnesota Senate from the 7th district
- In office February 4, 2002 – January 3, 2011
- Preceded by: Sam Solon
- Succeeded by: Roger Reinert

Personal details
- Born: February 3, 1946 (age 80) Minneapolis, Minnesota, U.S.
- Party: Democratic
- Spouse: Sam Solon (deceased)
- Children: 2
- Education: University of Minnesota Duluth (BSD, MA)
- Occupation: psychologist, legislator

Yvonne Prettner Solon (born February 3, 1946) is an American politician who served from 2011 to 2015 as the 47th lieutenant governor of Minnesota. She is the sixth consecutive woman to serve in that capacity and is a member of the Democratic-Farmer-Labor Party. She served with Governor Mark Dayton during his first term in office, after which she retired.

== Education ==
Prettner Solon completed her secondary education at Stanbrook Hall Preparatory School, a Roman Catholic school for girls in Duluth, Minnesota. She received a B.S.D. and a M.A. from the University of Minnesota Duluth.

== State Senate ==
Prettner Solon was a member of the Minnesota Senate representing District 7, which includes portions of St. Louis County in the northeastern part of the state. She was first elected in a January 2002 special election held after the death of her husband, Senator Sam Solon, on December 28, 2001. She was reelected in 2002 and 2006. Her special legislative concerns included economic development, education, health care, the environment, transportation, and jobs.

=== Committees ===
Prettner Solon was a member of the Senate's Capital Investment Committee, the Commerce and Consumer Protection Committee, the Energy, Utilities, Technology and Communications Committee (which she chaired), and the Health, Housing and Family Security Committee. She also served on the Finance Subcommittee for the Health and Human Services Budget Division.

== Lieutenant governor ==
On May 24, 2010, gubernatorial candidate and former U.S. Senator Mark Dayton announced that Prettner Solon would be his lieutenant governor running mate in the 2010 election. Dayton said "her thoughtful, sensitive and visionary leadership and public service are further informed by her life experiences, which have forged a woman I deeply respect and admire." Her selection was seen as bringing regional and gender balance to the Dayton campaign.

On August 10, 2010, the Dayton-Prettner Solon ticket narrowly defeated Margaret Anderson Kelliher for the DFL nomination. In a close general election that included a recount, Dayton and Prettner Solon defeated Republican nominees Tom Emmer and Annette Meeks. In 2014, Prettner Solon received the Joan and Walter Mondale Award for Public Service at the Humphrey-Mondale Awards.

== Electoral history ==
Minnesota Senate Election District 7, 2002
Party	Candidate	Votes	%
Democratic (DFL)	Yvonne Prettner Solon (incumbent)	19,314	73%
Republican	Justin Krych	7,128	27%

Minnesota Senate Election District 7, 2006
Party	Candidate	Votes	%
Democratic (DFL)	Yvonne Prettner Solon (incumbent)	21,861	74.9%
Republican	Steve Khalar	7,243	24.8%

== See also ==
- List of female lieutenant governors in the United States

Party political offices
Preceded by Judi Dutcher	Democratic nominee for Lieutenant Governor of Minnesota; 2010	Succeeded by Tina Smith
Political offices
Preceded by Carol Molnau	Lieutenant Governor of Minnesota; 2011–2015	Succeeded by Tina Smith
Preceded by Sam Solon	Member of the Minnesota Senate from the 7th district 2002–2011	Succeeded by Roger Reinert
