= John Choi (attorney) =

American lawyer

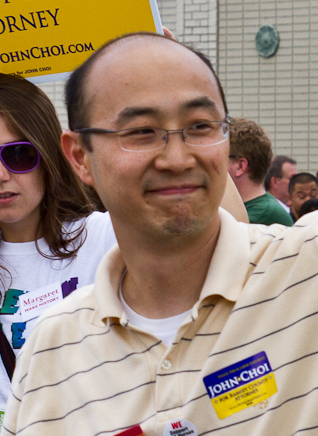
- Choi in 2010

Ramsey County Attorney
- Incumbent
- Assumed office January 2011
- Preceded by: Susan Gaertner

Saint Paul City Attorney
- In office January 2006 – April 5, 2010
- Appointed by: Chris Coleman
- Preceded by: Manuel Cervantes
- Succeeded by: Sara Grewing

Personal details
- Born: Seoul, South Korea
- Party: DFL
- Education: Hamline University Law School; Humphrey School of Public Affairs; Marquette University
- Profession: Lawyer

John Choi is an American attorney and politician who has served as the county attorney of Ramsey County, Minnesota since 2011. He served as Saint Paul City Attorney from 2006 to 2010. Choi is a first-generation Korean-American immigrant and the first Korean American to serve as an elected county or district attorney in the United States. He has gained attention for his office's prosecutions of human trafficking and for his successful leadership of criminal justice reform efforts.

== Early life and career ==
Choi was born in Seoul and immigrated to the United States with his parents in 1973. The family resided for a time in Saint Paul's Skyline Tower, the largest subsidized housing complex in the United States west of Chicago. Choi is a graduate of St. Thomas Academy and Marquette University. In 1995, he received a juris doctor from Hamline University Law School (now known as Mitchell Hamline School of Law) and was a Humphrey Fellow at the University of Minnesota Humphrey School of Public Affairs. Prior to graduating from law school, Choi was a legislative aide to Saint Paul City Council member Bob Long and was active in Twin Cities politics.

Between 1995 and 2006, Choi practiced commercial litigation, government relations law, and municipal law with the Twin Cities firms Hessian, McKasy, & Soderberg and Kennedy & Graven, where he became a partner at age thirty. In 2006, he was appointed by Mayor Chris Coleman as Saint Paul City Attorney. As city attorney, Choi served as the city's chief legal counsel and supervised misdemeanor prosecutions.

== Tenure as county attorney ==
In 2010, Choi stepped down as city attorney to run for Ramsey County Attorney, an office vacated by the retiring Susan Gaertner. He received the Democratic-Farmer-Labor Party's endorsement and won the August 2010 primary election over attorney David T. Schultz and Roseville City Council member Tammy Pust, ultimately prevailing over Schultz in the November general election. Choi was reelected without opposition in 2014; reelected in 2018 over Luke Kyper Bellville with 78.4% of the vote; and reelected without opposition in 2022.

As county attorney, Choi is in charge of all adult felony prosecutions in Ramsey County as well as all juvenile matters. He also serves as the county's chief legal counsel, provides civil legal services to the county's child protection and civil commitment functions, and leads the county's child support services. He has embraced criminal justice reform initiatives, establishing a veterans' treatment court, engaging in community prosecution efforts, and working to reduce racial disparities. Along with other reform-minded prosecutors, he has participated in the Institute for Innovation in Prosecution. Choi has also aggressively prosecuted human trafficking and other cases of violence against women, earning recognition from other county attorneys in Minnesota for these efforts.

== Policy initiatives and reform efforts ==
=== Youth justice reform ===
In 2019, Choi launched the (Re)Imagining Justice for Youth initiative to promote community-based responses to youth offenses. The program emphasizes restorative approaches and seeks to address disparities affecting Black, Latino, and Indigenous youth.

=== Sexual assault response and prevention ===
Choi has supported efforts to improve institutional responses to sexual assault, including training for law enforcement and prosecutors and promoting victim-centered practices. He has partnered with community organizations through campaigns such as Start by Believing and led a recommitment effort in 2025 to improve services for underserved communities.

=== Non-Public Safety Traffic Stop Policy ===
In September, 2021, Choi announced a change in prosecutorial policy in conjunction and collaboration with the three largest police agencies in his jurisdiction regarding non-public-safety traffic stops, shifting resources to prioritize stops involving public safety risks. The collaborative initiative aimed to reduce racial disparities, improve community trust, and provide financial support for vehicle owners needing assistance to correct equipment violations.

=== Sex trafficking prevention ===
Choi has been active in anti-sex trafficking initiatives, including a statewide effort among prosecutors to avoid charging minors for prostitution and to instead treat them as victims. He has supported public education campaigns and partnered with nonprofit organizations to improve prevention and enforcement.

== Notable cases ==
In 2015, he announced the indictment of the Roman Catholic Archdiocese of Saint Paul and Minneapolis for crimes related to the coverup of sexual abuse cases.

In November 2016, Choi's office prosecuted St. Anthony police officer Jeronimo Yanez for manslaughter after the death of Philando Castile in Falcon Heights, Minnesota. He was the first Minnesota County Attorney to charge a police officer for shooting and killing a civilian in the line of duty. Yanez was found not guilty, but his trial paved the way for future charges for officer involved shootings.
