= Sam Solon =

American politician

Member of the Minnesota Senate from the 7th district
- In office January 2, 1973 – December 28, 2001
- Preceded by: Clarence Mark Purfeest
- Succeeded by: Yvonne Prettner Solon

Member of the Minnesota House of Representatives from the 60th District
- In office January 5, 1971 – January 1, 1973
- Preceded by: Earl B. Gustafson
- Succeeded by: District Abolished

Personal details
- Born: Sam George Solon; June 25, 1931 Duluth, Minnesota, U.S.
- Died: December 28, 2001 (aged 70) Duluth, Minnesota, U.S.
- Party: Minnesota Democratic-Farmer-Labor Party
- Spouse(s): Carole (until 1975); Paula (until 1988); Yvonne Prettner
- Children: 6
- Education: University of Minnesota Duluth
- Profession: Educator, coach, legislator, veteran

Sam George Solon (June 25, 1931 – December 28, 2001) was a Minnesota politician, and a member of the Minnesota Senate and the Minnesota House of Representatives. A Democrat, he served in the legislature for over 30 years, 28 of those years in the senate. He died of melanoma in 2001.

== Early years and education ==
Solon was born in Duluth in 1931, the son of Greek immigrants. He graduated from Duluth Central High School in 1949 and served in the U.S. Army from 1952 to 1954. He earned his B.S. in Education in 1958 from the University of Minnesota in Duluth. After graduation, he worked as a junior high school social studies teacher and coach. He also served as chair of Duluth's alcoholic beverage board from 1967 to 1970.

== Legislative career ==
In 1970, Solon ran for and won a seat in the Minnesota House of Representatives, representing the old District 60 prior to legislative redistricting. He served one term, then ran for and won a seat in the Minnesota Senate in 1972, representing the new District 7. From then on, he faced scant opposition, defeating most opponents by better than 70 percent.

While in the senate, Solon chaired the Health, Welfare, and Corrections committee from 1981 to 1982, then chaired the Commerce Committee in its various incarnations from 1983 until his death. He was also chair of the Education Subcommittee for Assessment and Accountability from 1975 to 1976, and of the Commerce Subcommittee for Banking from 1977 to 1980. He was an appointed member of the Minnesota Iron Range Resources and Rehabilitation Board from 1979 to 2001.

== Legislative accomplishments ==
Through the years, Solon's special legislative concerns included health and welfare, education, economic development, higher education, seniors, drugs and crime, health insurance, and employment. Among his accomplishments, he worked to improve the Lake Superior Zoo and expand Duluth's convention center. He helped attract the Northwest Airlines maintenance base and the construction of a new aquarium. He was also the primary sponsor legislation mandating the extension of Interstate 35 through downtown Duluth. In August 2001, the University of Minnesota in Duluth honored his contributions to the school by naming a campus center after him.

== Family life ==
Solon was married three times, and had six children. He died of complications arising from melanoma on December 28, 2001. His last wife, Yvonne Prettner Solon, succeeded him in the Minnesota Senate.

Political offices
Preceded by Earl B. Gustafson (Old Senate District 60)	Member of the Minnesota Senate from the 7th District; 1973 – 2001	Succeeded by Yvonne Prettner Solon
Preceded by Earl B. Gustafson	Member of the Minnesota House of Representatives from the 60th District; 1971 – 1973	Succeeded by District Abolished
