= Robyne Robinson =

American journalist and entrepreneur

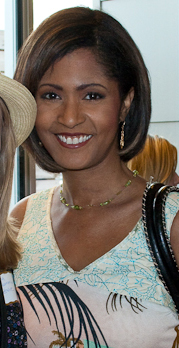
- Born: 1961 (age 64–65); Chicago, Illinois, U.S.
- Occupation: Television journalist
- Years active: 1979–2010
- Notable credit(s): Fox 9 News; WFAA-TV News; WMAR-TV News

Robyne Robinson (born 1961 in Chicago, Illinois) is an American television journalist and entrepreneur. She ran as a candidate for Lieutenant Governor of Minnesota in 2010.

== Biography ==
Robyne L. Robinson was born in Chicago as the younger of two daughters born to schoolteachers. She attended local area schools, graduating from Morgan Park Academy in 1979.

Robyne began her professional career tracking news for WNDU-TV in South Bend, Indiana. Later, she served as Military Affairs reporter for WVEC-TV in the Hampton-Norfolk area of Virginia. The Texas Association of Broadcasters honored her while working at WFAA-TV in Dallas. At WFAA-TV she covered local politics, education and public affairs. While serving as the weekend anchor at WMAR-TV in Baltimore, she was awarded the Gannett-Paul Miller Fellowship for reporting Washington politics.

For 20 years she was a reporter and then news anchor/co-anchor for Fox affiliate KMSP in Minneapolis-St. Paul, Minn. and worked at KMSP-TV since 1990, when KMSP was independent Minnesota 9.

On May 11, 2010, Robinson announced that she would leave KMSP and broadcasting. Her last day was May 26, 2010. On May 27, 2010, it was announced that Robinson would serve as the running mate of Matt Entenza, a DFL candidate in the August 2010 Minnesota gubernatorial primary. She had not previously been a candidate for elective office.

== Awards and recognition ==
- Hubert H. Humphrey Public Policy Fellow at the University of Minnesota
- 2005 Upper Midwest Emmy for Best Anchor
- Edward R. Murrow Award
- St. Paul Companies' Pan-African Council Legacy Award
- Media Allies Award, Minnesota Council of Non-Profits
- Minneapolis NAACP Television Industry Award

== Lieutenant Governor Run ==
On May 24, 2010, Robinson said in an interview that she had been asked to serve as the running mate of Democratic-Farmer-Labor Party gubernatorial candidate Matt Entenza. Robinson said she had not made up her mind yet, but that she was seriously considering it, as "any time you are potentially called to public service you need to think heavily about it." On May 27, 2010, the Entenza campaign announced that Robinson had accepted the offer. Robinson and Fox 9 were criticized for allowing Robinson to remain on air despite the offer, and also for not mentioning the offer during their newscast.

Robinson is the second Fox 9 News anchor to seek statewide office. Former U.S. Senator Rod Grams worked as an anchor for the station before entering politics. The campaign ended on August 10, with Matt Entenza conceding as results started to come in.
