= Matt Entenza =

American politician

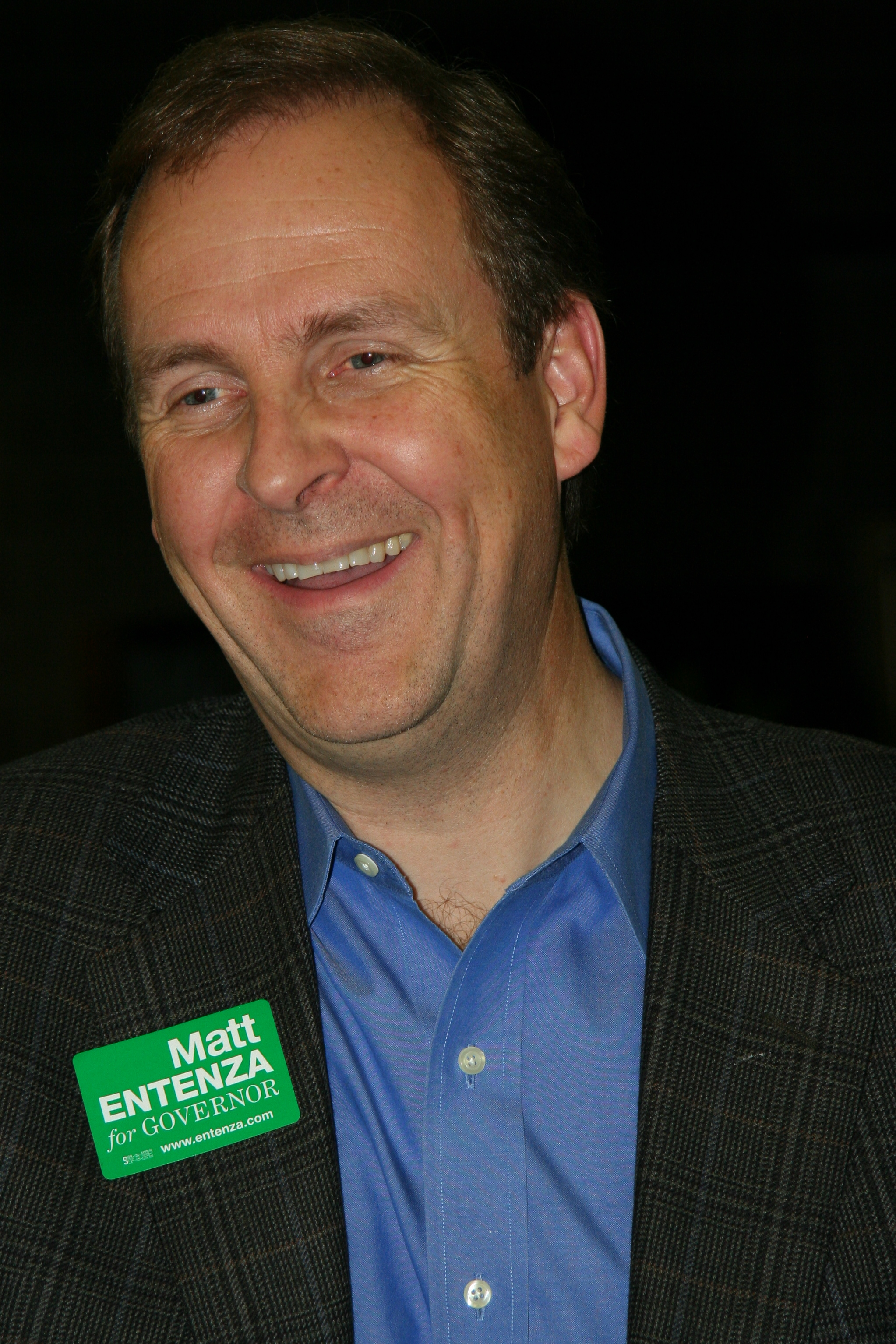

Minnesota House Minority Leader
- In office January 7, 2003 – June 20, 2006
- Preceded by: Tom Pugh
- Succeeded by: Margaret Anderson Kelliher

Member of the Minnesota House of Representatives from the 64A district
- In office January 3, 1995 – June 20, 2006
- Preceded by: Kathleen Vellenga
- Succeeded by: Erin Murphy

Personal details
- Born: October 4, 1961 (age 64) Santa Monica, California
- Party: Democratic-Farmer-Labor Party
- Spouse: Lois Quam (divorced)
- Children: Ben, Will, and Steve
- Education: Macalester College; Oxford University; University of Minnesota
- Occupation: Attorney

Matthew Keating Entenza (born October 4, 1961) is a Minnesota lawyer and former politician who served six terms in the Minnesota House of Representatives. He served as House Minority Leader from 2003 to 2006. After leaving the legislature, he was an unsuccessful candidate for various statewide offices, including governor, attorney general, and most recently state auditor.

== Background ==
Entenza was born in Santa Monica, California. He studied at Augustana College in South Dakota before transferring to Macalester College. After graduating, Entenza studied law at Oxford University and taught high school. After returning to Minnesota, he received his J.D. with honors from the University of Minnesota Law School.

== Service in the Minnesota House of Representatives ==
A Democrat, Entenza was elected to the Minnesota House of Representatives from District 64A in 1994. The district includes portions of the city of Saint Paul in Ramsey County. He served on the K-12 Finance, Education Policy, and Commerce committees.

== 2006 Minnesota Attorney General race ==
In 2006, Entenza resigned as House Minority Leader to focus on a campaign for Minnesota Attorney General. He withdrew from that race on July 18, 2006. Critics had raised concerns of a conflict of interest due to Entenza's wife's high ranking executive position at UnitedHealth Group. Entenza's political campaign committee was also fined $28,000 by the Minnesota Campaign Finance and Disclosure Board on August 15, 2006, for exceeding the legal amount for contributions.

== 2010 gubernatorial campaign ==
Entenza sought the office of governor in 2010. He first announced that he would seek the Minnesota DFL's endorsement for the 2010 Minnesota gubernatorial race, later dropping out of the endorsement process and running a primary campaign without the DFL endorsement. Before removing himself from the official endorsement process, he was endorsed by Minnesota Congressman Keith Ellison in May 2009 and Minnesota Stonewall DFL in December 2009. On May 27, 2010, he announced television broadcaster Robyne Robinson as his lieutenant governor running mate.

Entenza was not endorsed by the state party, and elected to participate in the primary election, in which he finished third, after Mark Dayton and Margaret Anderson Kelliher.

== 2014 Minnesota State Auditor race ==
In the 2014 election, Entenza ran for Minnesota State Auditor against the DFL-endorsed incumbent, Rebecca Otto. He bypassed public financing, which allowed him to exceed state spending limits. Despite spending more than $675,000 of his personal money on the race, Entenza received only 19% of the votes cast in the primary contest on August 12.

== Personal life ==
Entenza has three adult sons and is divorced from their mother, Lois Quam. He has since remarried, to Minnesota-native Jean Fox Entenza. Entenza is a Lutheran.

== See also ==
- Minnesota 2020

Political offices
Preceded by Tom Pugh	Minnesota House Minority Leader; 2003 – 2006	Succeeded by Margaret Anderson Kelliher
Minnesota House of Representatives
Preceded by Kathleen Vellenga	State Representative from Minnesota District 64A; 1995 – 2006	Succeeded by Erin Murphy
