= Annette Meeks =

American politician (born 1960)

Minnesota Metropolitan Council Member for the 7th District
- In office 2003–
- Governor: Tim Pawlenty
- Succeeded by: Yassin Osman

Personal details
- Born: April 12, 1960 (age 66)
- Party: Republican
- Spouse: John E. "Jack" Meeks
- Education: American Campaign Academy; University of Minnesota

Annette Meeks (born April 12, 1960) is a Minnesota Republican politician and a member of the state's Metropolitan Council. She was the 2010 endorsed Republican candidate for lieutenant governor, running with gubernatorial candidate Tom Emmer.

== Biography ==
Meeks pursued a degree at the University of Minnesota in Minneapolis, and also graduated from the American Campaign Academy in Washington, D.C. She was deputy chief of staff for House Speaker Newt Gingrich during his time in office. She later was chief executive officer of the Center of the American Experiment, a conservative think tank, and as the vice chair of the Republican Party of Minnesota. She is the founder and CEO of the Freedom Foundation of Minnesota.

Meeks was appointed to Minnesota's Metropolitan Council in 2003 by Governor Tim Pawlenty. She was reappointed to a second four-year term in 2007. She was vice chair of the Council's Community Development and Transportation Committees. She is no longer a member of the Met Council.

On April 28, 2010, state representative and gubernatorial candidate Tom Emmer named Meeks as his running mate. It was noted that she had previously argued that the position of lieutenant governor should be abolished.

Party political offices
Preceded by Carol Molnau	Republican nominee for Lieutenant Governor of Minnesota; 2010	Succeeded by Bill Kuisle
