= 2024 United States Senate election in Minnesota =

- November 5, 2024
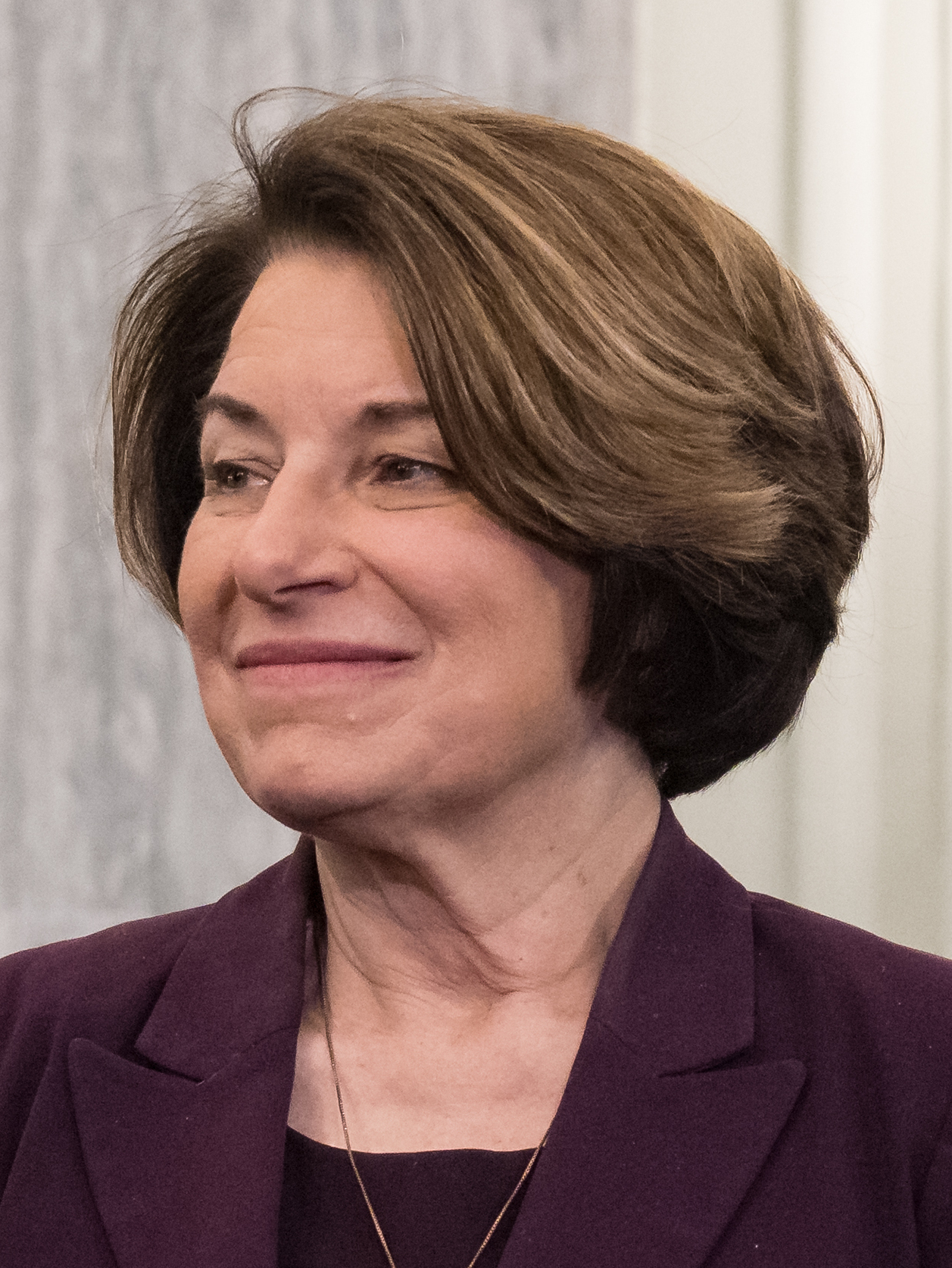

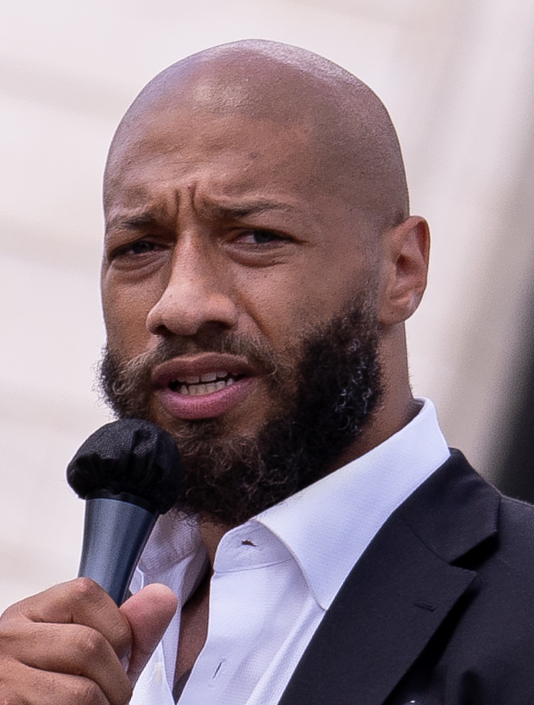
Nominee	Amy Klobuchar	Royce White
Party	Democratic (DFL)	Republican
Popular vote	1,792,441	1,291,712
Percentage	56.20%	40.50%
- Klobuchar: 40–50% 50–60% 60–70% 70–80% 80–90% >90% White: 40–50% 50–60% 60–70% 70–80% 80–90% >90% Tie: 40–50% No data
U.S. senator before election
Amy Klobuchar
Democratic (DFL)
Elected U.S. Senator
Amy Klobuchar
Democratic (DFL)

The 2024 United States Senate election in Minnesota was held on November 5, 2024, to elect a member of the United States Senate to represent the state of Minnesota. Democratic incumbent Amy Klobuchar won a fourth term in office, defeating Republican former basketball player Royce White by a 15.7% margin. Primary elections took place on August 13, 2024. Despite Klobuchar’s comfortable margin of victory, the race marked the weakest performance of her Senate career.

== Background ==
Minnesota is considered to be a slightly to moderately blue state at the federal level. In the 2020 presidential election, Joe Biden carried Minnesota by about seven percentage points. Democrats control both U.S. Senate seats, all statewide executive offices, and both state legislative chambers.

Klobuchar was first elected in 2006, defeating former U.S. Representative Mark Kennedy. She won re-election in 2012 and 2018 by large margins.

This race was considered to be clearly favoring Klobuchar, as she had won all three of her previous Senate elections by more than 20 points and typically over-performs other down-ballot candidates.

== Democratic–Farmer–Labor primary ==
=== Candidates ===
==== Nominee ====
- Amy Klobuchar, incumbent U.S. senator

==== Eliminated in primary ====
- Steve Carlson, business consultant and perennial candidate
- Ahmad Hassan, businessman and perennial candidate
- George Kalberer, financial management executive and candidate for Minnesota's 1st congressional district in 2022
- Ole Savior, artist and perennial candidate

=== Endorsements ===
Amy Klobuchar

U.S representatives

- Gabby Giffords, former U.S. representative from Arizona's 8th congressional district (2007–2012)

Organizations

- AIPAC
- EMILY's List
- End Citizens United
- Feminist Majority PAC
- Giffords
- J Street PAC
- Jewish Democratic Council of America
- Joint Action Committee for Political Affairs
- League of Conservation Voters
- Let America Vote
- Natural Resources Defense Council
- Planned Parenthood Action Fund
- Population Connection Action Fund

Political parties

- Minnesota Democratic–Farmer–Labor Party

=== Fundraising ===
Campaign finance reports as of July 24, 2024
Candidate	Raised	Spent	Cash on hand
Amy Klobuchar (DFL)	$18,972,719	$16,340,965	$6,567,231
Source: Federal Election Commission

=== Results ===
Results by county: Klobuchar—90.0–92.5% Klobuchar—92.5–95.0% Klobuchar—95.0–97.5% Klobuchar—97.5–100%

Klobuchar swept the primary, earning more than 90% of the vote in every county of the state. She recorded her best performance in Pope County, while her worst performance was in Anoka County. There, she came the closest to slipping below 90%, having won 90.00471% of the vote.

Democratic (DFL) primary results
Party	Candidate	Votes	%
Democratic (DFL)	Amy Klobuchar (incumbent)	305,055	94.29%
Democratic (DFL)	Steve Carlson	9,535	2.95%
Democratic (DFL)	Ahmad Hassan	4,891	1.51%
Democratic (DFL)	Ole Savior	2,478	0.77%
Democratic (DFL)	George Kalberer	1,578	0.49%
Total votes		323,537	100.0%

== Republican primary ==
=== Candidates ===
==== Nominee ====
- Royce White, former NBA player and candidate for Minnesota's 5th congressional district in 2022

==== Eliminated in primary ====
- John Berman, engineer and perennial candidate
- Loner Blue, retiree and convicted felon
- Joe Fraser, banker
- Alycia Gruenhagen, food co-op manager and Democratic candidate for Minnesota's 7th congressional district in 2020 and 2022
- Patrick Munro, landscaping company owner and perennial candidate
- Raymond Petersen, truck driver
- Christopher Seymore, teacher and perennial candidate

==== Declined ====
- Michelle Benson, former state senator (2011–2023) and candidate for governor in 2022
- Paul Gazelka, former Majority Leader of the Minnesota Senate (2017–2021) from the 9th district (2011–2023) and candidate for governor in 2022
- Walter Hudson, state representative (2023–present)
- Scott Jensen, former state senator (2017–2021) and nominee for governor in 2022
- Erik Paulsen, former U.S. representative from Minnesota's 3rd congressional district (2009–2019)
- Kendall Qualls, healthcare technology executive, nominee for Minnesota's 3rd congressional district in 2020, and candidate for governor in 2022
- Jim Schultz, lawyer and nominee for attorney general in 2022
- Ryan Wilson, medical device research company CEO and nominee for state auditor in 2022

=== Endorsements ===
Joe Fraser

U.S. senators

- Rudy Boschwitz, former U.S. senator from Minnesota (1978–1991)
- Norm Coleman, former U.S. senator from Minnesota (2003–2009)

Statewide officials

- Tim Pawlenty, former governor of Minnesota (2003–2011)

Organizations

- Republican Jewish Coalition
Royce White

U.S. representatives

- Matt Gaetz, U.S. representative from FL-01 (2017–2024)

Individuals

- Steve Bannon, former White House Chief Strategist and podcast host
- Alex Jones, Infowars owner and host
- Kari Lake, former KSAZ-TV news anchor
- Mike Lindell, CEO of MyPillow

Political parties

- Minnesota Republican Party

=== Fundraising ===
Campaign finance reports as of July 24, 2024
Candidate	Raised	Spent	Cash on hand
Joe Fraser (R)	$68,438	$45,860	$22,578
Royce White (R)	$132,721	$79,782	$52,940
Source: Federal Election Commission

=== Results ===
Results by county Map legend: White—20–30%; White—30–40%; White—40–50%; White—50–60%; Fraser—20–30%; Fraser—30–40%; Gruenhagen—30–40%; Gruenhagen—40–50%

Results by congressional district Map legend: White—30–40%; White—40–50%

Republican primary results
Party	Candidate	Votes	%
Republican	Royce White	74,814	38.50%
Republican	Joe Fraser	56,909	29.29%
Republican	Raymond Petersen	16,237	8.36%
Republican	Alycia Gruenhagen	15,017	7.73%
Republican	John Berman	14,158	7.29%
Republican	Patrick Munro	9,444	4.86%
Republican	Christopher Seymore	5,020	2.58%
Republican	Loner Blue	2,727	1.40%
Total votes		194,326	100.0%

== Third-party and independent candidates ==
=== Candidates ===
==== Declared ====
- Joyce Lacey (Independence—Alliance), guardianship advocate and Republican candidate for governor in 2022
- Rebecca Whiting (Libertarian), farmer

== General election ==
=== Predictions ===
Source	Ranking	As of
The Cook Political Report	Solid D	November 9, 2023
Inside Elections	Solid D	November 9, 2023
Sabato's Crystal Ball	Safe D	November 9, 2023
Decision Desk HQ/The Hill	Safe D	August 26, 2024
Elections Daily	Safe D	May 4, 2023
CNalysis	Solid D	November 21, 2023
RealClearPolitics	Solid D	August 5, 2024
Split Ticket	Safe D	October 30, 2024
538	Solid D	October 31, 2024

=== Polling ===
Aggregate polls

Source of poll aggregation	Dates administered	Dates updated	Amy Klobuchar (DFL)	Royce White (R)	Undecided (Note: Calculated by taking the difference of 100% and all other candidates combined.)	Margin
RealClearPolitics	October 16 - November 4, 2024	November 4, 2024	52.0%	39.0%	9.0%	Klobuchar +13.0%
538	through November 4, 2024	November 4, 2024	51.2%	38.4%	10.4%	Klobuchar +12.8%
270toWin	October 16 - November 4, 2024	November 4, 2024	49.7%	36.0%	14.3%	Klobuchar +13.7%
Average			51.0%	37.8%	11.2%	Klobuchar +13.2%

Poll source	Date(s) administered	Sample size (Note: Key: A – all adults RV – registered voters LV – likely voters V – unclear)	Margin of error	Amy Klobuchar (DFL)	Royce White (R)	Other	Undecided
AtlasIntel	November 1–4, 2024	2,065 (LV)	± 2.0%	53%	41%	4% (Note: "Other" with 2%; "Blank/Null/Won't vote" with 2%)	2%
Research Co.	November 2–3, 2024	450 (LV)	± 4.6%	55%	38%	3% (Note: "Some other candidate" with 3%)	4%
ActiVote	October 8–31, 2024	400 (LV)	± 4.9%	56%	44%	–	–
Chism Strategies	October 28–30, 2024	534 (LV)	± 4.2%	52%	35%	3% (Note: Joyce Lacey (I) with 2%; Rebecca Whiting (L) with 1%)	11%
SurveyUSA (Note: Poll sponsored by KSTP-TV, WDIO-TV, and KAAL)	October 24–28, 2024	728 (LV)	± 4.0%	52%	35%	3%	10%
Embold Research (Note: Poll sponsored by MinnPost)	October 16–22, 2024	1,734 (LV)	± 2.4%	52%	40%	2% (Note: "Would not vote" with 2%)	6%
Redfield & Wilton Strategies (Note: Poll sponsored by The Daily Telegraph)	October 12–14, 2024	544 (LV)	± 3.9%	42%	35%	5% (Note: "Won't vote if these are the candidates" with 2%; Lacey (I) with 2%; Whiting (L) with 1%)	19%
Redfield & Wilton Strategies	September 27 – October 2, 2024	551 (LV)	± 3.9%	46%	38%	6% (Note: "Won't vote if these are the candidates" with 3%; Lacey (I) with 2%; Whiting (L) with 1%)	11%
SurveyUSA	September 23–26, 2024	646 (LV)	± 4.3%	53%	35%	5%	8%
Redfield & Wilton Strategies	September 16–19, 2024	703 (LV)	± 3.5%	42%	34%	7% (Note: Lacey (I) with 3%; "Won't vote if these are the candidates" with 4%)	17%
Mason-Dixon Polling & Strategy (Note: Poll sponsored by the Star Tribune, Minnesota Public Radio, and KARE)	September 16–18, 2024	800 (LV)	± 3.5%	51%	40%	1% (Note: "Someone else" with 1%)	8%
Redfield & Wilton Strategies	September 6–9, 2024	617 (LV)	± 3.7%	42%	36%	5% (Note: Lacey (I) with 2%; Whiting (L), "Won't vote if these are the candidates", and "Other" with 1%)	16%
Embold Research	September 4–8, 2024	1,616 (LV)	± 2.8%	52%	41%	–	7%
SurveyUSA	August 27–29, 2024	635 (LV)	± 4.5%	50%	36%	4%	11%
Redfield & Wilton Strategies	August 25–28, 2024	426 (LV)	± 4.4%	41%	34%	8% (Note: Lacey (I) with 3%; "Won't vote if these are the candidates" with 3%; "Other" with 2%)	18%
SurveyUSA	July 23–25, 2024	656 (LV)	± 4.4%	55%	33%	4%	8%
Fox News	July 22–24, 2024	1,071 (RV)	± 3.0%	57%	40%	–	2%
Emerson College (Note: Poll sponsored by The Hill)	June 13–18, 2024	1,000 (RV)	± 3.0%	48%	37%	4%	10%
SurveyUSA	June 12–16, 2024	626 (LV)	± 4.5%	49%	35%	4%	12%

Hypothetical polling

Amy Klobuchar vs. Joe Fraser

Poll source	Date(s) administered	Sample size	Margin of error	Amy Klobuchar (DFL)	Joe Fraser (R)	Other	Undecided
SurveyUSA	July 23–25, 2024	656 (LV)	± 4.4%	54%	33%	4%	10%
Emerson College	June 13–18, 2024	1,000 (RV)	± 3.0%	47%	37%	5%	10%
SurveyUSA	June 12–16, 2024	626 (LV)	± 4.5%	49%	36%	4%	11%
SurveyUSA	May 8–11, 2024	625 (LV)	± 4.3%	48%	34%	5%	12%
SurveyUSA	April 3–7, 2024	608 (LV)	± 4.9%	51%	34%	6%	10%
SurveyUSA	February 23–28, 2024	1,603 (LV)	± 3.0%	49%	33%	5%	14%

=== Results ===
2024 United States Senate election in Minnesota
Party	Candidate	Votes	%	±%
Democratic (DFL)	Amy Klobuchar (incumbent)	1,792,441	56.20%	−4.11%
Republican	Royce White	1,291,712	40.50%	+4.29%
Libertarian	Rebecca Whiting	55,215	1.73%	N/A
Independence	Joyce Lacey	46,377	1.45%	N/A
Write-in		3,578	0.11%	+0.07%
Total votes		3,189,323	100.00%	N/A
Democratic (DFL) hold				

==== By county ====
County	Amy Klobuchar DFL		Royce White Republican		Rebecca Whiting Libertarian		Joyce Lacey Independence		Write-in		Margin		Total
County	Votes	%	Votes	%	Votes	%	Votes	%	Votes	%	Votes	%	Total
Aitkin	4,135	40.21%	5,857	56.95%	151	1.47%	131	1.27%	10	0.10%	-1,722	-16.74%	10,284
Anoka	106,871	51.85%	91,380	44.34%	4,140	2.01%	3,464	1.68%	256	0.12%	15,491	7.52%	206,111
Becker	7,539	38.71%	11,489	58.99%	206	1.06%	233	1.20%	8	0.04%	-3,950	-20.28%	19,475
Beltrami	12,390	50.43%	11,287	45.90%	447	1.82%	436	1.77%	18	0.07%	1,103	4.49%	24,578
Benton	8,435	37.81%	13,048	58.49%	455	2.04%	355	1.59%	15	0.07%	-4,613	-20.68%	22,308
Big Stone	1,225	43.67%	1,516	54.05%	32	1.14%	29	1.03%	3	0.11%	-291	-10.37%	2,805
Blue Earth	19,135	53.60%	15,185	42.54%	723	2.03%	618	1.73%	38	0.11%	3,950	11.06%	35,699
Brown	5,851	40.69%	8,137	56.58%	192	1.34%	196	1.36%	5	0.03%	-2,286	-15.90%	14,381
Carlton	11,056	54.19%	8,650	42.40%	334	1.64%	345	1.69%	17	0.08%	2,406	11.79%	20,402
Carver	34,470	50.60%	31,720	46.56%	1,160	1.70%	737	1.08%	41	0.06%	2,750	4.04%	68,128
Cass	7,294	38.28%	11,259	59.10%	238	1.25%	250	1.31%	11	0.06%	-3,965	-20.81%	19,052
Chippewa	2,748	44.09%'	3,320	53.26%	82	1.32%	80	1.28%	3	0.05%	-572	-9.18%	6,233
Chisago	13,673	39.14%	20,205	57.84%	563	1.61%	455	1.30%	36	0.10%	-6,532	-18.70%	34,932
Clay	17,750	55.24%	13,220	41.14%	587	1.83%	551	1.71%	26	0.08%	4,530	14.10%	32,134
Clearwater	1,379	29.26%	3,203	67.96%	71	1.51%	58	1.23%	2	0.04%	-1,824	-38.70%	4,713
Cook	2,517	69.65%	1,000	27.67%	45	1.25%	49	1.36%	3	0.08%	1,517	41.98%	3,614
Cottonwood	2,405	40.67%	3,328	56.28%	82	1.39%	97	1.64%	1	0.02%	-923	-15.61%	5,913
Crow Wing	16,451	39.48%	23,953	57.49%	630	1.51%	604	1.45%	26	0.06%	-7,502	-18.01%	41,664
Dakota	153,609	60.18%	93,160	36.50%	4,545	1.78%	3,621	1.42%	310	0.12%	60,449	23.68%	255,245
Dodge	4,905	39.87%	6,992	56.83%	206	1.67%	191	1.55%	9	0.07%	-2,087	-16.96%	12,303
Douglas	10,179	41.40%	13,741	55.89%	389	1.58%	267	1.09%	11	0.04%	-3,562	-14.49%	24,587
Faribault	3,091	40.30%	4,305	56.13%	129	1.68%	139	1.81%	6	0.08%	-1,214	-15.83%	7,670
Fillmore	5,428	44.53%	6,417	52.65%	167	1.37%	169	1.39%	8	0.07%	-989	-8.11%	12,189
Freeborn	7,818	47.84%	8,013	49.03%	233	1.43%	273	1.67%	6	0.04%	-195	-1.19%	16,343
Goodhue	13,629	48.03%	13,947	49.15%	446	1.57%	345	1.22%	7	0.02%	-318	-1.12%	28,374
Grant	1,576	44.99%	1,791	51.13%	46	1.31%	89	2.54%	1	0.03%	-215	-6.14%	3,503
Hennepin	513,644	72.77%	168,903	23.93%	12,196	1.73%	9,824	1.39%	1,260	0.18%	344,741	48.84%	705,827
Houston	4,811	43.00%	6,036	53.95%	175	1.56%	163	1.46%	3	0.03%	-1,225	-10.95%	11,188
Hubbard	5,208	38.69%	7,886	58.58%	210	1.56%	148	1.10%	9	0.07%	-2,678	-19.89%	13,461
Isanti	8,837	34.84%	15,642	61.67%	457	1.80%	407	1.60%	20	0.08%	-6,805	-26.83%	25,363
Itasca	11,741	44.39%	14,065	53.18%	358	1.35%	268	1.01%	15	0.06%	-2,324	-8.79%	26,447
Jackson	2,076	37.41%	3,327	59.95%	77	1.39%	68	1.23%	2	0.04%	-1,251	-22.54%	5,550
Kanabec	3,371	35.60%	5,797	61.22%	162	1.71%	136	1.44%	3	0.03%	-2,426	-25.62%	9,469
Kandiyohi	9,522	41.54%	12,797	55.83%	327	1.43%	263	1.15%	11	0.05%	-3,275	-14.29%	22,920
Kittson	1,189	48.31%	1,226	49.82%	18	0.73%	28	1.14%	0	0.00%	-37	-1.50%	2,461
Koochiching	2,940	44.18%	3,537	53.16%	88	1.32%	86	1.29%	3	0.05%	-597	-8.97%	6,654
Lac Qui Parle	1,790	45.40%	2,048	51.94%	50	1.27%	53	1.34%	2	0.05%	-258	-6.54%	3,943
Lake	3,916	57.23%	2,747	40.15%	99	1.45%	78	1.14%	2	0.03%	1,169	17.09%	6,842
Lake of the Woods	721	31.44%	1,514	66.03%	26	1.13%	32	1.40%	0	0.00%	-793	-34.58%	2,293
Le Sueur	6,994	40.86%	9,570	55.90%	277	1.62%	265	1.55%	13	0.08%	-2,576	-15.05%	17,119
Lincoln	1,258	39.58%	1,815	57.11%	45	1.42%	58	1.83%	2	0.06%	-557	-17.53%	3,178
Lyon	5,436	42.41%	6,976	54.42%	188	1.47%	210	1.64%	9	0.07%	-1,540	-12.01%	12,819
Mahnomen	1,084	50.65%	997	46.59%	23	1.07%	35	1.64%	1	0.05%	87	4.07%	2,140
Marshall	1,764	35.92%	3,010	61.29%	70	1.43%	64	1.30%	3	0.06%	-1,246	-25.37%	4,911
Martin	4,065	38.26%	6,272	59.04%	141	1.33%	139	1.31%	7	0.07%	-2,207	-20.77%	10,624
McLeod	8,209	39.25%	11,985	57.30%	370	1.77%	330	1.58%	21	0.10%	-3,776	-18.05%	20,915
Meeker	4,791	35.45%	8,306	61.46%	233	1.72%	179	1.32%	6	0.04%	-3,515	-26.01%	13,515
Mille Lacs	5,184	34.88%	9,099	61.22%	299	2.01%	273	1.84%	9	0.06%	-3,915	-26.34%	14,864
Morrison	5,793	29.13%	13,495	67.87%	283	1.42%	302	1.52%	12	0.06%	-7,702	-38.73%	19,885
Mower	9,386	50.57%	8,415	45.34%	332	1.79%	418	2.25%	10	0.05%	971	5.23%	18,561
Murray	1,760	37.55%	2,796	59.65%	51	1.09%	78	1.66%	2	0.04%	-1,036	-22.10%	4,687
Nicollet	10,408	54.48%	8,094	42.37%	317	1.66%	270	1.41%	14	0.07%	2,314	12.11%	19,103
Nobles	3,103	38.66%	4,654	57.98%	130	1.62%	139	1.73%	1	0.01%	-1,551	-19.32%	8,027
Norman	1,574	48.67%	1,549	47.90%	55	1.70%	55	1.70%	1	0.03%	25	0.77%	3,234
Olmsted	52,328	58.70%	34,077	38.23%	1,520	1.71%	1,160	1.30%	63	0.07%	18,251	20.47%	89,148
Otter Tail	14,125	39.10%	21,085	58.37%	398	1.10%	497	1.38%	19	0.05%	-6,960	-19.27%	36,124
Pennington	3,162	43.40%	3,879	53.24%	117	1.61%	122	1.68%	6	0.08%	-717	-9.84%	7,286
Pine	6,527	39.51%	9,431	57.09%	274	1.66%	274	1.66%	13	0.08%	-2,904	-17.58%	16,519
Pipestone	1,468	30.87%	3,154	66.33%	61	1.28%	67	1.41%	5	0.11%	-1,686	-35.46%	4,755
Polk	6,133	40.62%	8,558	56.68%	228	1.51%	171	1.13%	8	0.05%	-2,425	-16.06%	15,098
Pope	3,160	44.31%	3,768	52.84%	107	1.50%	91	1.28%	5	0.07%	-608	-8.53%	7,131
Ramsey	198,507	73.64%	60,719	22.52%	5,314	1.97%	4,513	1.67%	522	0.19%	137,788	51.11%	269,575
Red Lake	886	42.45%	1,127	54.00%	37	1.77%	33	1.58%	4	0.19%	-241	-11.55%	2,087
Redwood	3,075	37.34%	4,937	59.95%	104	1.26%	114	1.38%	5	0.06%	-1,862	-22.61%	8,235
Renville	3,231	40.64%	4,488	56.45%	96	1.21%	129	1.62%	7	0.09%	-1,257	-15.81%	7,951
Rice	19,235	53.88%	15,362	43.03%	595	1.67%	478	1.34%	31	0.09%	3,873	10.85%	35,701
Rock	1,810	34.32%	3,283	62.25%	88	1.67%	93	1.76%	0	0.00%	-1,473	-27.93%	5,274
Roseau	2,843	34.07%	5,262	63.06%	115	1.38%	123	1.47%	2	0.02%	-2,419	-28.99%	8,345
St. Louis	72,294	61.64%	41,273	35.19%	2,045	1.74%	1,534	1.31%	132	0.11%	31,021	26.45%	117,278
Scott	44,408	50.24%	41,018	46.40%	1,601	1.81%	1,289	1.46%	78	0.09%	3,390	3.84%	88,394
Sherburne	21,183	37.42%	33,341	58.90%	1,172	2.07%	875	1.55%	35	0.06%	-12,158	-21.48%	56,606
Sibley	3,199	38.06%	4,949	58.87%	142	1.69%	111	1.32%	5	0.06%	-1,750	-20.82%	8,406
Stearns	36,587	43.28%	45,225	53.49%	1,431	1.69%	1,231	1.46%	69	0.08%	-8,638	-10.22%	84,543
Steele	9,089	44.43%	10,601	51.83%	362	1.77%	386	1.89%	17	0.08%	-1,512	-7.39%	20,455
Stevens	2,266	44.84%	2,667	52.27%	63	1.25%	56	1.11%	2	0.04%	-401	-7.93%	5,054
Swift	2,164	43.53%	2,667	53.65%	61	1.23%	74	1.49%	5	0.10%	-503	-10.12%	4,971
Todd	4,403	32.71%	8,651	64.28%	184	1.37%	219	1.63%	2	0.01%	-4,248	-31.56%	13,459
Traverse	815	45.81%	906	50.93%	25	1.41%	33	1.85%	0	0.00%	-91	-5.12%	1,779
Wabasha	5,730	43.01%	7,194	53.99%	209	1.57%	186	1.40%	5	0.04%	-1,464	-10.99%	13,324
Wadena	2,398	30.36%	5,295	67.04%	105	1.33%	94	1.19%	6	0.08%	-2,897	-36.68%	7,898
Waseca	4,206	40.88%	5,789	56.27%	144	1.40%	147	1.43%	2	0.02%	-1,583	-15.39%	10,288
Washington	96,678	58.04%	64,562	38.76%	2,942	1.77%	2,249	1.35%	147	0.09%	32,116	19.28%	166,578
Watonwan	2,174	44.99%	2,488	51.49%	79	1.63%	89	1.84%	2	0.04%	-314	-6.50%	4,832
Wilkin	1,298	39.51%	1,875	57.08%	52	1.58%	59	1.80%	1	0.03%	-577	-17.56%	3,285
Winona	13,474	49.67%	12,806	47.21%	426	1.57%	409	1.51%	13	0.05%	668	2.46%	27,128
Wright	35,333	40.23%	49,500	56.36%	1,692	1.93%	1,255	1.43%	45	0.05%	-14,167	-16.13%	87,825
Yellow Medicine	2,121	39.55%	3,103	57.86%	70	1.31%	65	1.21%	4	0.07%	-982	-18.31%	5,363

===== Counties that flipped from Democratic to Republican =====
- Aitkin (largest city: Aitkin)
- Big Stone (largest city: Ortonville)
- Chippewa (largest city: Montevideo)
- Fillmore (largest city: Spring Valley)
- Freeborn (largest city: Albert Lea)
- Itasca (largest city: Grand Rapids)
- Goodhue (largest city: Red Wing)
- Grant (largest city: Elbow Lake)
- Houston (largest city: La Crescent)
- Kandiyohi (largest city: Willmar)
- Kittson (largest city: Hallock)
- Koochiching (largest city: International Falls)
- Lac qui Parle (largest city: Madison)
- Le Sueur (largest city: Le Sueur)
- Lyon (largest city: Marshall)
- Pennington (largest city: Thief River Falls)
- Pine (largest city: Pine City)
- Pope (largest city: Glenwood)
- Red Lake (largest city: Red Lake Falls)
- Renville (largest city: Olivia)
- Stearns (largest city: St. Cloud)
- Steele (largest city: Owatonna)
- Stevens (largest city: Morris)
- Swift (largest city: Benson)
- Traverse (largest city: Wheaton)
- Wabasha (largest city: Lake City)
- Waseca (largest city: Waseca)
- Watonwan (largest city: St. James)
- Wilkin (largest city: Breckenridge)
- Yellow Medicine (largest city: Granite Falls)

==== By congressional district ====
Klobuchar won five of eight congressional districts, including one that elected a Republican.

District	Klobuchar	White	Representative
1st	49.3%	47.5%	Brad Finstad
2nd	57.0%	39.6%	Angie Craig
3rd	63.2%	33.6%	Dean Phillips (118th Congress)
3rd	63.2%	33.6%	Kelly Morrison (119th Congress)
4th	70.1%	26.3%	Betty McCollum
5th	81.6%	14.8%	Ilhan Omar
6th	44.8%	51.8%	Tom Emmer
7th	39.7%	57.4%	Michelle Fischbach
8th	47.8%	49.0%	Pete Stauber

== See also ==
- Electoral history of Amy Klobuchar

== Notes ==
Partisan clients
