= 2026 Minnesota gubernatorial election =

- November 3, 2026
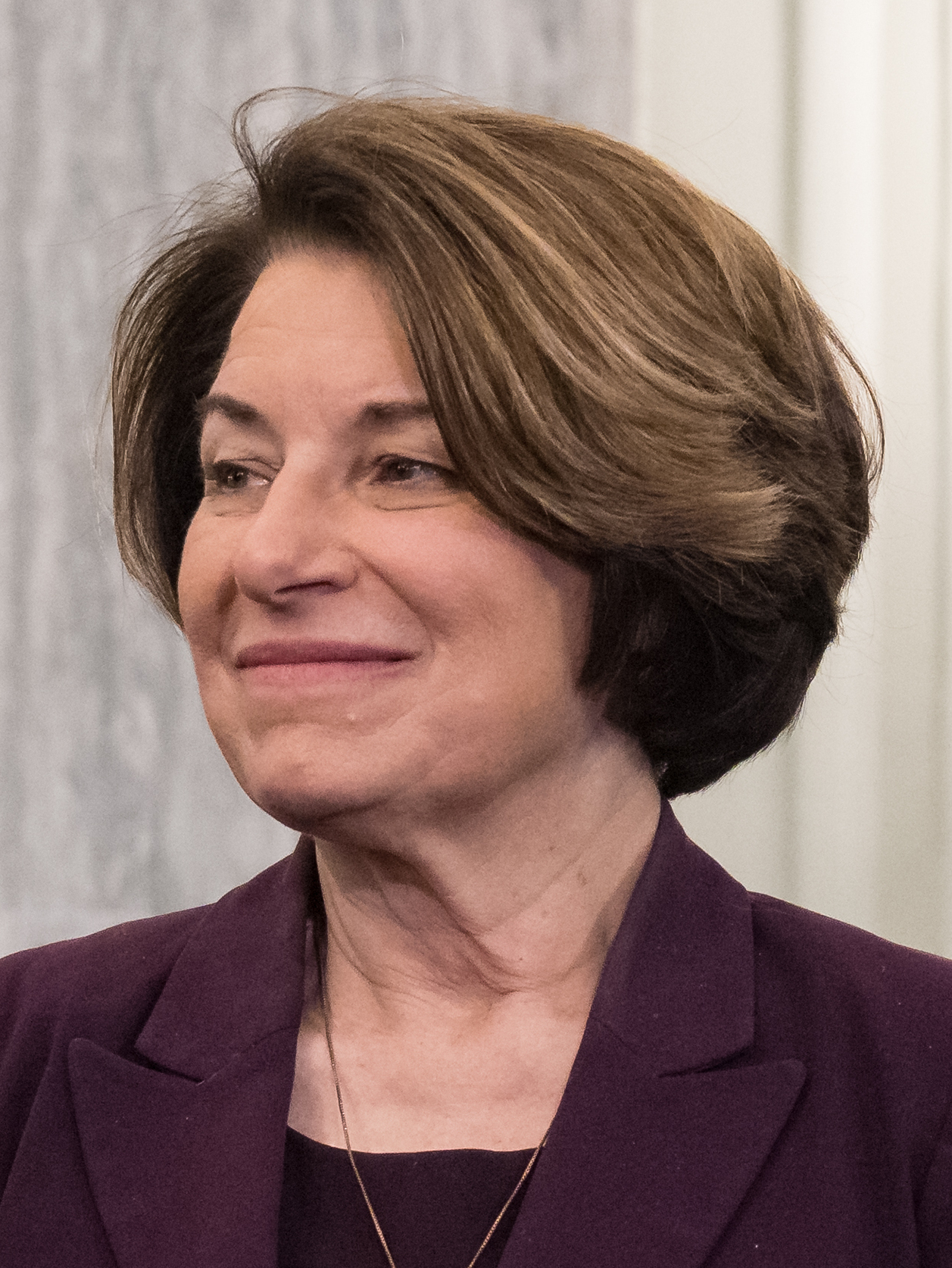

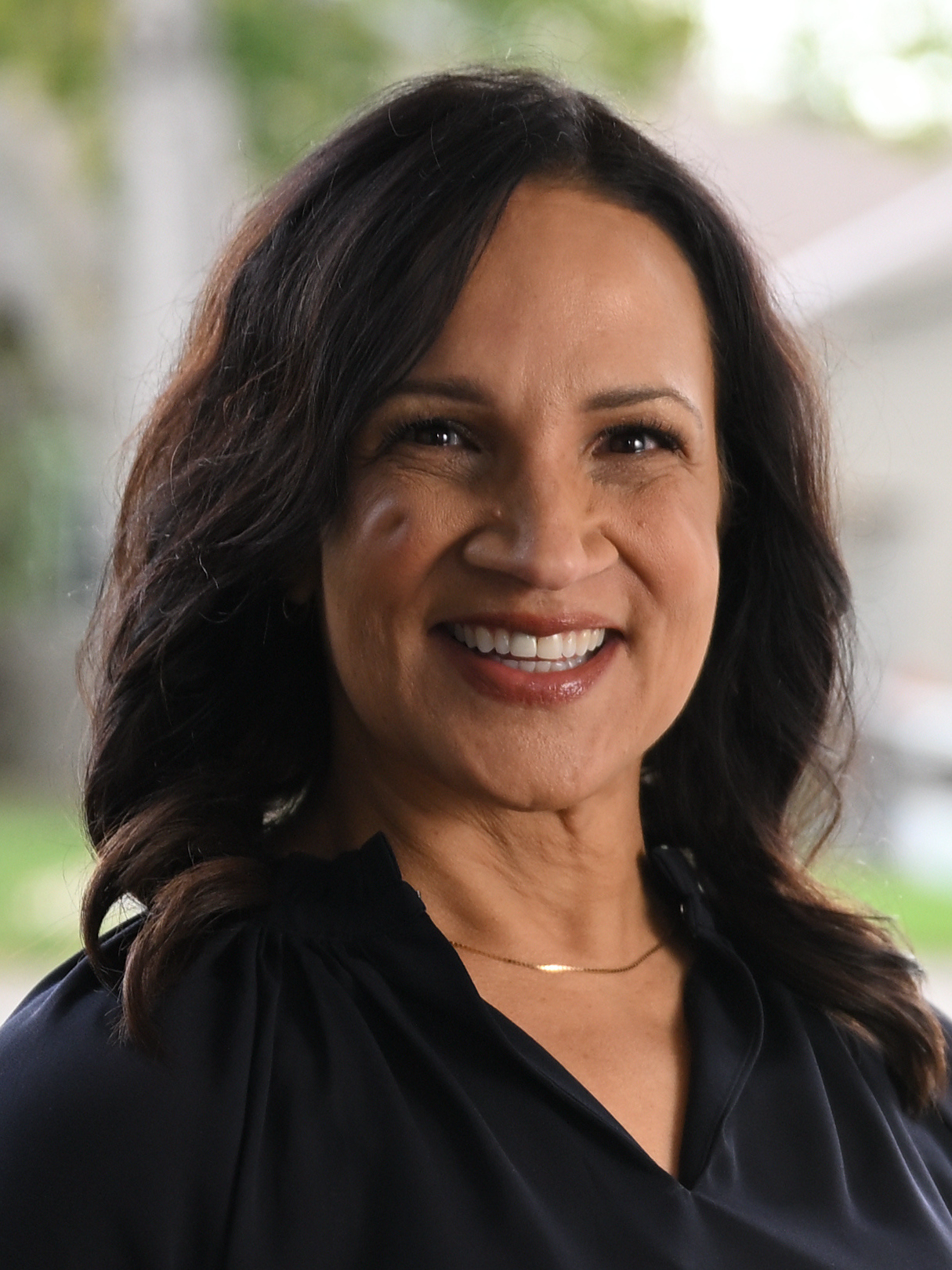
Nominee	Amy Klobuchar	Lisa Demuth
Party	Democratic (DFL)	Republican
Running mate	Ben Schierer	Ryan Wilson
Popular vote	1,569,698	1,206,583
Percentage	55.46%	42.63%
- Klobuchar: 40–50% 50–60% 60–70% 70–80% 80–90% >90% Demuth: 40–50% 50–60% 60–70% 70–80% 80–90% >90% Tie: 40–50% 50% No votes
Governor before election
Tim Walz
Democratic (DFL)
Elected Governor
Amy Klobuchar
Democratic (DFL)

The 2026 Minnesota gubernatorial election was held on November 3, 2026, to elect the governor and lieutenant governor of Minnesota. Democratic senator Amy Klobuchar defeated Republican state House speaker Lisa Demuth in the general election.

Democratic incumbent Tim Walz initially ran for a third term, but withdrew in January following a scandal over fraud in state funded-social services. Following Walz's withdrawal, Klobuchar entered the Democratic primary and won the nomination with 89.7% of the vote against minimal opposition. In the Republican primary, Demuth defeated businessman Mike Lindell, who was endorsed by President Donald Trump, and healthcare technology executive Kendall Qualls, who was endorsed by the state party, with 43.4% of the vote.

With her victory, Klobuchar will become the first female governor of Minnesota. Republicans have not won a gubernatorial election in Minnesota since 2006. Although this was Klobuchar's narrowest victory in any of her statewide campaigns, she won by the largest margin in a Minnesota gubernatorial election since 1994, and by the largest margin for a non-incumbent candidate since 1982.

== Democratic–Farmer–Labor primary ==
After Walz announced his withdrawal from the race, U.S. Senator Amy Klobuchar launched a campaign for the governor's office on January 29, 2026. Six other Democratic-Farmer-Labor (DFL) candidates filed, none of whom have previously held elected office. Community organizer Kobey Layne challenged Klobuchar for the DFL's endorsement on May 30, 2026, but Klobuchar was endorsed on the first ballot alongside her running mate, Ben Schierer.

=== Candidates ===
==== Nominee ====
- Amy Klobuchar, U.S. senator (2007–present)
  - Running mate: Ben Schierer, former mayor of Fergus Falls (2017–2025)

==== Eliminated in primary ====
- Tom Evenstad, public safety specialist
  - Running mate: Jason Haarsager
- Bill Gates Jr., former pastor (no relation to Microsoft co-founder Bill Gates)
  - Running mate: Leah Harris
- Kobey Layne, community organizer
  - Running mate: Paul Ference
- Po Vang
  - Running mate: Mark Frascone
- Ole "Viking" Savior, perennial candidate
  - Running mate: Ashley "Skol" Johnson
- Mohammad Wazwaz
  - Running mate: Murad Alshool

==== Not on ballot ====
- Sam Opal Boman
- Christopher Seymore

==== Withdrawn ====
- Rick DeVoe, bookstore owner and candidate for MN-01 in 2022
- Paul Ference (ran for lieutenant governor with Kobey Layne)
- Tim Walz, incumbent governor (2019–present)

==== Declined ====
- Angie Craig, U.S. representative from MN-02 (2019–present) (ran for U.S. Senate, endorsed Klobuchar)
- Keith Ellison, attorney general of Minnesota (2019–present) (running for reelection)
- Peggy Flanagan, lieutenant governor of Minnesota (2019–present) (running for U.S. Senate, endorsed Klobuchar)
- Dean Phillips, former U.S. representative from MN-03 (2019–2025) and candidate for president in 2024
- Steve Simon, secretary of state of Minnesota (2015–present) (running for reelection)
- Tina Smith, U.S. senator (2018–present)

=== Endorsements ===
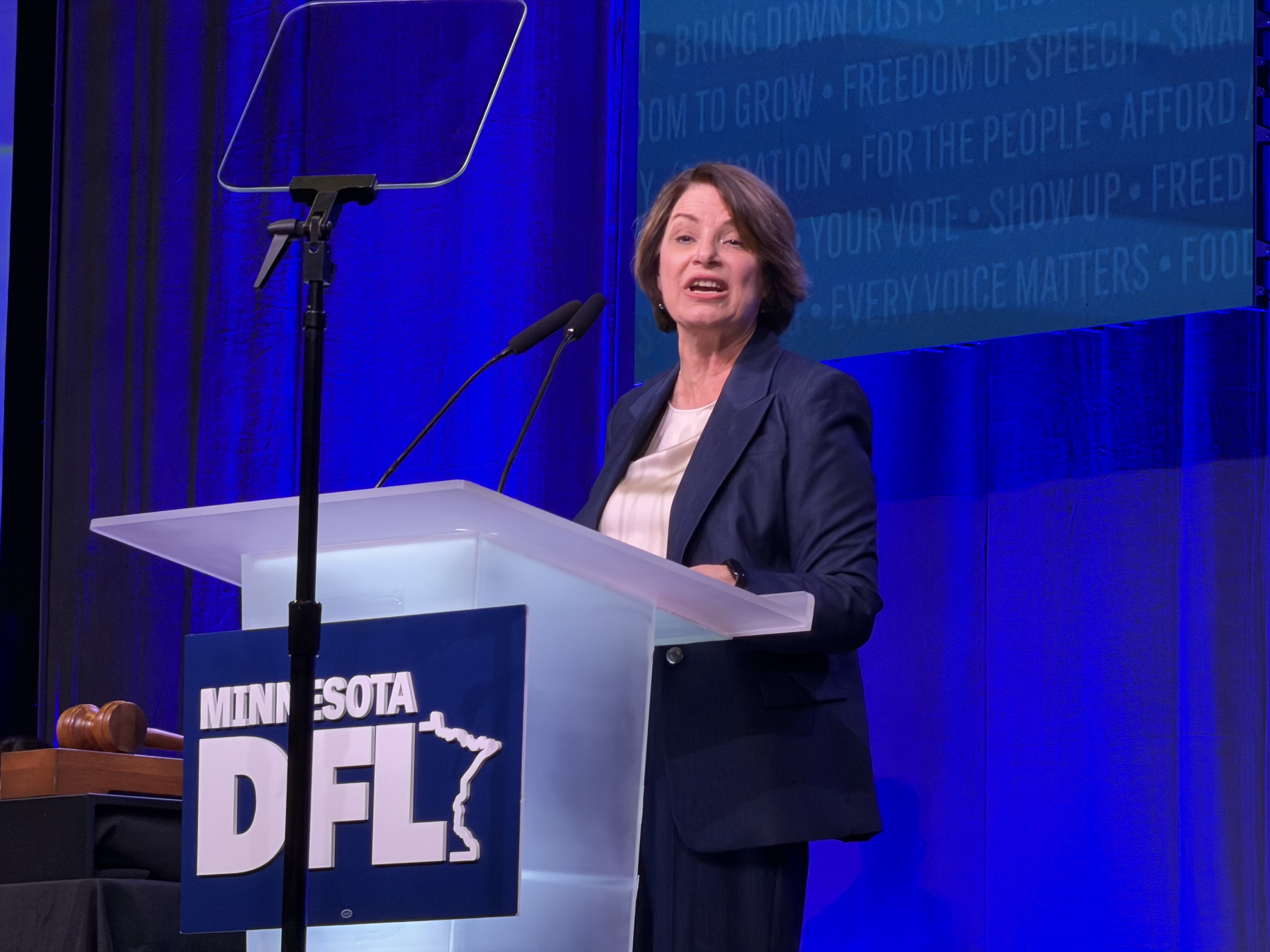
DFL nominee Amy Klobuchar at the DFL state endorsing convention

Kobey Layne

Organizations

- Stonewall DFL
Amy Klobuchar

Executive branch officials

- Pete Buttigieg, former secretary of transportation (2021–2025)

Labor unions

- AFL-CIO
- Education Minnesota
- SEIU Minnesota State Council
- Teamsters Joint Council 32
- United Steelworkers District 11

Organizations

- Elect Democratic Women
- EMILY's List
- End Citizens United
- Giffords (previously endorsed Walz)
- Natural Resources Defense Council Action Fund

Political parties

- Minnesota Democratic-Farmer-Labor Party
Tim Walz (withdrawn)

Labor unions

- Service Employees International Union Minnesota State Council

Organizations

- Democratic Governors Association
- ~~Giffords~~ (later endorsed Klobuchar)
- Planned Parenthood North Central States
- VoteVets

=== Fundraising ===
Italics indicate a withdrawn candidate.

Campaign finance reports as of May 31, 2026
Candidate	Raised	Spent	Cash on hand
Paul Ference (DFL) (Note: filed for Lieutenant governor with Kobey Layne)	$6,530	$3,543	$2,986
Bill Gates Jr. (DFL)	$884	$884	$0
Amy Klobuchar (DFL)	$7,045,318	$3,185,636	$3,859,683
Kobey Layne (DFL)	$4,618	$3,043	$1,574
Po Vang (DFL)	$749	$749	$0
Christopher Seymore (DFL)	$50	$0	$50
Tim Walz (DFL)	$169,091	$922,312	$3,138,504
Source: Minnesota Campaign Finance Board

=== Caucus vote ===
On February 3, 2026, Minnesota DFLers held their party caucus. Klobuchar won the party's straw poll for governor with approximately 72% of the vote.

==== Results ====
Results by reporting unit: Klobuchar: 50–60%; 60–70%; 70–80%; 80–90%; 90–100%; Uncommitted: 40–50%; 50–60%; 60–70%; 70–80%; Abstained: No votes

DFL caucus straw poll results
Party	Candidate	Votes	%
Democratic (DFL)	Amy Klobuchar	22,484	71.71%
Democratic (DFL)	Christopher Seymore	397	1.27%
Write-in		1,097	3.50%
None	Uncommitted	6,722	21.44%
None	Abstained	655	2.09%
Total votes		31,355	100.00%

=== Results ===
Primary results by county: Klobuchar: 80–90%; >90%

Primary results by congressional district: Klobuchar: 80–90%; >90%

Primary results by state senate district: Klobuchar: 70–80%; 80–90%; >90%

Primary results by state house district: Klobuchar: 70–80%; 80–90%; >90%

Primary results by precinct: Klobuchar: 40–50%; 50–60%; 60–70%; 70–80%; 80–90%; >90%; Layne: 60–70%; >90%; Savior: 60–70%; Evenstad: >90%; Gates: >90%; Tie: 30–40%; 40–50%; 50%; No Votes

Democratic primary results
Party	Candidate	Votes	%
Democratic (DFL)	Amy Klobuchar	615,041	89.7
Democratic (DFL)	Kobey Layne	39,528	5.8
Democratic (DFL)	Mohammad Wazwaz	9,633	1.4
Democratic (DFL)	Po Vang	8,834	1.3
Democratic (DFL)	Ole "Viking" Savior	5,491	0.8
Democratic (DFL)	Tom Evenstad	3,843	0.6
Democratic (DFL)	Bill Gates Jr.	3,380	0.5
Total votes		685,750	100.0

== Republican primary ==
=== Candidates ===
Republican nominee Lisa Demuth campaigning at the Stearns County Fair

==== Nominee ====
- Lisa Demuth, speaker of the Minnesota House of Representatives (2025–present) from district 13A (2019–present)
  - Running mate: Ryan Wilson, attorney and nominee for state auditor in 2022

==== Eliminated in primary ====
- Loner Blue, perennial candidate
  - Running mate: Andrew Maass
- Raul Estrada, construction worker and organizer with the American Indian Coalition
  - Running mate: Joe Kincaid
- John Krhin, pastor
  - Running mate: Dennis Conn
- Mike Lindell, founder and former CEO of My Pillow and candidate for RNC chair in 2023
  - Running mate: Phillip Parrish, retired Naval intelligence officer, teacher, and school administrator
- Ross Nova
  - Running mate: Kerry Busby
- Kendall Qualls, healthcare technology executive, nominee for Minnesota's 3rd congressional district in 2020, and candidate for governor in 2022
  - Running mate: Brian Nicholson, construction firm chief executive

==== Not on ballot ====
- Patrick Knight, food company CEO

==== Withdrawn ====
- Peggy Bennett, state representative from district 23A (2015–present) (withdrew after her running mate dropped out)
- Scott Jensen, former state senator from the 47th district (2017–2021) and nominee for governor in 2022 (running for state auditor)
- Jeff Johnson, former St. Cloud city councilor (2010–2018) (Note: No relation to previous gubernatorial nominee Jeff Johnson.)
- Chris Madel, attorney
- Phillip Parrish, retired Naval intelligence officer, teacher, and school administrator (running for lieutenant governor as Mike Lindell's running mate)
- Kristin Robbins, state representative from district 37A (2019–present)
- Lee Albert Wickboldt

==== Declined ====
- Zach Duckworth, state senator from the 57th district (2021–present) (running for reelection)
- Tom Emmer, U.S. representative from Minnesota's 6th congressional district (2015–present) and nominee for governor in 2010
- Tim Pawlenty, former governor of Minnesota (2003–2011)
- Pete Stauber, U.S. representative from Minnesota's 8th congressional district (2019–present)

=== Endorsements ===
Lisa Demuth

State legislators

- Bidal Duran, state representative from district 2A (2025–present)
- Spencer Igo, state representative from district 7A (2021–present)
- Carla Nelson, state senator from district 24 (2011–present)

Organizations

- Minnesota Gun Owners Caucus
- National Rifle Association Political Victory Fund
Mike Lindell

Executive branch officials

- Donald Trump, president of the United States (2017–2021, 2025–present)

Organizations

- Conservative Political Action Conference
Kendall Qualls

Political parties

- Republican Party of Minnesota
Declined to endorse

State legislators

- Kristin Robbins, state representative from district 37A (2019–present) and former gubernatorial candidate

=== Fundraising ===
Italics indicate a withdrawn candidate

Campaign finance reports as of May 31, 2026
Candidate	Raised	Spent	Cash on hand
Lisa Demuth (R)	$360,892	$286,293	$517,679
Raul Estrada (R)	$4,765	$4,854	$20
John Krhin (R)	$58,266	$52,722	$2,044
Mike Lindell (R)	$648,960	$717,491	$11,704
Ross Nova (R)	$6,000	$3,048	$2,952
Kendall Qualls (R)	$211,305	$294,731	$34,189
Source: Minnesota Campaign Finance Board

=== Polling ===
Poll source	Date(s) administered	Sample size (Note: Key: A – all adults RV – registered voters LV – likely voters V – unclear)	Margin of error	Lisa Demuth	Scott Jensen	Mike Lindell	Kendall Qualls	Kristin Robbins	Other	Undecided
KTSP/SurveyUSA	July 29–August 4, 2026	458 (LV)	± 5.6%	28%	–	34%	17%	–	6%	16%
SurveyUSA (Note: Poll sponsored by KSTP-TV)	July 15–20, 2026	478 (LV)	± 5.4%	26%	–	35%	11%	–	5%	22%
Big Data Poll (R) (Note: Poll sponsored by Lindell's campaign)	June 26–29, 2026	1,214 (LV)	± 2.8%	20%	–	25%	10%	–	11% (Note: John Krhin with 4%; Raul Estrada with 3%; Loner Blue and Ross Nova with 2%)	34%
Minnesota Private Business Council (R)	June 23–25, 2026	1,601 (LV)	± 2.5%	29%	–	20%	24%	–	1% (Note: Loner Blue, Raul Estrada, John Krhin, and Ross Nova with a combined 1%)	26%
Minnesota Private Business Council (R)	June 23–25, 2026	1,601 (LV)	± 2.5%	34% (Note: With voters who lean towards a given candidate)	–	24%	28%	–	–	14%
SurveyUSA	June 11–16, 2026	450 (LV)	± 5.4%	22%	–	27%	17%	–	10% (Note: "Another Republican" with 10%)	24%
Big Data Poll (R)	May 18–20, 2026	512 (LV)	–	19%	–	21%	9%	–	12% (Note: Patrick Knight with 4%; Peggy Bennett with 3%; Phil Parrish and John Krhin with 2%; Raul Estrada with 1%)	39%
	May 1, 2026	Robbins withdraws from the race								
	February 9, 2026	Jensen withdraws from the race								
Peak Insights (R) (Note: Poll sponsored by Michele Tafoya's campaign for U.S. Senate)	January 31 – February 1, 2026	500 (LV)	± 4.0%	17%	12%	18%	11%	3%	7% (Note: "Someone else" with 2%; Peggy Bennett, Thomas Evanstad, Jeff Johnson, Brad Kohler, and Phil Parrish with 1%; Patrick Knight with 0%)	32%

=== Caucus vote ===
On February 3, 2026, Minnesota Republicans held their party caucus. Lisa Demuth won the party's straw poll for governor with approximately 32% of the vote.

==== Results ====
Results by reporting unit: Demuth: 20–30%; 30–40%; 40–50%; 50–60%; 60–70%; 70–80%; 80–90%; Qualls: 20–30%; 30–40%; 40–50%; 50–60%; Lindell: 20–30%; 30–40%; 40–50%; 50–60%; Robbins: 30–40%; Parrish: 20–30%; Bennett: 40–50%; Undecided: 30–40%; Hashes indicate a tie.

Republican caucus straw poll results
Party	Candidate	Votes	%
Republican	Lisa Demuth	5,827	31.86%
Republican	Kendall Qualls	4,624	25.28%
Republican	Mike Lindell	3,235	17.69%
Republican	Scott Jensen	1,185	6.48%
Republican	Kristin Robbins	776	4.24%
Republican	Phil Parrish	728	3.98%
Republican	Patrick Knight	362	1.98%
Republican	Jeff Johnson	139	0.76%
Republican	Peggy Bennett	112	0.61%
Republican	Brad Kohler	78	0.43%
Republican	Raul Estrada	62	0.34%
Republican	John Krhin	59	0.32%
Write-in		56	0.31%
None	Undecided	1,046	5.72%
Total votes		18,289	100.00%

==== Debates ====
2026 Minnesota gubernatorial election Republican primary debates
No.	Date	Host	Moderator	Link	Republican	Republican	Republican	Republican	Republican	Republican	Republican	Republican	Republican	Republican	Republican
Key: P Participant A Absent N Not invited I Invited W Withdrawn															
Key: P Participant A Absent N Not invited I Invited W Withdrawn					Peggy Bennett	Lisa Demuth	Raul Estrada	Scott Jensen	Jeff Johnson	Patrick Knight	Brad Kohler	Mike Lindell	Chris Madell	Phil Parrish	Kendall Qualls
1	Jan. 15, 2026	Scott County Republican Party	Bill Lieske	YouTube	P	P	P	P	P	P	P	P	P	P	P
2	Mar. 11, 2026	Second Congressional District Republicans	Tayler Rahm	YouTube	N	P	N	W	W	P	N	N	W	N	P
3	May 21, 2026	KTTC; Republican Party of Olmsted County		YouTube	N	P	N	W	W	P	N	N	W	N	P

=== Results ===
Primary results by county: Demuth: 30–40%; 40–50%; 50–60%; 60–70%; Lindell: 30–40%; 40–50%; Qualls: 30–40%; Tie: 30–40%; 40–50%

Primary results by congressional district: Demuth: 30–40%; 40–50%; 50–60%; Lindell: 30–40%

Primary results by state senate district: Demuth: 30–40%; 40–50%; 50–60%; 60–70%; Lindell: 30–40%; 40–50%

Primary results by state house district: Demuth: 30–40%; 40–50%; 50–60%; 70–80%; Lindell: 30–40%; 40–50%

Primary results by precinct: Demuth: 30–40%; 40–50%; 50–60%; 60–70%; 70–80%; 80–90%; >90%; Lindell: 20–30%; 30–40%; 40–50%; 50–60%; 60–70%; 70–80%; 80–90%; >90%; Qualls: 30–40%; 40–50%; 50–60%; 60–70%; 70–80%; >90%; Krhin: 80–90%; Nova: >90%; Estrada: 40–50%; >90%; Blue: >90%; Tie: 20–30%; 30–40%; 40–50%; 50%; No votes

Republican primary results
Party	Candidate	Votes	%
Republican	Lisa Demuth	179,683	43.4
Republican	Mike Lindell	134,282	32.5
Republican	Kendall Qualls	88,416	21.4
Republican	John Krhin	4,663	1.1
Republican	Ross Nova	2,760	0.7
Republican	Raul Estrada	2,408	0.6
Republican	Loner Blue	1,393	0.3
Total votes		413,605	100.0

== Independents and others ==
=== Candidates ===
==== Declared ====
- Steve Young, member of the Minneapolis Food Council, attorney, and veteran (Green)
  - Running mate: Jane Kirby, retired midwife and animal rights activist

==== Write-in candidates ====
- Rhonda Gilliland
  - Running mate: Gene Peter Klepnev
- Timothy Holden, 2018 gubernatorial candidate and candidate for mayor of St. Paul in 2013 and 2017
  - Running mate: Ronald Adams
- Richard Kielty
  - Running mate: Tabitha Hallin
- Brad Kohler, retired mixed martial arts fighter (previously registered as a Republican)
  - Running mate: Shauna Breyer
- Steven Patterson, Grassroots-Legalize Cannabis gubernatorial nominee in 2022
  - Running mate: JT Thompson

==== Not on ballot ====
- Tom Berhane
- Zac Harding
- Adam Kedrowski
- Brad Kohler, retired mixed martial arts fighter (previously registered as a Republican)
- Steve Patterson, Grassroots-LC nominee for governor in 2022

==== Withdrawn ====
- Calvin Larson Jr., labor union leader (running for State Senate District 2)
- Mike Newcome, entrepreneur and business consultant

=== Endorsements ===
Mike Newcome (I) (withdrawn)

Political parties

- Forward-Independence Party

=== Fundraising ===
Campaign finance reports as of March 31, 2026
Candidate	Raised	Spent	Cash on Hand
Steve Young (G)	$1,586	$369	$1,218
Source: Minnesota Campaign Finance Board

== General election ==
=== Predictions ===
Source	Ranking	As of
The Cook Political Report	Solid D	October 29, 2026
Decision Desk HQ	Likely D	November 3, 2026
Fox News	Likely D	November 1, 2026
Inside Elections	Likely D	October 29, 2026
NBC News	Solid D	November 3, 2026
RealClearPolitics	Likely D	November 1, 2026
Sabato's Crystal Ball	Safe D	November 2, 2026
Silver Bulletin	Solid D	November 3, 2026

=== Post-primary endorsements ===
Amy Klobuchar (DFL)

Organizations

- Everytown for Gun Safety
- Human Rights Campaign
Lisa Demuth (R)

Organizations

- Maggie's List

=== Polling ===
Aggregate polls

Source of poll aggregation	Dates administered	Dates updated	Amy Klobuchar (DFL)	Lisa Demuth (R)	Other/ Undecided (Note: Calculated by taking the difference of 100% and all other candidates combined.)	Margin
270toWin	October 5 – November 1, 2026	November 2, 2026	52.4%	41.0%	6.6%	Klobuchar +11.4%
Decision Desk HQ	through November 1, 2026	November 2, 2026	52.7%	40.3%	7.0%	Klobuchar +12.4%
FiftyPlusOne	through November 1, 2026	November 2, 2026	52.3%	40.6%	7.1%	Klobuchar +11.7%
RealClearPolitics	October 2–28, 2026	October 30, 2026	51.3%	39.3%	9.4%	Klobuchar +12.0%
Silver Bulletin	through November 1, 2026	November 2, 2026	52.4%	40.2%	7.4%	Klobuchar +12.2%
Average			52.2%	40.3%	7.5%	Klobuchar +11.9%

Poll source	Date(s) administered	Sample size	Margin of error	Amy Klobuchar (DFL)	Lisa Demuth (R)	Other	Undecided
Research Co.	October 30 – November 1, 2026	450 (LV)	± 4.6%	53%	40%	1% (Note: Steven Young (G) with 1%)	6%
Survey 160	October 27 – November 1, 2026	1,365 (LV)	± 3.7%	53%	43%	3%	1%
Survey 160	October 27 – November 1, 2026	1,365 (LV)	± 3.7%	53%	42%	2%	2%
Survey 160	October 27 – November 1, 2026	1,423 (RV)	± 3.7%	53%	42%	3%	1%
Survey 160	October 27 – November 1, 2026	1,423 (RV)	± 3.7%	53%	41%	3%	3%
KSTP/SurveyUSA	October 24–28, 2026	718 (LV)	± 4.2%	51%	39%	3% (Note: Steven Young (G) with 3%)	8%
State Navigate	October 26–28, 2026	806 (LV)	± 3.5%	52%	42%	2% (Note: Young with 2%)	3%
New York Times/Siena University	October 19–26, 2026	752 (LV)	± 4.1%	56%	38%	0%	6%
Victory Insights (R) (Note: Poll commissioned by Michele Tafoya, the Republican nominee for U.S. Senate in Minnesota.)	October 21–22, 2026	1,194 (LV)	—	50%	43%	2%	4%
KSTP/SurveyUSA	October 8–12, 2026	718 (LV)	± 4.2%	48%	41%	3% (Note: Steven Young (G) with 3%)	8%
Mason-Dixon Polling & Strategy (Note: Poll sponsored by KARE 11 & The Minnesota Star Tribune)	October 5–7, 2026	800 (LV)	± 3.5%	50%	41%	1%	8%
Morning Consult (D) (Note: Poll conducted for The Daily Agenda)	October 2–7, 2026	1,000 (RV)	± 3.1%	48%	39%	4% (Note: "Another candidate" with 4%)	9%
co/efficient (R)	September 14–15, 2026	833 (LV)	± 3.4%	47%	45%	–	9%
KSTP/SurveyUSA	September 9–14, 2026	654 (LV)	± 4.4%	47%	40%	3% (Note: Steven Young (G) with 3%)	9%
TIPP Insights (R) (Note: Poll sponsored by the League of American Workers)	August 31 – September 2, 2026	1,494 (RV)	± 2.7%	47%	37%	8% (Note: Steven Young (G) & "Someone else" with 4%)	9%
TIPP Insights (R)	August 31 – September 2, 2026	1,201 (LV)	± 3.0%	50%	40%	6% (Note: Steven Young (G) & "Someone else" with 3%)	4%
KTSP/SurveyUSA	August 13–17, 2026	661 (LV)	± 4.3%	51%	36%	1% (Note: Steve Young (G) with 1%)	12%
	August 11, 2026	Primary elections are held					
Mason-Dixon Polling & Strategy (Note: Poll sponsored by the Hubbard School of Journalism and Mass Communication, KARE 11, and The Minneapolis Star Tribune)	June 8–10, 2026	800 (LV)	± 3.5%	48%	40%	–	12%
Emerson College	February 6–8, 2026	1,000 (LV)	± 3.0%	51%	38%	5% (Note: "Someone else" with 5%)	6%
SurveyUSA	January 27–30, 2026	575 (RV)	± 4.8%	49%	34%	–	17%

Hypothetical polling

Amy Klobuchar vs. Peggy Bennett

Poll source	Date(s) administered	Sample size	Margin of error	Amy Klobuchar (DFL)	Peggy Bennett (R)	Undecided
SurveyUSA	January 27–30, 2026	575 (RV)	± 4.8%	50%	30%	20%

Amy Klobuchar vs. Scott Jensen

Poll source	Date(s) administered	Sample size	Margin of error	Amy Klobuchar (DFL)	Scott Jensen (R)	Undecided
SurveyUSA	January 27–30, 2026	575 (RV)	± 4.8%	49%	35%	16%

Amy Klobuchar vs. Jeff Johnson

Poll source	Date(s) administered	Sample size	Margin of error	Amy Klobuchar (DFL)	Jeff Johnson (R)	Undecided
SurveyUSA	January 27–30, 2026	575 (RV)	± 4.8%	50%	33%	17%

Amy Klobuchar vs. Patrick Knight

Poll source	Date(s) administered	Sample size	Margin of error	Amy Klobuchar (DFL)	Patrick Knight (R)	Undecided
SurveyUSA	January 27–30, 2026	575 (RV)	± 4.8%	49%	33%	18%

Amy Klobuchar vs. Brad Kohler as a Republican

Poll source	Date(s) administered	Sample size	Margin of error	Amy Klobuchar (DFL)	Brad Kohler (R)	Undecided
SurveyUSA	January 27–30, 2026	575 (RV)	± 4.8%	49%	32%	19%

Amy Klobuchar vs. Mike Lindell

Poll source	Date(s) administered	Sample size	Margin of error	Amy Klobuchar (DFL)	Mike Lindell (R)	Undecided
Mason-Dixon Polling & Strategy	June 8–10, 2026	800 (LV)	± 3.5%	53%	36%	11%
Emerson College	February 6–8, 2026	1,000 (LV)	± 3.0%	53%	31%	16%
SurveyUSA	January 27–30, 2026	575 (RV)	± 4.8%	52%	32%	16%

Amy Klobuchar vs. Phil Parrish

Poll source	Date(s) administered	Sample size	Margin of error	Amy Klobuchar (DFL)	Phil Parrish (R)	Undecided
SurveyUSA	January 27–30, 2026	575 (RV)	± 4.8%	49%	32%	19%

Amy Klobuchar vs. Kendall Qualls

Poll source	Date(s) administered	Sample size	Margin of error	Amy Klobuchar (DFL)	Kendall Qualls (R)	Undecided
Mason-Dixon Polling & Strategy	June 8–10, 2026	800 (LV)	± 3.5%	48%	37%	14%
SurveyUSA	January 27–30, 2026	575 (RV)	± 4.8%	49%	33%	18%

Amy Klobuchar vs. Kristin Robbins

Poll source	Date(s) administered	Sample size	Margin of error	Amy Klobuchar (DFL)	Kristin Robbins (R)	Undecided
SurveyUSA	January 27–30, 2026	575 (RV)	± 4.8%	48%	33%	19%

Tim Walz vs. Scott Jensen

Poll source	Date(s) administered	Sample size	Margin of error	Tim Walz (DFL)	Scott Jensen (R)	Undecided
SurveyUSA	September 15–18, 2025	568 (LV)	± 4.8%	46%	41%	13%

Tim Walz vs. Phil Parrish

Poll source	Date(s) administered	Sample size	Margin of error	Tim Walz (DFL)	Phil Parrish (R)	Undecided
SurveyUSA	September 15–18, 2025	568 (LV)	± 4.8%	49%	38%	13%

Tim Walz vs. Kendall Qualls

Poll source	Date(s) administered	Sample size	Margin of error	Tim Walz (DFL)	Kendall Qualls (R)	Undecided
SurveyUSA	September 15–18, 2025	568 (LV)	± 4.8%	50%	37%	13%

Tim Walz vs. Kristin Robbins

Poll source	Date(s) administered	Sample size	Margin of error	Tim Walz (DFL)	Kristin Robbins (R)	Undecided
SurveyUSA	September 15–18, 2025	568 (LV)	± 4.8%	47%	40%	13%

Tim Walz vs. Generic Republican

Poll source	Date(s) administered	Sample size	Margin of error	Tim Walz (DFL)	Generic Republican	Undecided
RMG Research (Note: Poll sponsored by Alpha News)	December 10–16, 2025	800 (RV)	± 3.5%	40%	46%	14%

=== Results ===
2026 Minnesota gubernatorial election
Party	Candidate	Votes	%	±%
Democratic (DFL)	Amy Klobuchar; Ben Schierer	1,569,698	55.46	+3.20
Republican	Lisa Demuth; Ryan Wilson	1,206,583	42.63	−1.98
Green	Steven Young; Jane Kirby	51,404	1.82	+1.82
Write-in		2,474	0.09	+0.05
Total votes		2,830,159	100.0	
Democratic (DFL) hold				

Counties that flipped from Republican to Democratic

- Anoka (largest city: Blaine)
- Beltrami (largest city: Bemidji)
- Mower (largest city: Austin)
- Winona (largest city: Winona)

==== By congressional district ====
Klobuchar and Demuth each won four congressional districts.

District	Klobuchar	Demuth	Elected Representative
1st	47.48%	50.51%	Jake Johnson
2nd	55.95%	42.25%	Matt Little
3rd	62.78%	35.67%	Kelly Morrison
4th	71.32%	26.49%	Betty McCollum
5th	83.33%	14.03%	Ilhan Omar
6th	43.04%	55.34%	Tom Emmer
7th	33.70%	64.65%	Michelle Fischbach
8th	45.58%	52.57%	Pete Stauber

== See also ==
- 2026 Minnesota elections
- 2026 United States gubernatorial elections
- Electoral history of Amy Klobuchar

== Notes ==
Partisan clients
