= Boycott of The Ingraham Angle =

2018 advertising boycott

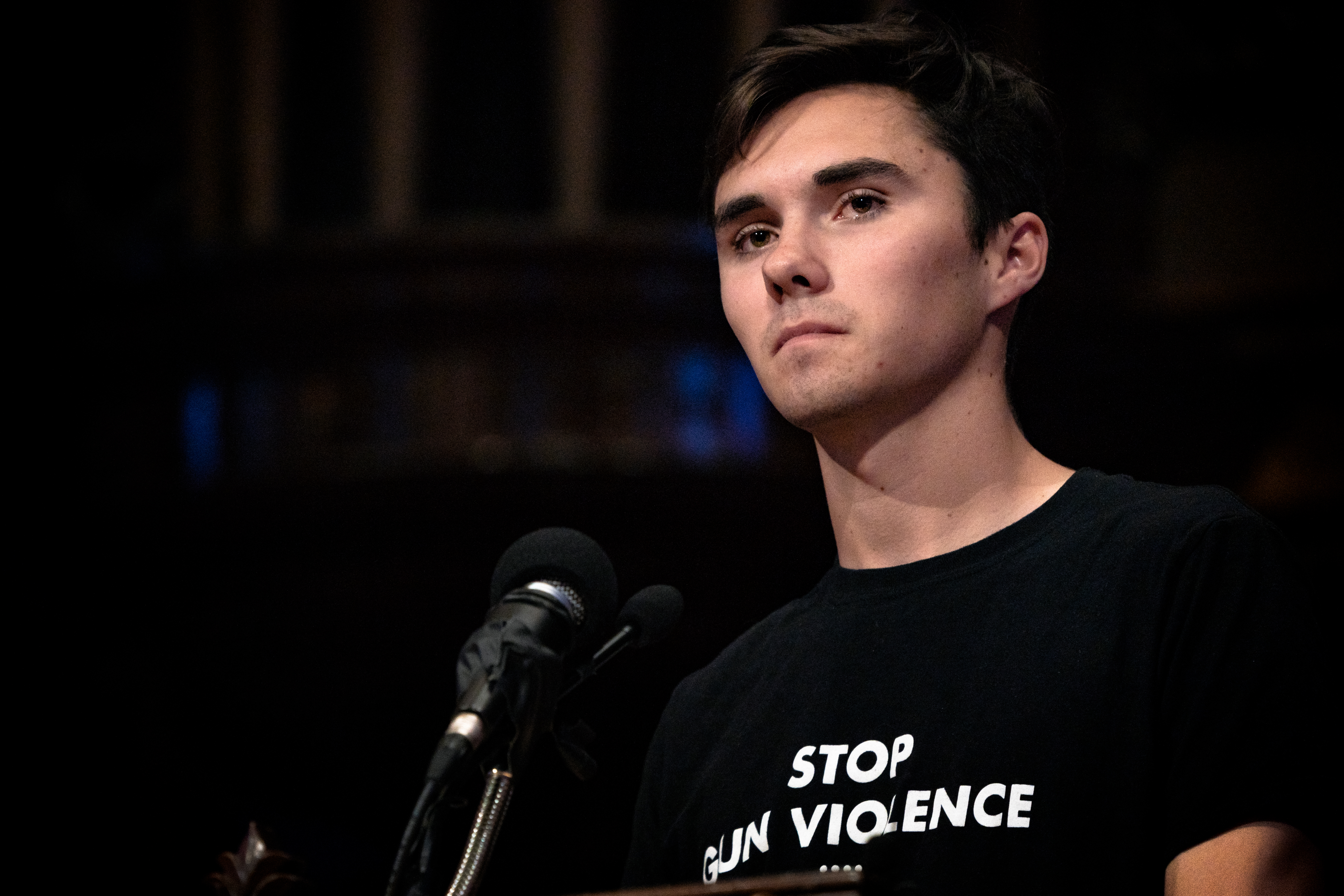
Marjory Stoneman Douglas High School student and shooting survivor David Hogg initiated the boycott in response to criticism of his activism.

The boycott of The Ingraham Angle was a boycott of companies that advertise their products during the Fox News television show The Ingraham Angle. Marjory Stoneman Douglas High School student David Hogg initiated this boycott after the show's host, Laura Ingraham, ridiculed him amidst conspiracy theories related to the shooting at his school in 2018, in which seventeen people were murdered and where Hogg was a witness and survivor. Ingraham' had mocked Hogg after he was rejected by four colleges despite his high GPA.

Hogg accused Ingraham of cyberbullying and he suggested that his followers tell her show's sponsors to cancel their advertising purchases. In response, several advertisers left the show, after which Ingraham apologized. Hogg dismissed the apology as insincere, and he and his supporters continued the pressure campaign on her show's advertisers.

More than 20 sponsors stopped advertising on the show. Public polling showed that public perception of Fox News declined more than that of any advertiser. Advertising rates for the show declined slightly, and the amount of advertising during the show was reduced by as much as half.

The boycott resulted in mixed reactions. Supporters of Ingraham's position included her employer Fox News, musician Ted Nugent, and Russian web brigades. Back on the air after a week on a pre-planned vacation, Ingraham described the boycott as "Stalinist" and blamed leftists for working against free speech. Hogg intensified the boycott in following months, further raising pressure on the show. In 2020 S&P Global attributed a decline in Fox News advertising revenue to the boycott.

On March 24, Never Again MSD was a lead organizer of March for Our Lives, a global student-led demonstration with some demands to change gun law in the United States. More than a million protestors attended more than 800 events around the world.

Hogg reported to his own social media which colleges had offered or declined admission to him. On March 27, 2018, TMZ published an article listing all these schools. The following day Fox News personality Laura Ingraham ridiculed Hogg, tweeting: "David Hogg Rejected By Four Colleges To Which He Applied and whines about it. (Dinged by UCLA with a 4.1 GPA...totally predictable given acceptance rates.)" Hogg responded with a tweet that listed her advertisers, and suggested those advertisers be boycotted.

== Impact ==
Within two days, fifteen companies had ceased advertising on Ingraham's show, including AT&T, Office Depot and TripAdvisor. Other companies such as Ace Hardware dropped the show in the ensuing days. A few days later, Allstate stopped advertising on Ingraham's show, circulating a memo to employees citing the company's values being at odds with Ingraham's comments.

Ingraham publicly apologized for her remark the day after her initial criticism, but Hogg rejected it as insincere, saying she had only apologized because advertisers had left her show, and that he would accept an apology in the future if she denounced the way her network treated him and his friends. Republican strategist Steve Schmidt speculated why Ingraham's advertisers pulled their support: "...this kid's not scared. He's not scared of the NRA. He's not intimidated and scared by Laura Ingraham."

Ingraham returned to her show in April after a pre-planned week-long Easter break, with the support of Rupert Murdoch. According to The Washington Post, the advertising time dropped by half following the spat, but there was speculation that it might "blow over" with some advertisers returning to the show after the interest died down. Fox News co-president Jack Abernethy said that the network "cannot and will not allow voices to be censored by agenda-driven intimidation efforts".

A total of 24 sponsors had stopped advertising on The Ingraham Angle by mid-April 2018. Polling by YouGov BrandIndex in the days following the announcement of the boycott showed that the Fox News brand had sustained significantly more consumer perception damage than any of the advertisers. The positive consumer perception of Ingraham dropped from 53 percent to 33 percent, according to the celebrity data and research firm Spotted. Rates for advertising during the show dropped after the start of the boycott. Prices for a 30-second spot dropped from an average range of $12,310-$14,732 to an average range of $11,305-$13,405, according to analysts. Advertising time during the show dropped by as much as 52 percent.

A 2020 review by S&P Global remarked that Ingraham's views continued to be a deterrent to advertisers and contribute to the decline in advertising revenue of parent Fox News. Forbes also reflected on the boycott in 2020, also noting that the show had recently averaged 4.3 million viewers, "its most watched week ever."

== List of advertisers in boycott and aftermath ==
Following Ingraham's comments about Hogg, the following sponsors made announcements that they would no longer advertise on The Ingraham Angle.

- Ace Hardware
- Allstate and Esurance
- Arby's
- AT&T Corporation
- Atlantis Paradise Island
- Bayer
- Blue Apron
- Entertainment Studios
- Expedia
- Honda
- Hulu
- IBM
- Jenny Craig
- Johnson & Johnson
- JoS. A. Bank
- Liberty Mutual
- Miracle-Ear
- Mitsubishi Motors
- Nestlé
- Nutrish
- Office Depot
- Principal Financial Group
- Rocket Mortgage
- Ruby Tuesday
- Sleep Number
- Slim Fast
- Stitch Fix
- TripAdvisor
- Wayfair

In the months that followed, Bayer and Jenny Craig returned to The Ingraham Angle as advertisers. In 2019, Google purchased a large block of time on the show.

Other advertisers joining the show included ADT, NordicTrack, Freshpet, Sanofi, Sandals Resorts, Tivity Health, WeatherTech, Omaha Steaks, and Vantage Hospitality. A year after the boycott, Fox Corporation president of ad sales Marianne Gambelli said, "'The Ingraham Angle' has seen a steady increase in advertisers, and as predicted, we are nearing a full commercial load. The program's loyal audience and stellar ratings speak for themselves and we continue to welcome more advertisers to the show."

== Reactions ==
At the end of her Friday, March 30 show, Ingraham announced she was taking a week-long absence from the show for Easter. This week-long break was already planned in advance prior to the controversy and advertiser loss, according to Ingraham and Fox News.

My Pillow creator Mike Lindell became a target of the boycott, refusing to join the other advertisers in pulling out of The Ingraham Angle.

Fox News, Ingraham's media organization, responded to the boycott, stating, "We cannot and will not allow voices to be censored by agenda-driven intimidation efforts".

According to Hamilton 68, hundreds of Russian bots came to Ingraham's defense on Twitter during the weekend following the boycott. Posts under the hashtag #IStandWithLaura jumped 2800 percent, which was the top trending hashtag for Russian Twitter accounts.

Talk show host Bill Maher came to the defense of Ingraham, saying that the boycott was wrong, and that her show should be continued on the grounds of advocating free speech, and saying that he, himself, had been the victim of a boycott, and he felt that he had been unfairly treated in the past.
