= Mike Lindell =

American businessman and political activist (born 1961)

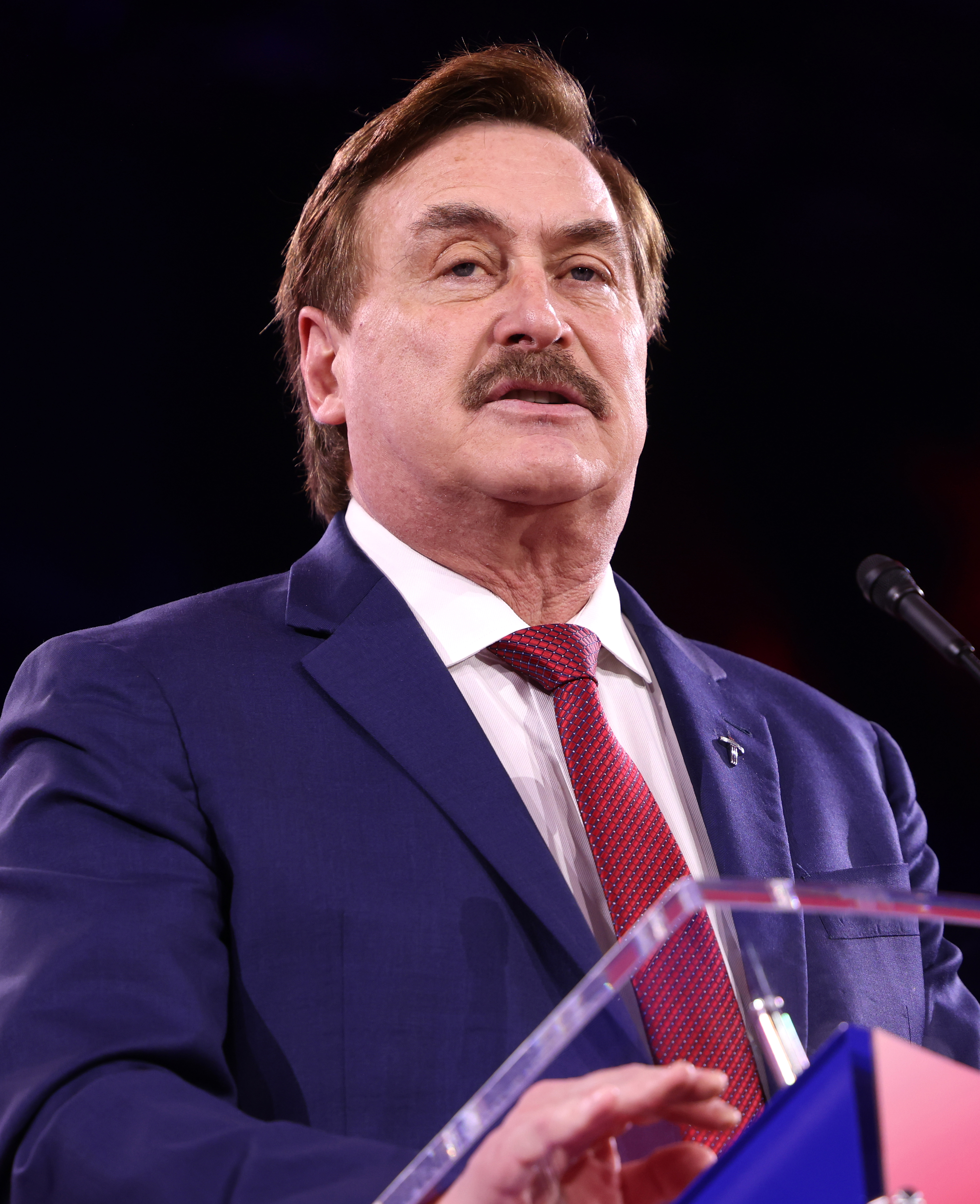
- Lindell in 2025
- Born: Michael James Lindell; June 28, 1961 (age 65); Mankato, Minnesota, U.S.
- Other names: My Pillow Guy; Mike Pillow
- Education: University of Minnesota (attended)
- Political party: Republican
- Spouses: Karen Dickey (divorced); Dallas Yocum (m. 2013; div. 2013); Kendra (m. 2024)
- Children: 4
- Website: Official website

Michael James Lindell (/lɪnˈdɛl/ lin-DEL; born June 28, 1961), also known as the My Pillow Guy and Mike Pillow, is an American businessman, political activist, and conspiracy theorist. He is the founder and former CEO of My Pillow, a pillow, bedding, and slipper manufacturing company.

Lindell is a prominent supporter of and advisor to U.S. President Donald Trump. After Trump's defeat in the 2020 U.S. presidential election, Lindell played a significant role in supporting and financing Trump's attempts to overturn the election result, and spread disproven conspiracy theories about widespread electoral fraud in that election. He has also promoted unproven medical treatments for COVID-19.

In December 2025, Lindell announced that he would seek the Republican nomination for governor of Minnesota in the 2026 Minnesota gubernatorial election and received public support from Trump. On August 4, 2026, Lindell announced he would step down as MyPillow CEO to shift his focus on his run for governor; on August 11, 2026, Lindell lost the Republican primary to Lisa Demuth.

== Background ==
Lindell was born on June 28, 1961, in Mankato, Minnesota. He was raised in Chaska and Carver, Minnesota. Lindell says he began to develop a gambling addiction in his teenage years. He attended the University of Minnesota after high school in 1979, but dropped out a few months into his studies. Lindell became addicted to and a frequent user of cocaine in his 20s. This addiction became worse after he switched to crack cocaine in the 1990s. Lindell was also incurring gambling debts. The buildup of his addictions between the 1980s and 1990s led to the foreclosure of his house and his wife filing for divorce. Lindell said that he achieved sobriety through prayer in 2009.

== Career ==
In the 1980s, Lindell launched and operated a number of small businesses, including carpet cleaning, lunch wagons, and a few bars and restaurants in Carver County, Minnesota.

=== My Pillow ===
Lindell invented My Pillow, a pillow filled with pieces of shredded foam that interlock, in 2004. Lindell grew the business into a Minnesota manufacturing company.

The Better Business Bureau (BBB) revoked accreditation of My Pillow in 2017, lowering its rating to an F based on a pattern of complaints by consumers. The BBB cited a buy one, get one free offer that became a continuous offer and therefore the normal price of the product, not a sale price or free offer. Lindell said, "Naturally, I am terribly disappointed by the BBB's decision."

Lindell named his son Darren as the company's chief operating officer in 2020, citing his own possible future political ambitions.

Some major retailers stopped carrying My Pillow products in 2021. Lindell suggested this was a result of his claims relating to the 2020 United States presidential election results, although outlets like Kohl's and Bed Bath & Beyond have said it was due to market research and low customer demand. In July 2023, MyPillow had auctioned off equipment and subleased some of their manufacturing space after more retailers, including Walmart and Slumberland Furniture, stopped retailing My Pillow products.

In September 2024, Lindell faced controversy when MyPillow announced a sale of their classic pillow for a price of $14.88, which critics have noted is a common Nazi dog whistle combining references to the Fourteen Words and a Nazi chant. Numerous white supremacist accounts praised MyPillow and Mike Lindell in response. Lindell has denied that there was any hidden meaning behind the price.

=== Media enterprises ===
LindellTV.com
- Company type: Private
- Website type: Video streaming
- Available in: English
- Traded as: OTCID Basic: MLMC
- Founder: Mike Lindell
- Industry: Internet
- Website: lindelltv.com

Lindell operates two web sites under Mike Lindell Media Corporation: LindellTV.com, formerly Frank or FrankSpeech), focused on video streaming, and the social network Vocl.com, formerly FrankSocial.

Lindell detailed plans for Vocl, an alt-tech social media platform that he had been developing for several months, in March 2021. He described the site as a cross between YouTube and Twitter that would be different from Gab and Parler. A dispute from a company that owned a web site called Vocal led Lindell to rename his site Frank. Frank launched on the domain frankspeech.com on April 19, 2021, experiencing many technical issues, which Lindell ascribed to a "massive attack". Frank has no social networking features and primarily offers embedded video streams, including Absolute Interference, a two-hour video promoting conspiracy theories about the 2020 presidential election.

Lindell has said he has spent millions of dollars developing Frank. According to invoices published by a Salon writer, obtained from a leaked video conference with Lindell's IT team, Lindell spent about $936,000 on hardware, labor, and services to launch Frank. Jared Holt, an extremism and far-right media researcher at the Atlantic Council's Digital Forensic Research Lab, opined that Lindell was "being had by the people around him. ... All the various products and ventures Lindell has going on, whether it's a pseudo-documentary film or a social media platform, are very expensive endeavors. Someone is taking Lindell's money from him to produce this stuff." Lindell told Insider in March 2022 that he was spending over $1 million per month on Frank. FrankSpeech went public through a merger with a holding company two years later.

FrankSocial, a social networking site hosted on a different domain, became available in April 2022. A reporter for Insider described FrankSocial as reminiscent of Facebook's design in 2012, with a basic news feed and no messaging function. Lindell had 308 followers there as of April 21, 2022, more than any other user.

Effective April 23, 2025, Lindell's media company changed its name from FrankSpeech Network, Inc., to Mike Lindell Media Corp., and it changed its OTC Pink stock ticker symbol from FSBN to MLMC.

== Philanthropy ==
During the early days of My Pillow, Lindell made donations to the Salvation Army and Union Gospel Mission.

Lindell founded the Lindell Foundation, a non-profit organization that assists former addicts in getting treatment and other services. The foundation broadened over time, including cancer victims and veterans in their outreach.

In 2019, Lindell launched the Lindell Recovery Network, which connects addicts with others who have gone through drug addiction and the recovery process, as well as faith-based treatment centers and other recovery organizations.

== Political activities ==
Lindell met with Republican presidential candidate Donald Trump in August 2016 and became an avid supporter. He called Trump "the most amazing president this country has ever seen in history" after his 2016 election victory. In a speech at Liberty University in August 2019, Lindell said, "When I met with Donald Trump, it felt like a divine appointment, and when I walked out of that office I decided I was going to go all in."

Lindell attended the final presidential debate in Las Vegas on October 19, 2016. He spoke at a Trump campaign rally in Minneapolis on November 6, 2016, and attended the Official Donald Watch Party on November 8. He attended Trump's inauguration and Trump gave him an inauguration lapel pin as a personal gift.

Lindell sat next to Trump at an industry roundtable event at the White House in 2017.

Trump complimented Lindell for his "business acumen" at a rally in Fargo, North Dakota, on June 27, 2018. Lindell spoke at a Trump rally on October 4, 2018, in Rochester, Minnesota. Lindell delivered a speech at the 2019 Conservative Political Action Conference, in which he said that Trump was "the greatest president in history" and had been "chosen by God".

Lindell met with Trump and a Trump staffer to discuss opioid addiction in 2019. Lindell was present when Trump signed a bipartisan bill that addressed the growing opioid crisis and attempted to prevent opioid abuse and deadly overdoses.

In a March 2020 appearance on Fox News, Lindell said that his company's bedding factories had been refocused on face mask production at the behest of the Trump administration. Later that month, Lindell appeared with Trump at a White House coronavirus press conference, at which Lindell praised Trump: "God gave us grace on November 8, 2016, to change the course we were on. God had been taken out of our schools and lives, a nation had turned its back on God. I encourage you to use this time at home to get back in the word. Read our Bible and spend time with our families."

Lindell had considered running for governor of Minnesota in 2022 against Democratic incumbent Tim Walz, reportedly at Trump's urging. He attended a Republican Governors Association meeting, at which he was encouraged to run. He became the campaign chair for Trump's reelection campaign in Minnesota in May 2020. Lindell said he was "99% sure" about running for Minnesota governor in July 2020 but ultimately neither ran nor provided an explanation (though he had previously said his decision would depend on the results of the 2020 presidential election and "if we flip Minnesota red").

In November 2020, Lindell was among those who contributed toward paying the bail of the Kenosha shooter Kyle Rittenhouse. Lindell later said that he had donated to "The Fight Back Foundation Inc. to help fund election fraud litigation, among other things" and that reports that he had paid $50,000 for Rittenhouse's bail were "fake news".

In April 2022, Lindell's mention of his donating as much as $800,000 to a legal defense fund for Tina Peters, then a Republican candidate for Colorado Secretary of State, raised questions as such a donation would violate Colorado state law; the state's ethics commission investigated the fund after a complaint about a lack of donor transparency.

Lindell rejoined Twitter in May 2022, circumventing a Twitter ban on his former account. Hours after rejoining, however, Twitter terminated Lindell's newest account for ban evasion. In December 2022, his account was reinstated after Elon Musk acquired Twitter.

Lindell announced that he was running for Chair of the Republican National Committee in November 2022. On January 27, 2023, he lost after receiving four of the 167 votes cast.

=== 2026 gubernatorial campaign ===
On December 3, 2025, Lindell filed required paperwork to allow him to run in the 2026 Minnesota gubernatorial election. Lindell announced his intention to run on December 11, 2025. Later that month, he received public support from Donald Trump.

On August 11, 2026, Lindell lost the Republican primary to Lisa Demuth by about 11 percentage points. Lindell refused to concede and questioned the legitimacy of the results without evidence. Demuth had also won an informal Republican caucus straw poll in February, in which Lindell placed third.

=== Promotion of unproven medical treatments ===
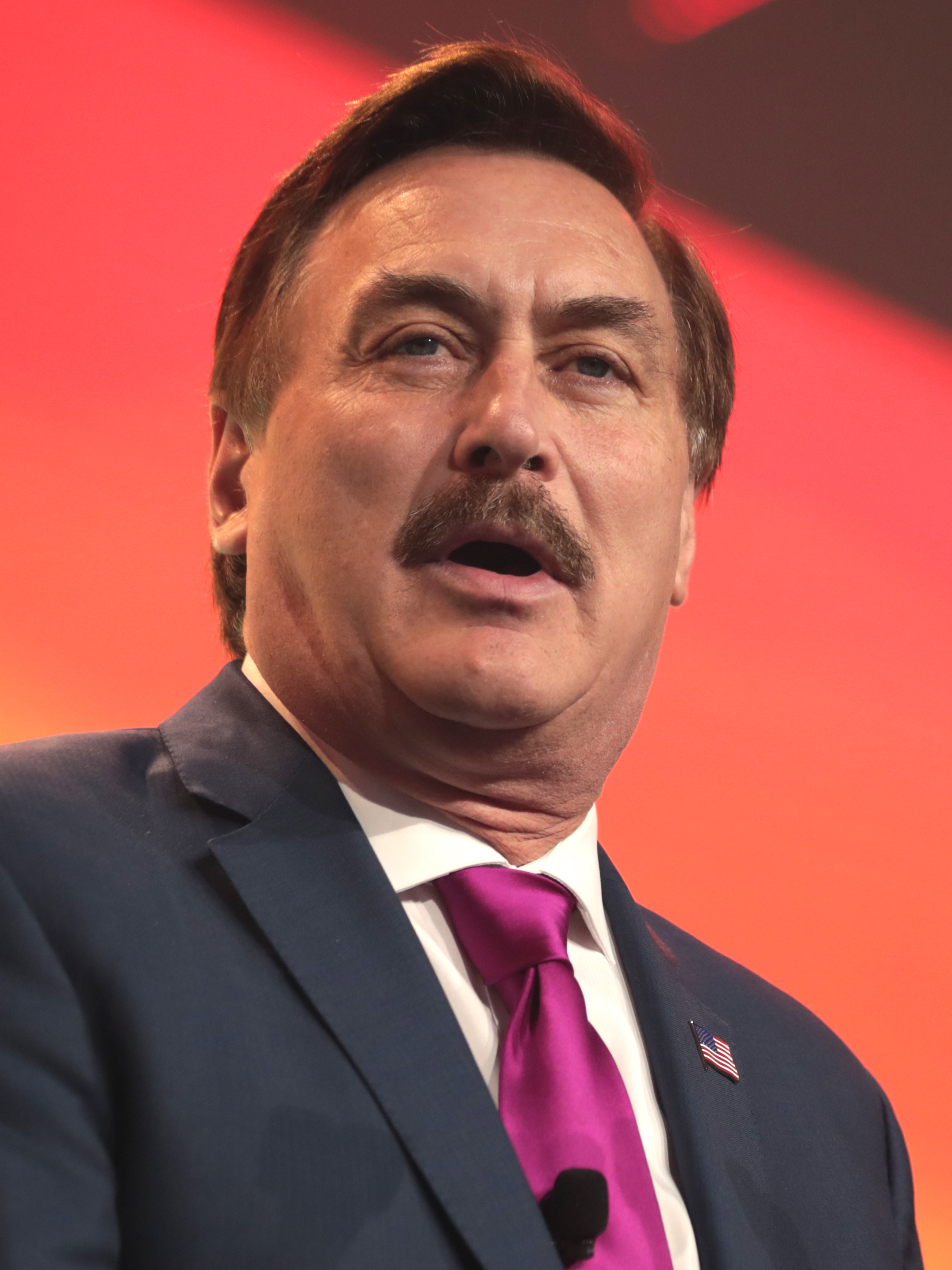
Lindell in December 2020

In 2020, Lindell promoted the use of oleandrin, a cardiotoxic substance produced by oleanders, as a treatment for COVID-19, including arranging a pitch meeting between then-President Donald Trump and Andrew Whitney, a fellow board member of biopharmaceuticals company Phoenix Biotechnology (in which Lindell has a financial stake). Lindell said that oleandrin was shown to be safe in a study when, in reality, there is no scientific evidence that oleandrin is a safe or effective coronavirus treatment.

== Attempts to overturn 2020 presidential election ==
After Trump's defeat in the 2020 presidential election, Lindell played a significant role in supporting and financing Trump's attempts to overturn the election result.

=== 2020 bus tour and January 6 rally ===
Lindell helped sponsor a bus tour that sought to challenge the election results. The two-week tour ended in Washington, D.C., on December 14, 2020; Lindell spoke at five stops. Lindell said that "he did not help finance subsequent trips to promote the Jan. 6 rally," referring to the rally that was followed by the storming of the U.S. Capitol by a pro-Trump mob. Lindell attended this rally but did not go to the Capitol. Following the Capitol storming, Lindell was among those who advanced the false conspiracy theory that people associated with antifa were responsible for the attack, saying they had probably "dressed as Trump people". On January 15, 2021, Lindell carried a document into the West Wing of the White House; the document, as seen in an enhanced photo, appeared to refer to martial law, the Insurrection Act, and replacing Gina Haspel with Trump loyalist Kash Patel as the CIA director.

=== Twitter ban ===
On January 25, 2021, Twitter permanently banned Lindell for perpetuating the unsubstantiated claim that Trump won the 2020 election. A Twitter spokesperson explained that Lindell violated the company's civic integrity policy implemented in September 2020 to fight disinformation. After his personal account was banned, Lindell circumvented the ban by using the corporate My Pillow Twitter account to issue several tweets, including a call for Twitter CEO Jack Dorsey to "be found out" and "put in prison when all is revealed!" Following the tweets, Twitter permanently banned the My Pillow account for violating the platform's ban evasion policy.

=== Absolute Proof documentary ===
Lindell purchased three hours of airtime on One America News Network, which had also been threatened with legal action, to broadcast Absolute Proof, a documentary that makes false claims about the election, on February 5, 2021. OANN broadcast a lengthy disclaimer before the program saying the claims were Lindell's alone but that the 2020 election results "remain disputed and questioned by millions of Americans". YouTube removed the documentary that day for violating its policy against election disinformation. At the 41st Golden Raspberry Awards, which gives awards to the films judged the worst, Absolute Proof won the Golden Raspberry Awards for Worst Picture and Worst Actor for Lindell. On April 20, 2021, Lindell published a second documentary titled Absolute Interference, which also promoted debunked conspiracy theories about the election and criticized the news media and communism.

=== Voting machine conspiracy theory ===
Lindell promoted a conspiracy theory which falsely claimed that voting machine companies Smartmatic and Dominion conspired with foreign powers to rig voting machines to steal the election from Trump. In January and February 2021, Dominion warned Lindell that they planned to sue him, stating in their letter: "You have positioned yourself as a prominent leader of the ongoing misinformation campaign." (Both Smartmatic and Dominion sent similar letters to others as well.) After Newsmax had broadcast a "clarification" of its false reporting on voting machine fraud in response to a demand letter from Dominion, followed by a defamation suit from a company executive, Lindell appeared on the network on February 2, 2021, in an interview to discuss cancel culture but pivoted to repeating the false claims about rigged voting machines. Network anchor Bob Sellers tried to stop Lindell from making his claims; Sellers then read a disclaimer before walking off the set mid-interview.

In August 2023, Lindell said he would prevent voting fraud by flying drones with wireless sniffing devices attached near polling places to determine whether voting machines are connected to the Internet.

==== Dominion lawsuit ====
Dominion sent cease-and-desist letters to Lindell in December 2020 and January 2021 and asked him to retract his false claims about the company. After Lindell refused (saying "sue me"), Dominion filed suit for defamation on February 22, 2021, naming both Lindell and My Pillow as defendants and seeking US$1.3 billion in damages. In its complaint, Dominion alleged that Lindell and My Pillow used "defamatory marketing campaign—with promo codes like 'FightforTrump,' '45,' 'Proof,' and 'QAnon'—[which have] increased My Pillow sales by 30–40% and [continued] duping people into redirecting their election-lie outrage into pillow purchases"; Dominion further stated its intent was to "stop Lindell and My Pillow from further profiting at Dominion's expense". On August 11, a federal court judge ruled that Dominion's defamation lawsuit against Lindell and My Pillow could proceed, noting that Dominion has "adequately alleged" that Lindell's accusations against the company were either knowingly false or made with "reckless disregard for the truth".

On June 16, 2025, a federal jury in Colorado found Lindell liable for defamation against Eric Coomer, the former security and product strategy director at Denver-based Dominion Voting Systems, whom Lindell called a traitor. The jury ordered Lindell and FrankSpeech to pay Coomer $2.3 million in damages. In July 2025, attorneys representing Lindell were fined $6,000 after it was found that the filed brief contained AI hallucinations of misquotes and citations to fictional cases.

On July 1, 2026, Dominion Voting Systems, now known as Liberty Vote, ended their multi-billion defamation lawsuit against Mike Lindell. The court filing agreed that "each party shall bear its own attorneys' fees, expenses, and costs".

==== Smartmatic lawsuit ====
In January 2022, Smartmatic sued Lindell for defamation and sought unspecified damages and legal fees; his false claims had reduced the company's value from more than $3 billion before the 2020 election to less than $1 billion. On September 26, 2025, U.S. District Judge Jeffrey Bryan ruled that Lindell had defamed Smartmatic with 51 false claims. However, Bryan said that Smartmatic would still have to prove, via further proceedings, that Lindell had acted with actual malice before it could collect damages.

==== Lindell's counter-lawsuits ====
In March 2021, Lindell said on Steve Bannon's War Room: Pandemic podcast that he would counter-sue Dominion in cases for himself and My Pillow, accusing Dominion of racketeering and election interference.

- My Pillow filed a $1.6 billion lawsuit against Dominion, arguing that Dominion had defamed the company; Lindell announced the lawsuit on April 19, 2021. Stephen Shackelford, legal counsel for Dominion, said that My Pillow's lawsuit was "a meritless retaliatory lawsuit, filed by My Pillow to try to distract from the harm it caused to Dominion".
- Lindell sued Dominion and Smartmatic in June 2021; the day after, the lawyer who drafted and filed the suit for him left the law firm Barnes & Thornburg where he had been a partner. The firm said he had not received permission to participate in the lawsuit.

In May 2022, the federal court dismissed all the claims by Lindell and MyPillow against Dominion, Smartmatic, and their lawyers and public relations firm. The court also ruled that Lindell and MyPillow would be liable to Smartmatic for attorney's fees, in an amount to be determined, for making claims that were frivolous under Rule 11.

=== Predictions of Trump's return to office ===
Lindell and others predicted various inquiries into the election would result in Trump being reinstated as president in 2021. Lindell predicted that Trump would be reinstated on the morning of August 13, stating "it'll be the talk of the world". After August 13 passed and President Joe Biden remained in office, Lindell moved his prediction for Trump's return to September 30, which also did not happen.

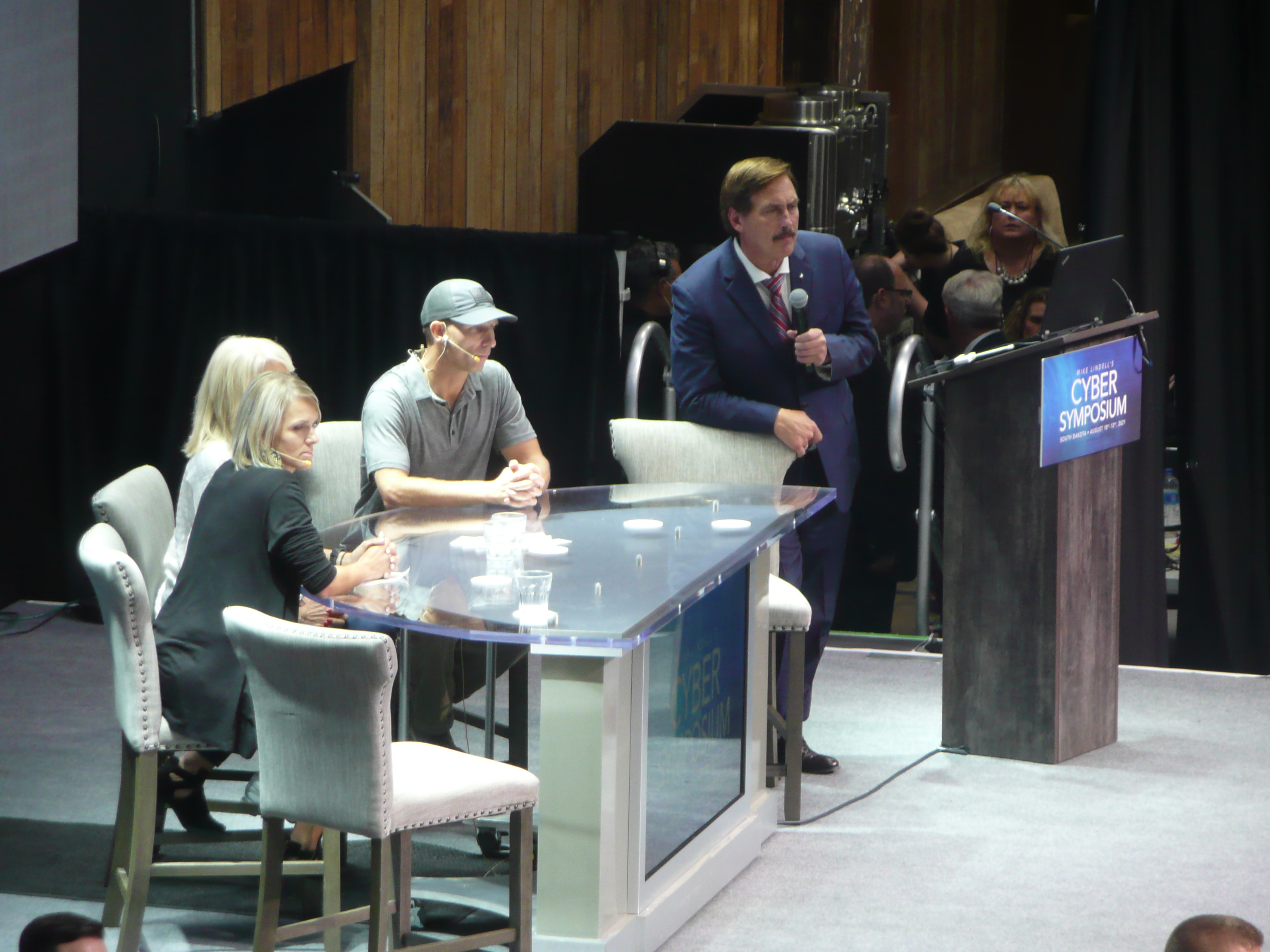
Lindell (standing) at his Cyber Symposium

=== Chinese interference conspiracy theory ===
Lindell held a three-day "Cyber Symposium" ending August 12, 2021, promising to present "irrefutable evidence" of election fraud, but none was produced. Reporter Donie O'Sullivan brought cybersecurity expert Harri Hursti to the conference, and Hursti said that Lindell's purported evidence was a "pile of nothing" and found no proof of election fraud.

In connection with the Cyber Symposion, Lindell claimed a certain dataset showed Chinese interference in the 2020 election, and offered $5 million to anyone who could prove otherwise. This challenge was taken up by Robert Zeidman, a software developer who has been described as a Trump supporter and who claims to have thought the data was probably authentic because Lindell would not have offered a reward otherwise. The rules provided for binding arbitration by the American Arbitration Association (AAA). Zeidman concluded the data was not authentic and on April 20, 2023, a panel of AAA's Commercial Arbitration Tribunal ordered Lindell to pay the $5 million. On February 21, 2024, the United States District Court of the District of Minnesota confirmed the arbitration award. On July 23, 2025, the three-judge 8th United States Court of Appeals universally ruled in favor of Lindell's bid to avoiding paying Zeidman the $5 million, finding that the arbitration panel had improperly interpreted the rules of the contest.

=== Bonner County, Idaho recount ===
In September 2021, Bonner County, Idaho, announced it would perform a recount of ballots cast in the 2020 presidential election, in response to an allegation by Lindell that all 44 Idaho counties had been digitally hacked. Lindell provided a detailed list of IP addresses he asserted had been compromised. County Clerk Mike Rosedale responded that all county voting machines were fully airgapped from the Internet, also noting that seven Idaho counties do not use voting machines. Lindell alleged that a specific formula had been applied by hackers to flip votes from Trump to Biden. Rosedale said Lindell had not contacted his office before presenting his allegations. Trump carried Bonner County with 67.2% of the vote and Idaho with 63.9% in the 2020 election. At the conclusion of the Idaho recount, accuracy was determined to be within 0.1% for the election results with no indications of digital hacking. Idaho plans to bill Lindell for the cost of the recount. The Bonner audit, and audits of two other counties that do not use voting machines, affirmed the accuracy of the ballot count. Chief Deputy Secretary of State Chad Houck said Lindell would be sent a bill for the audits.

=== FBI warrant for phone search ===
On September 13, 2022, the FBI served a search and seizure warrant for Lindell's phone. As recounted by Lindell, speaking on his web show, agents surrounded his car at a fast-food drive-through in Minnesota. In addition to sharing the search warrant on his show, Lindell claims FBI agents asked questions regarding Colorado's Mesa County Clerk Tina Peters, who was charged with election interference earlier that month. Peters was later convicted of multiple charges and sentenced to nine years in prison.

=== Legal debt ===
Lindell's legal firm said in an October 2023 court filing that Lindell was in arrears by millions of dollars in fees and that the firm could no longer afford to represent him. Lindell told reporters for NBC News, "We've lost everything, every dime. All of it is gone."

=== Other false claims ===
In January 2022, Lindell said that he possessed "enough evidence to put everybody in prison for life, 300-some million people" for their part in the alleged 2020 election fraud, which, at the time, was about 91 percent of the U.S. population.

Lindell attended the 2024 Democratic National Convention in disguise, where he falsely claimed that there were 257,000 votes missing from the 2020 election.

== Personal life ==
Lindell has been married three times. His first marriage ended in divorce after about 20 years, and he has children from this marriage. He married Dallas Yocum in June 2013 and filed for divorce in mid-July 2013 after she left him. Lindell said that they had a prenuptial agreement. Lindell's third marriage to Kendra was made public by Donald Trump at a rally on April 6, 2024.

Lindell is an evangelical Christian and received an honorary Doctor of Business from Liberty University in 2019. In bestowing the honor, Dave Brat, the dean of Liberty University's School of Business, called Lindell "one of the greatest Christian businessmen on the planet." The event featured Lindell's donation of 12,000 pillows which the university's news service said were worth over $600,000 to those in attendance. That same year, Lindell self-published a book, What Are the Odds? From Crack Addict to CEO, in which he recounts his overnight recovery from drug addiction and credits divine intervention for the subsequent launch of his pillow business.

In January 2021, the Daily Mail published a story stating that Lindell had a nine-month relationship with actress Jane Krakowski between late 2019 and the summer of 2020. Both Lindell and Krakowski denied the allegation. Lindell, represented by attorney Charles Harder, sued the Daily Mail, alleging libel. A federal court dismissed the suit in December 2021, ruling that Lindell had failed to identify any statements "that a reasonable person would view as defamatory."

In March 2021, Lindell said on The Domenick Nati Show that he was no longer living in Minnesota and was not attending in-person events over safety concerns. In September 2025, Lindell said he had again made Minnesota his home.
