= Electoral history of Amy Klobuchar =

List of elections featuring Minnesota politician

This is the electoral history of Amy Klobuchar, who has served as a United States Senator from Minnesota since 2007. A member of the Minnesota Democratic–Farmer–Labor Party, she previously served as county attorney of Hennepin County, Minnesota, and is currently the governor-elect of Minnesota.

== Hennepin County attorney elections ==
=== 1998 ===
1998 Hennepin County attorney election
Candidate	Votes	%
Amy Klobuchar	223,416	50.42
Sheryl Ramstad Hvass	219,676	49.58
Total votes	443,092	100.00

=== 2002 ===
2002 Hennepin County attorney election
Candidate	Votes	%
Amy Klobuchar (incumbent)	380,632	98.75
Write-in	4,829	1.25
Total votes	385,461	100.00

== United States Senate elections ==
=== 2006 ===
Democratic–Farmer–Labor primary
Party	Candidate	Votes	%
Democratic (DFL)	Amy Klobuchar	294,671	92.51
Democratic (DFL)	Darryl Stanton	23,872	7.49
Total votes		318,543	100.00

County results of the 2006 senatorial election

2006 United States Senate election in Minnesota
Party	Candidate	Votes	%	±%
Democratic (DFL)	Amy Klobuchar	1,278,849	58.06%	+9.23
Republican	Mark Kennedy	835,653	37.94%	−5.35
Independence	Robert Fitzgerald	71,194	3.23%	−2.58
Green	Michael Cavlan	10,714	0.49%	N/A
Constitution	Ben Powers	5,408	0.25%	+0.15
Write-in		954	0.04%	
Total votes		2,202,772	100.0%	
Democratic (DFL) hold				

=== 2012 ===
Democratic–Farmer–Labor primary
Party	Candidate	Votes	%
Democratic (DFL)	Amy Klobuchar (incumbent)	183,702	90.79
Democratic (DFL)	Dick Franson	6,832	3.38
Democratic (DFL)	Jack Shepard	6,638	3.28
Democratic (DFL)	Darryl Stanton	5,160	2.55
Total votes		202,332	100.00

County results of the 2012 senatorial election

2012 United States Senate election in Minnesota
Party	Candidate	Votes	%	±%
Democratic (DFL)	Amy Klobuchar (incumbent)	1,854,595	65.23%	+7.17
Republican	Kurt Bills	867,974	30.53%	−7.41
Independence	Stephen Williams	73,539	2.59%	−0.64
Grassroots	Tim Davis	30,531	1.07%	N/A
Independent	Michael Cavlan	13,986	0.49%	±0.00
Write-in		2,582	0.09%	
Total votes		2,843,207	100.0%	
Democratic (DFL) hold				

=== 2018 ===
Democratic–Farmer–Labor Party primary
Party	Candidate	Votes	%
Democratic (DFL)	Amy Klobuchar (incumbent)	557,306	95.70
Democratic (DFL)	Steve Carlson	9,934	1.71
Democratic (DFL)	Stephen Emery	7,047	1.21
Democratic (DFL)	David Groves	4,511	0.77
Democratic (DFL)	Leonard Richards	3,552	0.61
Total votes		582,350	100.00

County results of the 2018 senatorial election

2018 United States Senate election in Minnesota
Party	Candidate	Votes	%	±%
Democratic (DFL)	Amy Klobuchar (incumbent)	1,566,174	60.31%	−4.92
Republican	Jim Newberger	940,437	36.21%	+5.68
Legal Marijuana Now	Dennis Schuller	66,236	2.55%	N/A
Green	Paula Overby	23,101	0.89%	N/A
Write-in		931	0.04%	
Total votes		2,596,879	100.0%	
Democratic (DFL) hold				

=== 2024 ===
Democratic–Farmer–Labor primary results
Party	Candidate	Votes	%
Democratic (DFL)	Amy Klobuchar (incumbent)	305,055	94.29
Democratic (DFL)	Steve Carlson	9,535	2.95
Democratic (DFL)	Ahmad Hassan	4,891	1.51
Democratic (DFL)	Ole Savior	2,478	0.77
Democratic (DFL)	George Kalberer	1,578	0.49
Total votes		323,537	100.00

County results of the 2024 senatorial election

2024 United States Senate election in Minnesota
Party	Candidate	Votes	%	±%
Democratic (DFL)	Amy Klobuchar (incumbent)	1,792,441	56.20%	−4.11
Republican	Royce White	1,291,712	40.50%	+4.29
Libertarian	Rebecca Whiting	55,215	1.73%	N/A
Independence	Joyce Lacey	46,377	1.45%	N/A
Write-in		3,578	0.11%	
Total votes		3,189,323	100.0%	
Democratic (DFL) hold				

== Presidential campaign ==
Klobuchar launched her presidential campaign on February 10, 2019. In the contests prior to Super Tuesday, she accumulated seven pledged delegates, six of whom came from the New Hampshire primary, in which she earned 19.7% of the vote.

Following poor showings in the South Carolina primary, Klobuchar suspended her campaign on March 2, 2020, and endorsed former vice president Joe Biden for the nomination. Due to the timing of her withdrawal, she would remain on the ballots of 40 primaries and caucuses in total. She notably drew 5.6% of the vote in her home state of Minnesota on March 3, where early voting had already taken place.

2020 Democratic Party presidential primaries
Candidate	Votes	%
Joe Biden	19,076,052	51.79
Bernie Sanders	9,679,213	26.28
Elizabeth Warren	2,831,472	7.69
Michael Bloomberg	2,488,734	6.76
Pete Buttigieg	924,237	2.51
Amy Klobuchar	529,713	1.44
Tulsi Gabbard	273,940	0.74
Tom Steyer	259,792	0.71
Andrew Yang	170,517	0.46
Others	860,078	2.34
Total votes	36,833,956	100.00

== Governor of Minnesota election ==
=== 2026 ===
Democratic–Farmer–Labor primary
Party	Candidate	Votes	%
Democratic (DFL)	Amy Klobuchar	614,474	89.7
Democratic (DFL)	Kobey J. Layne	39,511	5.8
Democratic (DFL)	Mohammad Wazwaz	9,628	1.4
Democratic (DFL)	Po Vang	8,833	1.3
Democratic (DFL)	Ole Viking Savior	5,487	0.8
Democratic (DFL)	Thomas Evenstad	3,842	0.6
Democratic (DFL)	Bill Gates Jr.	3,376	0.5
Total votes		685,151	100.0

County results of the 2026 gubernatorial election

2026 Minnesota gubernatorial election
Party	Candidate	Votes	%	±%
Democratic (DFL)	Amy Klobuchar; Ben Schierer	1,569,756	55.47%	+3.20
Republican	Lisa Demuth; Ryan Wilson	1,206,574	42.63%	−1.98
Green	Steve Young; Jane Kirby	51,388	1.82%	N/A
Write-in		2,446	0.09%	N/A
Total votes		2,830,164	100.0%	
Democratic (DFL) hold				
