= Ben Schierer =

American politician (born 1973)

- Schierer in 2026

Lieutenant Governor-elect of Minnesota
- Assuming office January 4, 2027
- Governor: Amy Klobuchar (elect)
- Succeeding: Peggy Flanagan

Mayor of Fergus Falls
- In office 2017–2025
- Preceded by: Hal Leland
- Succeeded by: Anthony Hicks

Personal details
- Born: September 30, 1973 (age 53) Fergus Falls, Minnesota, U.S.
- Party: Democratic (DFL)
- Spouse: Tessa
- Children: 5
- Education: Metropolitan State University (BA); University of Minnesota (MPA)

Ben Schierer (born September 30, 1973) is an American author, business owner, and politician from Minnesota who is the lieutenant governor-elect of Minnesota. A member of the Democratic-Farmer-Labor party, Schierer previously served as the mayor of Fergus Falls from 2017 to 2025, and as a member of the city council from 2005 to 2017.

== Biography ==
Schierer was born and raised in Fergus Falls, where he and his wife Tessa started a restaurant and brewery. They have five children.

Schierer co-wrote a biography on Governor Rudy Perpich titled Perpich: A Minnesota Original, which was published in 2025.

=== Career ===
Schierer was elected to the city council of Fergus Falls in 2004. He was elected to succeed Hal Leland as mayor of Fergus Falls in 2016, and won a second term in 2020. While mayor, the city built multiple riverfront projects, centered around the city's downtown. He was succeeded by Anthony Hicks on November 5, 2024.

In September 2025, Schierer announced that he would be a candidate for the DFL nomination for Minnesota State Auditor in the 2026 Minnesota State Auditor election. In May 2026, Amy Klobuchar, candidate for governor of Minnesota, selected Schierer as her running mate in the 2026 Minnesota gubernatorial election, and he withdrew from the Auditor race. Klobuchar and Schierer won the DFL primary in August 2026 and won the general election in November 2026. He is the first male candidate elected Minnesota lieutenant governor since Lou Wangberg in 1978.

Political offices
Preceded by Peggy Flanagan	Lieutenant Governor of Minnesota; Taking office 2027	Elect
Party political offices
Preceded by Peggy Flanagan	Democratic nominee for Lieutenant Governor of Minnesota; 2026	Most recent
