= My Pillow =

American pillow-manufacturing company based in Minnesota

My Pillow, Inc.
- Type: Private
- Industry: Pillows; mattress covers; slippers
- Founded: July 1, 2009; 17 years ago
- Founder: Mike Lindell
- Headquarters: Chaska, Minnesota, U.S.
- Number of employees: 1,300 (2023)
- Website: mypillow.com

My Pillow, Inc. (stylized as MyPillow) is an American pillow-manufacturing company based in Chaska, Minnesota. The company was founded in 2009 by Mike Lindell, who invented and patented My Pillow, an open-cell, poly-foam pillow design. From 2004 to 2009, My Pillows were sold through Lindell's Night Moves Minnesota, LLC, and have been sold through My Pillow, Inc. since 2009. My Pillow has sold over 41 million pillows, due mostly to TV infomercials. The company started with five employees in 2004 and had 1,300 employees by 2023.

My Pillow has sponsored conservative political activities. It has been fined and has settled multiple lawsuits related to misleading advertising, including a 2017 settlement in a class action lawsuit against their buy one, get one free promotions. The company made scientifically unsupported claims that its pillows could cure insomnia and ailments such as sleep apnea, fibromyalgia, and multiple sclerosis. In 2022, it was sued along with Lindell by election technology company Smartmatic for allegedly making false claims about Smartmatic voting machines in order to promote its products.

== History ==
=== Origin ===
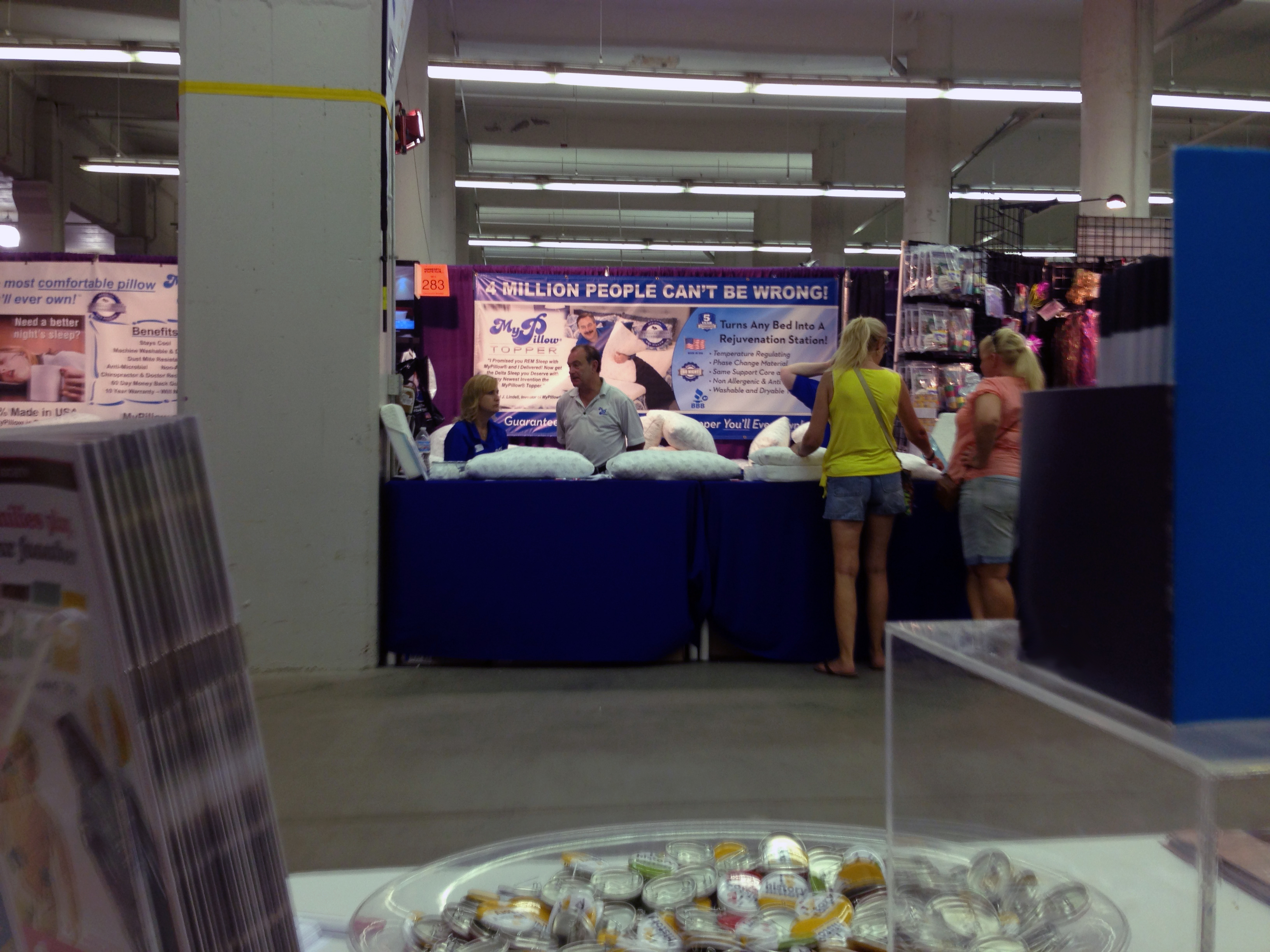
My Pillow booth at the Minnesota State Fair in 2014.

My Pillow was founded by Mike Lindell of Minnesota. To help fund the development of the pillow, Lindell sold four bars he owned in Carver County, Minnesota, and mortgaged his house. At first, Lindell hand-sewed the pillows himself and handled all the sales and distribution with help from his family.

The first My Pillow was sold in 2005 at a kiosk in Eden Prairie Center, a mall in Eden Prairie, Minnesota. For the next six years, the company struggled while selling at mall kiosks, state fairs, and trade shows.

=== Promotion ===
The company's success took off after an infomercial in October 2011. The 30-minute show was shot in one day in front of a live studio audience and cost $500,000 to produce and launch. As of September 2013, the infomercial was running an average of 200 times per day on local and national networks. Since it first aired, My Pillow has sold more than 30 million pillows and grown from 50 employees to over 1,500.

In July 2015, Lindell and My Pillow sponsored an attempt to set a new Guinness World Record for the world's largest pillow fight at a St. Paul Saints baseball game. The fight featured 6,261 participants, beating a previous record of 4,201.

In May 2018, Lindell and My Pillow again broke the Guinness World Record for the world's largest pillow fight, this time at the evangelistic PULSE Movement event held at the U.S. Bank Stadium, after Lindell led over 45,000 people in prayer.

In January 2024, Lindell said he typically bought an average of $1 million in ads per week on Fox and acknowledged that the network had reduced his credit from 12 weeks to eight weeks. He complained that Fox had recently cut him off at a $7.8 million debt and demanded payment from him, as he claimed this amount was within his credit line and that Fox was trying to silence him.

== Operations ==
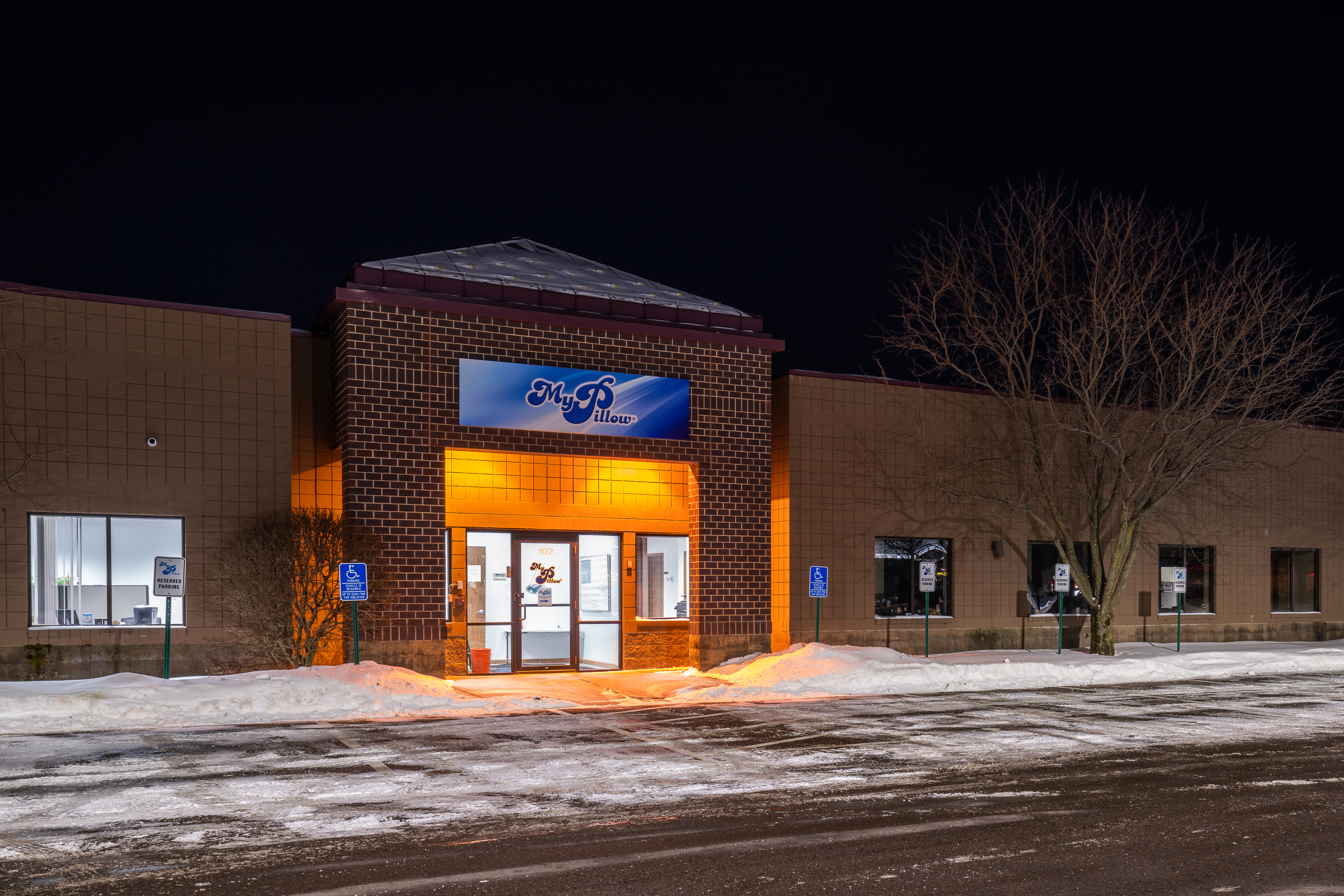
My Pillow's headquarters in Chaska, Minnesota

The company's headquarters, call center and customer service center are located in Chaska, Minnesota. My Pillow manufactures pillows, mattresses, mattress toppers and covers, Giza cotton sheets, towels and pet beds at its 70,000 square-foot manufacturing plant in Shakopee, producing approximately 25,000 pillows per day. Some products are marketed as "proudly American made".

=== Retail ===
My Pillow opened its first retail store in Burnsville, Minnesota, in 2012. My Pillow products are also offered on QVC, at major retailers, trade shows, and from the My Pillow website.

=== COVID-19 pandemic production shift ===
In March 2020, Fox affiliate KMSP-TV reported that founder Mike Lindell had announced that 75 percent of the company's production was shifting to making cotton face masks to donate to health care workers for use during the COVID-19 pandemic in the United States, and that "[m]asks will not be available to public to purchase".

== Design and technology ==
My Pillow products are a patented design involving a mix of different-sized pieces of open-cell poly-foam. Lindell says he tested 94 different foams before deciding on the right one. The pieces are chopped to specification by a machine Lindell developed based on a piece of farm equipment. The mix also contains a resin that enables the foam to retain much of its shape when molded to the user's preference. The pillows are non-allergenic, dust mite-resistant, washable, and dryable. In 2013, QVC awarded My Pillow its Q-Star Award for Product Concept of the Year.

== Controversies ==
=== Lawsuits and settlements ===
In April 2016, a class action lawsuit was proposed for the pillows being falsely advertised, among the complaints being that Lindell is marketed as a "Sleep Expert," despite having no board certification or special training in sleep medicine. The Better Business Bureau received 220 complaints regarding the company from 2013 to 2016.

In August 2016, the New York State Attorney General's office charged that My Pillow failed to collect and remit over $500,000 in sales tax. The company denied any wrongdoing but agreed to pay $1.1 million in settlement.

On November 1, 2016, My Pillow agreed to pay $1 million ($995,000 in civil penalties and $100,000 to California charities benefiting homeless persons and victims of domestic violence) to settle a false advertising lawsuit brought in Alameda County Superior Court by Alameda County and eight other California counties. The lawsuit challenged the company's marketing claims. This included claims without proof that its products could help people with fibromyalgia, restless leg syndrome and sleep apnea. In the past, the company had published testimonials claiming its products could ease symptoms of cerebral palsy, acid reflux and menopause. As part of the settlement, the company was banned "from making claims in California that its pillows can cure or treat diseases and their symptoms without a human trial to back up the statements." "In addition, My Pillow must stop promoting itself as the 'official pillow' of the National Sleep Foundation because it failed to disclose its financial connection with the foundation to consumers."

In November 2017, the lawsuit, which challenged the appropriateness of the marketing, packaging, and sale of My Pillow products, including health claims about the product, buy one get one promotions, and the use of third party endorsements and logos, was settled.

==== Dominion Voting Systems ====
In January 2021, Dominion Voting Systems threatened to sue Lindell over his false claims of widespread fraud involving their machines. Dominion eventually followed through on their threats and filed a $1.3 billion lawsuit against MyPillow and Lindell on February 22, 2021, with Dominion CEO John Poulos stating:

Despite repeated warnings and efforts to share the facts with him, Mr. Lindell has continued to maliciously spread false claims about Dominion, each time giving empty assurances that he would come forward with overwhelming proof. These claims have caused irreparable harm to Dominion's good reputation and threatened the safety of our employees and customers.

In April 2021, Lindell filed a countersuit against Dominion Voting Systems, accusing Dominion of "debasing the legal system".

Around the same time Dominion threatened legal action, Lindell said that retailers including Bed Bath & Beyond, Kohl's, Wayfair, and Texas supermarket chain H-E-B were removing My Pillow products from their stores. Representatives for Kohl's and Bed Bath & Beyond indicated that there was "decreased customer demand" for My Pillow products and that they were "underperforming".

=== Ratings and reviews ===
A 2016 Consumer Reports review of the company's pillows found a mixed reception after at-home testing, finding that "only one-third of the group said they would buy MyPillow again."

In January 2017, the Better Business Bureau (BBB) announced it had revoked the accreditation for My Pillow and had lowered its rating from an A+ to an F based on numerous consumer complaints. The main issue addressed by the BBB was the constant use of their buy one, get one free offer. The BBB's Code of Advertising requires that offers or discounts must be made for a limited time, or the deal becomes the normal price of the product. It remained an active promotion as of August 2020.

=== Other controversies ===
On September 20, 2024, MyPillow posted an advertisement on X (formerly Twitter) for a sale on their classic pillow. The sale price was $14.88, which critics have noted is a common Nazi dog whistle known as the Fourteen Words. Numerous white supremacist accounts praised MyPillow and Mike Lindell in response. Lindell has denied that there was any hidden meaning behind the price, calling it a media hit job.

== Philanthropy ==
A portion of My Pillow proceeds goes to the Lindell Foundation, a charity that assists addicts, veterans, cancer patients, and other people in need. In March 2015, My Pillow donated pillows to the Sandra J. Schulze American Cancer Society Hope Lodge, which houses patients and their caregivers when traveling for treatment. As of 2017, the company was donating a pillow to charities such as homeless shelters and hospitals for each order made in the associated Minnesota community. South Dakota, Nebraska, Minnesota, Arizona, Idaho, South Carolina, North Carolina, Montana and New York are some of the states to which the company has donated over 10,000 pillows. My Pillow donated 60,000 pillows in 2017 to Hurricane Harvey victims in Texas.

== Political activities ==
In late March 2018, student activists from the Stoneman Douglas High School shooting, including David Hogg, organized a boycott of The Ingraham Angle on Fox News after host Laura Ingraham made disparaging comments about Hogg. Dozens of advertisers subsequently vowed to no longer pay for advertising on The Ingraham Angle, but My Pillow continued to advertise on the show and increased their advertising buy on The Ingraham Angle by 625 percent during the first week in April 2018.

My Pillow purchased more advertising on the Fox News Tucker Carlson Tonight program than any other advertiser, as of June 2020, after many major companies had stopped supporting the show. A data firm estimated that nearly 38 percent of Carlson's 2020 advertising revenue had come from My Pillow at half-year.

My Pillow sponsors the conservative media group Right Side Broadcasting Network. It sponsored a two-week bus tour that ended on December 14, 2020, and was hosted by Amy Kremer to support Donald Trump's attempts to overturn the 2020 United States presidential election. Following the election, the firm's frequent product advertising on conservative media sometimes included discount codes of a political nature.

The My Pillow company Twitter account (@mypillowusa) was permanently suspended in February 2021 for violating Twitter's policy on ban evasion. After his personal account was banned for promoting election disinformation, Lindell used the company's Twitter account to post "Jack Dorsey is trying to cancel me (Mike Lindell) out!".

David Hogg said in February 2021 that he would launch an "ethical" competitor to MyPillow, a move described by The Daily Dot columnist David Covucci as "heating up" the "pillow wars". In April 2021, Hogg resigned from Good Pillow and released all his shares, ending his attempt to challenge MyPillow.
