= Lisa Demuth =

American politician (born 1967)

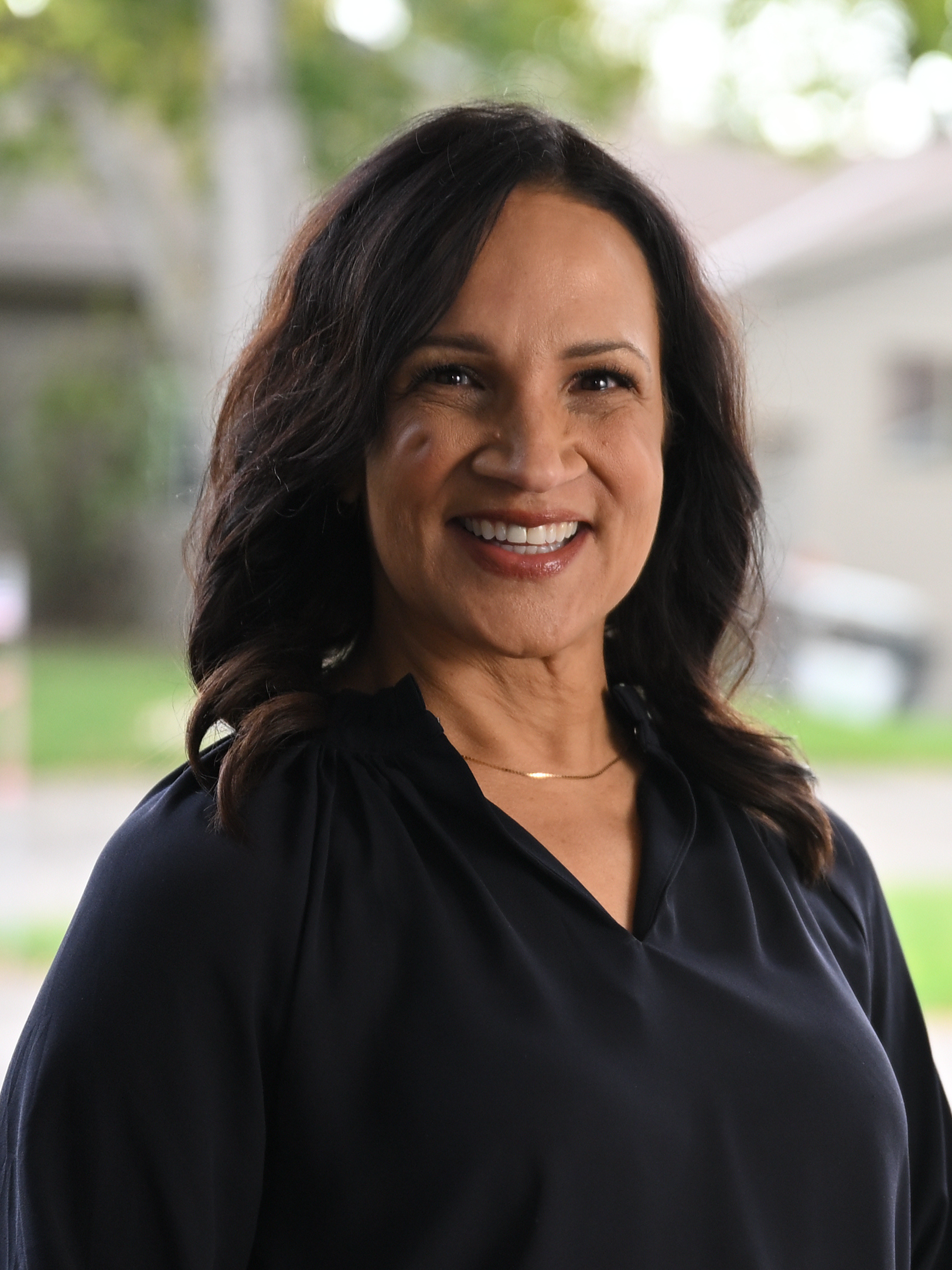
- Demuth in 2026

62nd Speaker of the Minnesota House of Representatives
- Incumbent
- Assumed office February 6, 2025
- Preceded by: Melissa Hortman

Minority Leader of the Minnesota House of Representatives
- In office January 3, 2023 – January 14, 2025
- Preceded by: Kurt Daudt
- Succeeded by: Melissa Hortman

Member of the Minnesota House of Representatives from the 13A district
- Incumbent
- Assumed office January 8, 2019
- Preceded by: Jeff Howe
- Succeeded by: Tanja Goering (elect)

Personal details
- Born: Lisa Marie Pittman; February 10, 1967 (age 59) Paynesville, Minnesota, U.S.
- Party: Republican
- Spouse: Nick Demuth (m. 1991)
- Children: 4
- Website: State house website Campaign website

Lisa Demuth (/ˈdeɪməθ/ DAY-məth; née Pittman, born February 10, 1967) is an American politician serving since 2025 as the speaker of the Minnesota House of Representatives. A member of the Republican Party of Minnesota, Demuth represents District 13A in central Minnesota, which includes the cities of St. Joseph and Cold Spring and parts of Stearns County. She has served since 2023 as leader of the House Republican caucus and from 2023 to 2025 as the minority leader of the Minnesota House of Representatives.

In January 2025, House Republicans voted to elect Demuth Speaker of the House. The Minnesota Supreme Court ruled that a quorum had not been present, invalidating Demuth's election. On February 5, 2025, the two major parties reached an agreement to end a Democratic–Farmer–Labor Party boycott of the legislative session; the agreement provided that Demuth would become speaker of the House. She was elected to the role on February 6, becoming the first Black person to become speaker of the Minnesota House of Representatives.

On August 11, 2026, Demuth won the Republican nomination for governor of Minnesota. On November 3, she lost the general election to Democratic nominee Amy Klobuchar.

== Early life, education, and career ==
Demuth was born Lisa Marie Pittman in Paynesville, Minnesota. She was raised by her mother and stepfather, an immigrant from Panama. Demuth graduated from Bloomington Kennedy High School. She is biracial: her father is Black, and her mother is White. Demuth experienced racism during her childhood, leading her family to move to the more diverse Twin Cities. She was elected to the Rocori school board as a write-in candidate in 2007 and reelected twice.

== Minnesota House of Representatives ==
Demuth was first elected to the Minnesota House of Representatives in 2018. She was recruited to run by the former representative for 13A, Jeff Howe, who was stepping down to run for the Minnesota Senate. During the 2021-22 legislative session, Demuth served as an assistant minority leader in the House. She opposes abortion and supported fetal heartbeat legislation in the Minnesota House.

After the 2022 Minnesota House of Representatives Election saw Republicans fail to flip the House from Democratic control, the Republican caucus elected Demuth minority leader. She has portrayed herself as more collaborative and calmer than her predecessor, Kurt Daudt. According to the American Conservative Union's scorecard, Demuth was ranked as less conservative than the average Republican legislator.

Demuth is the first African American and first biracial person to serve as minority leader of the Minnesota House of Representatives and the House Republican caucus. According to Demuth, she asked fellow legislators to pick her based on her qualifications, not her race. Her legislative colleagues have called her a "thoughtful legislator who listens well" but is not a policy wonk.

=== 2025 speaker dispute ===
In the opening session of the 94th Minnesota Legislature on January 14, 2025, only the 67 elected House Republicans attended. The 66 elected DFL members were absent in an effort to prevent a quorum. Secretary of State Steve Simon presided over the chamber and left, ruling that there was no quorum. Republican members proceeded to elect Demuth as Speaker of the House and continued with normal legislative business for two weeks with Demuth presiding. On January 24, the Minnesota Supreme Court ruled that because of the absence of a quorum, Demuth's election and all action that followed were invalid. On February 5, 2025, the two parties reached an agreement to end the DFL boycott of the legislative session that included making Demuth speaker.

== 2026 Minnesota gubernatorial campaign ==
In November 2025, Demuth announced her candidacy for the Republican nomination for the 2026 Minnesota gubernatorial election and selected attorney Ryan Wilson as her running mate. Demuth's campaign gained attention for its PAC's acceptance of $1.1 million in donations from billionaire Richard Uihlein, who owns the shipping business Uline.

== Political positions ==
=== Administration ===
During her 2026 gubernatorial campaign, Demuth advocated the creation of a nonpartisan "Office of Inspector General", which would investigate fraud in Minnesota government agencies. This was a response to the 2020s Minnesota fraud scandals. In early 2025, Demuth introduced bill HF1 with other Republican leaders. As of May 2026, an updated bipartisan bill was approved by the Minnesota House of Representatives.

In the 2026 Minnesota Public Radio voter guide, Demuth said Minnesota had endured "16 years of failed Democrat leadership in the executive branch".

=== Economy ===
Demuth has expressed interest in growing Iron Range mining operations and reducing permitting timelines.

=== Education ===
Citing the decline in Minnesota education ratings in the latest Annie E. Casey Foundation state rankings, Demuth has said she would refocus schools on core subjects like reading, math, writing, and science. She also supports a federal scholarship tax credit program, arguing that it will expand educational opportunities for struggling students. In 2025, she sponsored a state bill that would have created an Education Savings Account (ESA) program that allowed eligible students from low-income households to receive state funding for educational expenses. She opposes "woke gender and racial ideology" in schools, and wants to raise Minnesota's reading proficiency rates.

=== Energy ===
Demuth wants to repeal Minnesota's ban on nuclear energy.

=== Foreign affairs ===
During her 2026 gubernatorial campaign, Demuth advocated decreasing reliance on China and Russia for precious metal needs.

=== Public safety ===
Demuth has advocated for tougher sentences for recidivists.

=== Taxation and social welfare ===
Demuth wants to reduce income tax for low-income tax brackets, decrease car tab fees, and end taxes on social security. She supports implementing an optional local sales tax to help reduce property taxes.

=== Voting rights ===
Demuth is a proponent of voter identification laws.

== Electoral history ==
2018 Election for Minnesota State Representative District 13A
Party	Candidate	Votes	%	±%
Republican	Lisa Demuth	11,348	61.01%	
Democratic (DFL)	Jim Read	7,243	38.94%	

2020 Election for Minnesota State Representative District 13A
Party	Candidate	Votes	%	±%
Republican	Lisa Demuth	16,056	70.75%	
Democratic (DFL)	Katy Westlund	6,610	29.13%	

2022 Election for Minnesota State Representative District 13A
Party	Candidate	Votes	%	±%
Republican	Lisa Demuth	15,190	74.01%	
Democratic (DFL)	Andrea Robinson	5,324	25.94%	

== Personal life ==
In 1985, at age 18, she married and moved to Joliet, Illinois, with her first husband. They divorced two years later. Demuth married Nick Demuth in 1991. They reside in Cold Spring, Minnesota, and have four children. All their children were on campus when a gunman killed two students in the 2003 Rocori High School shooting. Demuth co-owns and manages commercial property with her husband.

She is a member of an Assemblies of God Pentecostal congregation in Cold Spring and has described her faith as central to her life.

Minnesota House of Representatives
Preceded by Kurt Daudt	Minority Leader of the Minnesota House of Representatives; 2023–2025	Succeeded by Melissa Hortman
Political offices
Preceded by Melissa Hortman	Speaker of the Minnesota House of Representatives; 2025–present	Incumbent
Party political offices
Preceded by Scott Jensen	Republican nominee for Governor of Minnesota; 2026	Most recent
