= Buy one, get one free =

Sales technique

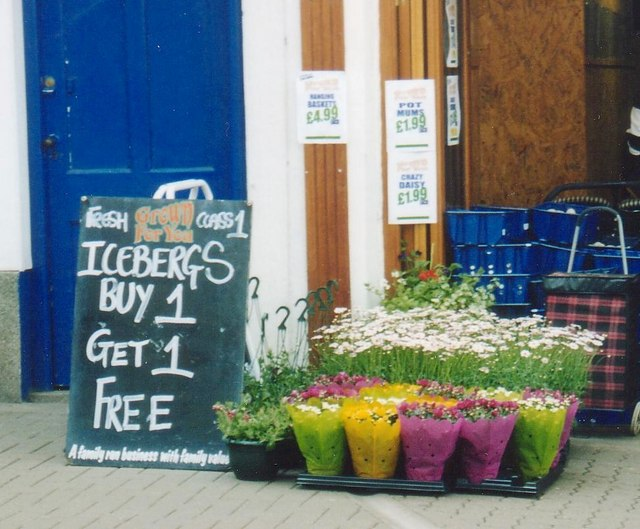
Sign board advertising a "buy one get one free" offer on flowers

"Buy one, get one free" or "two for the price of one" is a common form of sales promotion in which a second unit is sold for free only if the first unit is bought at full price.

== Marketing strategy ==
The economist Alex Tabarrok has argued, that the success of this promotion lies in the fact that consumers value the first unit significantly more than the second one. So compared to a seemingly equivalent "Half price off" promotion, they may only buy one item at half price, because the value they attach to the second unit is lower than even the discounted price.

== History ==
The concept of "buy one, get one free" was devised in the 18th century by retail entrepreneur Josiah Wedgwood. This technique is commonly known in the marketing industry by the acronym BOGOF, or simply BOGO.

== Criticism ==
Two-for-one promotions in the food industry have been criticized as contributing to food waste. Because many foods under such offers have short shelf lives, customers are more likely to pass the products' use by date.

Another criticism of BOGO deals is that, when combined with discounts, they deceptively encourage customers to buy more than they otherwise would, which can result in them spending more money.
