= 2026 United States Senate election in Minnesota =

- November 3, 2026
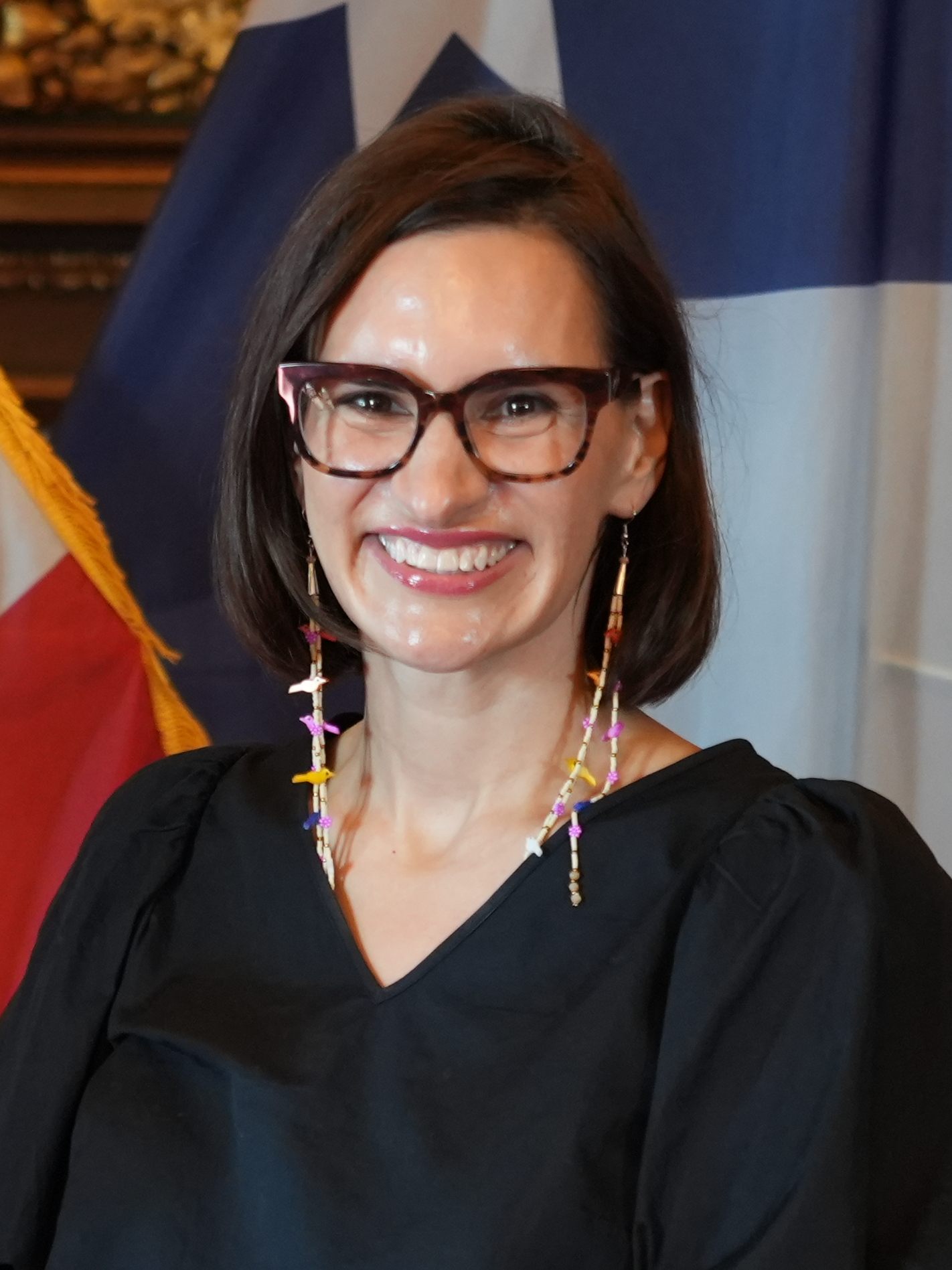

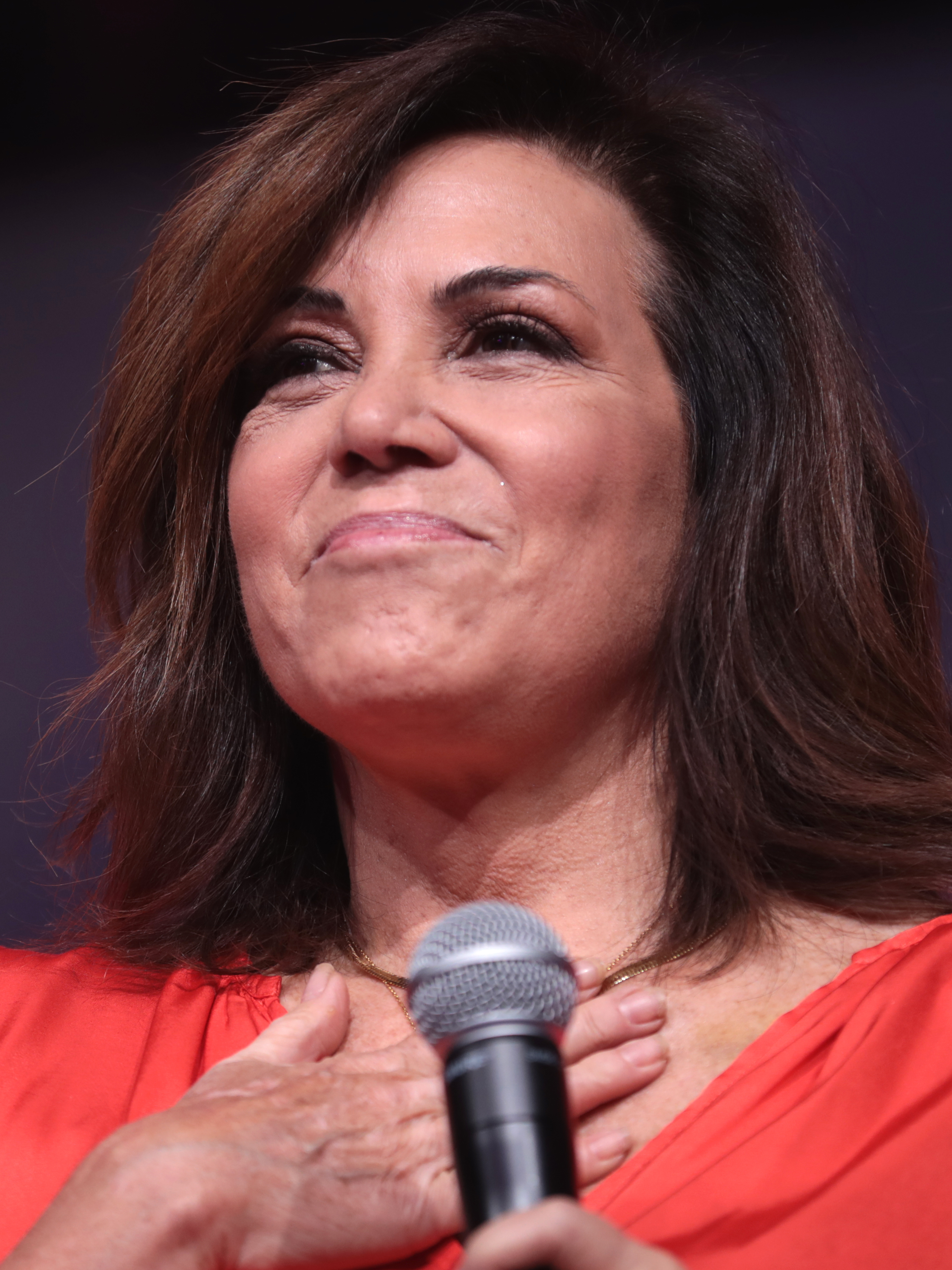
Nominee	Peggy Flanagan	Michele Tafoya
Party	Democratic (DFL)	Republican
Popular vote	1,520,871	1,233,467
Percentage	53.70%	43.56%
- Flanagan: 40–50% 50–60% 60–70% 70–80% 80–90% >90% Tafoya: 40–50% 50–60% 60–70% 70–80% 80–90% >90% Tie: 40–50% 50% No votes
U.S. senator before election
Tina Smith
Democratic (DFL)
Elected U.S. senator
Peggy Flanagan
Democratic (DFL)

The 2026 United States Senate election in Minnesota was held on November 3, 2026, to elect a member of the United States Senate to represent the state of Minnesota. Democratic lieutenant governor Peggy Flanagan defeated Republican former journalist Michele Tafoya. Democratic incumbent Tina Smith did not seek a second full term.

After Smith announced her retirement, Flanagan and Representative Angie Craig sought the Democratic nomination, which Flanagan won on August 11 with 59% of the vote. Tafoya won the Republican nomination with 52.1% of the vote over Navy SEAL Adam Schwarze and former basketball player Royce White.

== Democratic-Farmer-Labor primary ==
=== Background and campaign ===
Former Minnesota House Speaker Melissa Hortman was reportedly considering running for the seat before her assassination in June 2025.

The Democratic primary election between Flanagan and Craig was widely seen as a part of the national struggle between the Democratic Party's progressive and moderate factions since the 2024 U.S. elections, with endorsements split by ideology. Flanagan rejected accepting donations from corporate PACs or the pro-Israel lobby group AIPAC while Craig defended accepting them. Newsweek called the primary contest an "ideological proxy fight between Bernie Sanders-style progressivism and Bill Clinton-esque 'Third Way' centrism".

Craig reportedly had the private backing of the Democratic Senate leadership, including Chuck Schumer, Kirsten Gillibrand, and the Democratic Senatorial Campaign Committee (DSCC), but they did not endorse her.

Flanagan and Craig condemned the killing of Renée Good by an ICE agent amid Trump's mass deportation campaign. Flanagan said she supported a "complete and total overhaul" of ICE and criticized Craig for being "politically expedient" and voting for the Laken Riley Act and a resolution condemning the 2025 Boulder fire attack and expressing gratitude to ICE agents. Craig said she stood by her votes and that "Flanagan ... is twisting this and trying to create some sort of political advantage ... that is disgusting". Flanagan later expressed support for dismantling ICE and replacing it. Craig called that stance extreme and said it would push away independents.

On May 27, 2026, Craig announced her withdrawal from the Minnesota Democratic-Farmer-Labor Party's official endorsement process days before the statewide endorsing convention, saying it "does not reflect the full scope of the party...and the purple state." Craig was on the primary ballot without the party's endorsement. The change followed reporting on an influx of new participants at the state's senate district conventions who supported Flanagan in the backlash against ICE. The Flanagan campaign reported that it was on track to win the endorsement with the support of over 75% of delegates. Flanagan won the endorsement by acclamation at the convention on May 30.

On August 11, 2026, the Associated Press and NBC News called the race for Flanagan, who defeated Craig and others.

=== Candidates ===
==== Nominee ====
- Peggy Flanagan, lieutenant governor of Minnesota (2019–present)

==== Eliminated in primary ====
- Kurt M. Anderson, attorney
- Angie Craig, U.S. representative from Minnesota's 2nd congressional district (2019–present)
- George Kalberer, candidate for U.S. Senate in 2024 and Minnesota's 1st congressional district in 2022
- Peter J. Murgic
- Billy Nord, streaming company manager

==== Withdrawn ====
- Melisa López Franzen, minority leader of the Minnesota Senate (2021–2023) from the 49th district (2013–2023)

==== Declined ====
- Melvin Carter, former mayor of Saint Paul (2018–2026) (endorsed Flanagan)
- Keith Ellison, attorney general of Minnesota (2019–present) and U.S. representative from Minnesota's 5th congressional district (2007–2019) (running for reelection, endorsed Flanagan)
- Al Franken, former U.S. senator (2009–2018) (endorsed Flanagan)
- Jacob Frey, mayor of Minneapolis (2018–present) (endorsed Craig)
- Andrew M. Luger, former U.S. attorney for the district of Minnesota (2014–2017, 2022–2025)
- Kelly Morrison, U.S. representative from Minnesota's 3rd congressional district (2025–present) (running for reelection)
- Ilhan Omar, U.S. representative from Minnesota's 5th congressional district (2019–present) (running for reelection, endorsed Flanagan)
- Dean Phillips, former U.S. representative from Minnesota's 3rd congressional district (2019–2025) and candidate for president in 2024 (endorsed Craig)
- Steve Simon, Minnesota secretary of state (2015–present) (running for reelection)
- Tina Smith, incumbent U.S. senator (2018–present) (endorsed Flanagan)
- Tim Walz, governor of Minnesota (2019–present) and Democratic nominee for U.S. vice president in 2024 (ran for reelection, later withdrew)

=== Endorsements ===
Angie Craig

Executive branch officials

- Pete Buttigieg, former secretary of transportation (2021–2025)

U.S. senators

- Tammy Baldwin, Wisconsin (2013–present)
- Chris Coons, Delaware (2010–present)
- Catherine Cortez Masto, Nevada (2017–present)
- Ruben Gallego, Arizona (2025–present)
- Andy Kim, New Jersey (2024–present)
- Jacky Rosen, Nevada (2019–present)
- Elissa Slotkin, Michigan (2025–present)
- Debbie Stabenow, former Michigan (2001–2025)

U.S. representatives

- Hakeem Jeffries, House minority leader (2023–present) from NY-08 (2013–present)
- Sarah McBride, DE-AL (2025–present)
- Nancy Pelosi, former speaker of the House (2007–2011, 2019–2023) from CA-11 (1987–present)
- Collin Peterson, former MN-07 (1991–2021)
- Dean Phillips, former MN-03 (2019–2025)
- Mark Takano, CA-39 (2013–present)
- Ritchie Torres, NY-15 (2021–present)

Statewide officials

- Mikie Sherrill, governor of New Jersey (2026–present)
- Abigail Spanberger, governor of Virginia (2026–present)

State legislators

- ~~Dan Wolgamott, HD-14B (2019–present)~~ (later endorsed Flanagan)

Local officials

- Jacob Frey, mayor of Minneapolis (2018–present)
- Kaohly Her, mayor of St. Paul (2026–present)

Individuals

- Jim Obergefell, civil rights activist
- Gwen Walz, first lady of Minnesota (2019–present)

Labor unions

- American Federation of Government Employees
- Brotherhood of Locomotive Engineers and Trainmen Division 9
- IUPAT District Council 82
- Minnesota AFL-CIO Building and Construction Trades Council
- Minnesota Professional Fire Fighters
- Teamsters Joint Council 32

Organizations

- AIPAC
- Democratic Majority for Israel
- Elect Democratic Women
- Equality PAC
- Human Rights Campaign
- Joint Action Committee for Political Affairs
- LGBTQ+ Victory Fund
- LPAC
Peggy Flanagan

Executive branch officials

- Deb Haaland, former secretary of the interior (2021–2025) and 2026 New Mexico gubernatorial nominee

U.S. senators

- Al Franken, former Minnesota (2009–2018)
- Martin Heinrich, New Mexico (2013–present)
- Ed Markey, Massachusetts (2013–present)
- Jeff Merkley, Oregon (2009–present)
- Chris Murphy, Connecticut (2013–present)
- Bernie Sanders, Vermont (2007–present) (Independent)
- Tina Smith, Minnesota (2018–present)
- Chris Van Hollen, Maryland (2017–present)
- Elizabeth Warren, Massachusetts (2013–present)

U.S. representatives

- Adelita Grijalva, AZ-07 (2025–present)
- Pramila Jayapal, WA-07 (2017–present)
- Ro Khanna, CA-17 (2017–present)
- Betty McCollum, MN-04 (2001–present)
- Ilhan Omar, MN-05 (2019–present)
- Ayanna Pressley, MA-07 (2019–present)

Statewide officials

- Julie Blaha, state auditor of Minnesota (2019–present)
- Keith Ellison, attorney general of Minnesota (2019–present)

State legislators

- 5 state senators (Note: Liz Boldon, SD-25 (2023–present); Amanda Hemmingsen-Jaeger, SD-47 (2025–present); John Hoffman, SD-34 (2013–present); Lindsey Port, SD-55 (2021–present); Erin Maye Quade, SD-56 (2023–present))
- 13 state representatives (Note: Mary Frances Clardy, HD-53A (2023–present); Nathan Coulter, HD-51B (2023–present); Brion Curran, HD-36B (2023–present); Leigh Finke, HD-66A (2023–present); Cedrick Frazier, HD-43A (2021–present); Emma Greenman, HD-63B (2021–present); Jessica Hanson, HD-55A (2021–present); Athena Hollins, HD-66B (2021–present); Heather Keeler, HD-4A (2021–present); Larry Kraft, HD-46A (2023–present); Jamie Long, HD-61B (2019–present); Kristi Pursell, HD-58A (2023–present); Dan Wolgamott, HD-14B (2019–present) (previously endorsed Craig))

Local officials

- Melvin Carter, former mayor of Saint Paul (2018–2026)
- Abdul El-Sayed, former Wayne County health director (2023–2025) and candidate for U.S. senator from Michigan in 2026

Party officials

- Jaime Harrison, former Democratic National Committee chair (2021–2025)

Individuals

- Ms. Rachel, YouTuber and children's educator

Labor unions

- National Nurses United
- Service Employees International Union Minnesota State Council
- UNITE HERE Local 17
- United Food and Commercial Workers Local 663

Organizations

- Bend the Arc: Jewish Action
- Christopher Street Project
- End Citizens United
- Gen-Z for Change
- Indivisible
- Jane Fonda Climate PAC
- Minnesota 50501
- MoveOn
- A New Policy
- Our Revolution
- OutFront Minnesota
- Patriotic Millionaires
- Peace Action
- Vote Mama

Political parties

- Minnesota Democratic–Farmer–Labor Party
Declined to endorse

U.S. senators

- Amy Klobuchar, Minnesota (2007–present)
- ~~Tina Smith, Minnesota (2018–present)~~ (later endorsed Flanagan)

U.S. representatives

- Kelly Morrison, MN-03 (2025–present)

Statewide officials

- Steve Simon, secretary of state of Minnesota (2015–present)
- Tim Walz, governor of Minnesota (2019–present)

=== Fundraising ===
Italics indicate a withdrawn candidate.

Campaign finance reports as of July 22, 2026
Candidate	Raised	Spent	Cash on hand
Angie Craig (DFL)	$12,746,618	$9,179,437	$3,567,180
Peggy Flanagan (DFL)	$6,516,273	$5,457,669	$1,058,604
Source: Federal Election Commission

=== Polling ===
Poll source	Date(s) administered	Sample size (Note: Key: A – all adults RV – registered voters LV – likely voters V – unclear)	Margin of error	Angie Craig	Peggy Flanagan	Other	Undecided
KTSP/SurveyUSA	July 29 – August 4, 2026	513 (LV)	± 5.3%	42%	40%	3%	15%
Public Policy Polling (D) (Note: Poll sponsored by the Democratic Lieutenant Governors Association, which supports Flanagan)	July 23–24, 2026	672 (LV)	—	32%	46%	—	22%
KSTP/SurveyUSA	July 15–20, 2026	513 (LV)	± 5.0%	40%	40%	4%	16%
Public Policy Polling (D)	June 25–26, 2026	604 (LV)	—	36%	43%	—	22%
KSTP/SurveyUSA	June 11–16, 2026	513 (LV)	± 5.2%	41%	36%	6%	18%
GQR (D) (Note: Poll sponsored by Flanagan's campaign)	May 31 – June 3, 2026	500 (LV)	—	38%	55%	—	7%
Global Strategy Group (D) (Note: Poll sponsored by the North Star Dawn PAC, which supports Craig)	May 26–28, 2026	600 (LV)	± 4.0%	43%	42%	—	13%
Public Policy Polling (D)	April 29–30, 2026	652 (LV)	± 3.8%	33%	44%	—	23%
GQR (D)	January 14–20, 2026	600 (LV)	—	36%	49%	—	15%
Public Policy Polling (D) (Note: Polling commissioned by Clear Voice Minnesota, which supports Flanagan)	January 16–17, 2026	976 (LV)	± 3.1%	28%	40%	—	31%
Impact Research (D) (Note: Poll sponsored by Craig's campaign)	January 13–15, 2026	600 (LV)	± 4.0%	42%	45%	3%	9%
NRSC (R)	July 4–7, 2025	559 (LV)	± 3.3%	24%	30%	—	45%
Public Policy Polling (D)	February 14–15, 2025	668 (LV)	—	22%	52%	—	27%

=== Debate ===
2026 United States Senate election in Minnesota Democratic primary debate
No.	Date	Host	Moderator	Link	Democratic–Farmer–Labor	Democratic–Farmer–Labor
Key: P Participant A Absent N Not invited I Invited W Withdrawn						
Key: P Participant A Absent N Not invited I Invited W Withdrawn					Angie Craig	Peggy Flanagan
1	June 19, 2026	MPR News	Eric Eskola; Cathy Wurzer	YouTube	P	P
2	July 27, 2026	MPR News	Brian Bakst	YouTube	P	P

=== Results ===
Results by county Flanagan: 40–50%; 50–60%; 60–70%; 70–80%; Craig: 40–50%; 50–60%; 60–70%

Results by congressional district Flanagan: 50–60%; 60–70%; Craig: 40–50%

Results by state senate district Flanagan: 40–50%; 50–60%; 60–70%; 70–80%; 80–90%; Craig: 40–50%; 50–60%

Results by state house district Flanagan: 40–50%; 50–60%; 60–70%; 70–80%; 80–90%; Craig: 40–50%; 50–60%

Results by precinct Flanagan: 40–50%; 50–60%; 60–70%; 70–80%; 80–90%; >90%; Craig: 40–50%; 50–60%; 60–70%; 70–80%; 80–90%; >90%; Anderson: 40-50%; 60-70%; Nord: >90%; Kalberer: >90%; Tie: 20-30%; 30-40%; 40-50%; 50%; No votes

Democratic–Farmer–Labor primary results
Party	Candidate	Votes	%
Democratic (DFL)	Peggy Flanagan	411,853	59.0
Democratic (DFL)	Angie Craig	274,920	39.4
Democratic (DFL)	Kurt Michael Anderson	4,521	0.6
Democratic (DFL)	Billy Nord	2,896	0.4
Democratic (DFL)	George H. Kalberer	2,076	0.3
Democratic (DFL)	Peter John Murgic	1,661	0.2
Total votes		697,927	100.0

== Republican primary ==
=== Candidates ===
==== Nominee ====
- Michele Tafoya, reporter and retired sports broadcaster

==== Eliminated in primary ====
- Bob Carney Jr., perennial candidate
- Cynthia Gail, candidate for U.S. Senate in 2020
- Ahmad R. Hassan, perennial candidate and Democratic candidate for U.S. Senate in 2024
- Joyce Lacey, candidate for governor in 2022 and Independence nominee for U.S. Senate in 2024
- Patrick Munro, candidate for U.S. Senate in 2024
- Adam Schwarze, former Navy SEAL
- Tom Weiler, retired U.S. Navy officer and nominee for Minnesota's 3rd congressional district in 2022
- Royce White, former NBA player, nominee for U.S. Senate in 2024, and candidate for Minnesota's 5th congressional district in 2022

==== Did not file ====
- Alycia Gruenhagen, food co-op manager and Democratic candidate for Minnesota's 7th congressional district in 2020 and 2022, Republican candidate for U.S. Senate in 2024
- Mike Ruoho, business owner
- Mark York, farmer, computer scientist, and former White House Fellow

==== Withdrawn ====
- David Hann, former Republican Party of Minnesota chair (2021–2025) and minority leader of the Minnesota Senate (2013–2017)
- Mohamad Muse
- Ray Petersen, truck driver and candidate for U.S. Senate in 2024 (running for state senate)

==== Declined ====
- Willie Burton, former NBA player
- Julia Coleman, state senator from the 48th district (2021–present) and daughter-in-law of former U.S. senator Norm Coleman
- Lisa Demuth, speaker of the Minnesota House of Representatives (2025–present) from district 13A (2019–present) (running for governor)
- Zach Duckworth, state senator from the 57th district (2021–present)
- Tom Emmer, U.S. representative from Minnesota's 6th congressional district (2015–present) and nominee for governor in 2010
- Mike Lindell, former CEO of My Pillow, Inc., advisor to President Donald Trump, and candidate for RNC chair in 2023 (ran for governor, endorsed White)
- Chris Madel, attorney who represented Ryan Londregan
- Tim Pawlenty, former governor of Minnesota (2003–2011) and candidate for president in 2012
- Pete Stauber, U.S. representative from Minnesota's 8th congressional district (2019–present)
- Ryan Wilson, attorney and nominee for state auditor in 2022 (running for lieutenant governor)

=== Endorsements ===
Adam Schwarze

U.S. senators

- John Hoeven, North Dakota (2011–present)
- Tim Sheehy, Montana (2025–present)

U.S. representatives

- John McGuire, VA-05 (2025–present)

Polítical parties

- Republican Party of Minnesota
Michele Tafoya

U.S. senators

- Tim Scott, South Carolina (2013–present)

Individuals

- Tony Dungy, former NFL head coach and player
- Jason Garrett, commentator for NBC Sports and former NFL coach and quarterback

Organizations

- Maggie's List
- National Republican Senatorial Committee
Royce White

Individuals

- Mike Lindell, founder of My Pillow and candidate for governor in 2026

=== Fundraising ===
Italics indicate a withdrawn candidate.

Campaign finance reports as of June 30, 2026
Candidate	Raised	Spent	Cash on hand
David Hann (R)	$133,465	$133,465	$0
Ray Petersen (R)	$973	$973	$0
Mike Ruoho (R)	$45	$550	$0
Adam Schwarze (R)	$1,394,222	$1,183,000	$211,222
Michele Tafoya (R)	$4,669,609	$2,588,977	$2,080,632
Tom Weiler (R)	$219,869	$76,099	$145,530
Royce White (R)	$649,510	$740,387	$48,231
Mark York (R)	$74,070	$69,528	$4,542
Source: Federal Election Commission

=== Polling ===
Poll source	Date(s) administered	Sample size	Margin of error	Adam Schwarze	Michele Tafoya	Tom Weiler	Royce White	Other	Undecided
Deep Root Analytics (R) (Note: Poll sponsored by Minnesota Forward PAC, which supports Tafoya's campaign)	August 3–4, 2026	652 (LV)	± 3.8%	18%	47%	–	15%	4%	15%
KSTP/SurveyUSA	July 29 – August 4, 2026	458 (LV)	± 5.6%	5%	48%	3%	13%	8%	24%
KSTP/SurveyUSA	July 15–20, 2026	478 (LV)	± 5.4%	5%	41%	7%	10%	8%	28%
KSTP/SurveyUSA	June 11–16, 2026	450 (LV)	± 5.4%	7%	36%	7%	15%	27%	8%
Quantus Insights (R)	May 6–9, 2026	663 (LV)	± 4.0%	4%	52%	2%	9%	6%	27%
Peak Insights (R) (Note: Poll sponsored by Tafoya's campaign)	January 31 – February 1, 2026	500 (LV)	± 4.0%	4%	41%	1%	11%	9% (Note: David Hann with 3%; "Someone else" with 6%)	34%

=== Results ===
Results by county Tafoya: 30–40%; 40–50%; 50–60%; 60–70%; Schwarze: 30–40%; 40–50%

Results by congressional district Tafoya: 40–50%; 50–60%; 60–70%

Results by state senate district Tafoya: 30–40%; 40–50%; 50–60%; 60–70%

Results by state house district Tafoya: 30–40%; 40–50%; 50–60%; 60–70%; 70–80%; Schwarze: 30–40%

Results by precinct Tafoya: 20–30%; 30–40%; 40–50%; 50–60%; 60–70%; 70–80%; 80–90%; >90%; Schwarze: 20–30%; 30–40%; 40–50%; 50–60%; 60–70%; 70–80%; 80–90%; >90%; White: 20–30%; 30–40%; 40–50%; 50–60%; 60–70%; 70–80%; 80–90%; >90%; Weiler: 20–30%; 30–40%; 40–50%; 50–60%; 60–70%; 70–80%; >90%; Lacey: 60-70%; >90%; Munro: 30-40%; 40-50%; 60-70%; >90%; Gail: 40-50%; 60-70%; >90%; Carney: 30-40%; >90%; Hassan: >90%; Tie: 10-20%; 20-30%; 30-40%; 40-50%; 50%; No votes

Republican primary results
Party	Candidate	Votes	%
Republican	Michele Tafoya	211,813	52.1
Republican	Adam Schwarze	97,470	24.0
Republican	Royce White	45,374	11.2
Republican	Tom Weiler	24,247	6.0
Republican	Joyce Lacey	7,474	1.8
Republican	Patrick Munro	7,096	1.7
Republican	Cynthia Gail	5,929	1.5
Republican	Bob Carney Jr.	5,678	1.4
Republican	Ahmad R. Hassan	1,742	0.4
Total votes		406,823	100.0

== Independents and others ==
=== Candidates ===
==== Declared ====
- Marisa Simonetti, business owner
- Rebecca Whiting (Libertarian), farmer, nominee for U.S. Senate in 2024

=== Write-in candidates ===
==== Declared ====
- Oriana Peral Lorainne Baker
- Alycia R. Gruenhagen
- Jay Willms

== General election ==
=== Predictions ===
Source	Ranking	As of
The Cook Political Report	Lean D	November 2, 2026
Decision Desk HQ	Likely D	November 3, 2026
The Economist (Note: The Economist's prediction model uses unconventional terminology. For the purpose of equivalency, their "Very Likely" ratings are formatted as a "Likely" rating while "Likely" ratings are formatted as a "Lean" rating.)	Lean D	November 3, 2026
FiftyPlusOne	Likely D	November 3, 2026
Fox News	Lean D	November 1, 2026
Inside Elections	Lean D	October 29, 2026
MS NOW	Lean D	October 29, 2026
NBC News	Likely D	November 3, 2026
RealClearPolitics	Lean D	November 2, 2026
Sabato's Crystal Ball	Likely D	November 2, 2026
Silver Bulletin	Likely D	November 3, 2026
Split Ticket	Likely D	November 2, 2026

=== Post-primary endorsements ===
Peggy Flanagan (DFL)

Executive branch officials

- Hillary Clinton, former secretary of state (2009–2013) and Democratic nominee for president in 2016
- Barack Obama, former president of the United States (2009–2017)

U.S. senators

- Amy Klobuchar, Minnesota (2007–present) and 2026 Minnesota gubernatorial nominee

U.S. representatives

- Angie Craig, MN-02 (2019–present) and primary candidate for this seat
- Alexandria Ocasio-Cortez, NY-14 (2019–present)

Labor unions

- United Auto Workers

Organizations

- EMILYs List
- Giffords
- Human Rights Campaign PAC
- J Street
- League of Conservation Voters Action Fund
- Reproductive Freedom for All
Michele Tafoya (R)

Executive branch officials

- Donald Trump, president of the United States (2017–2021, 2025–present)

Labor unions

- Police Officers Federation of Minneapolis

Organizations

- Minnesota Farm Bureau PAC
- Minnesota Police and Peace Officers Association

=== Fundraising ===
Campaign finance reports as of October 14, 2026
Candidate	Raised	Spent	Cash on hand
Peggy Flanagan (DFL)	$11,563,963	$10,570,749	$993,214
Michele Tafoya (R)	$12,501,786	$9,682,730	$2,819,387
Rebecca Whiting (L)	$3,756	$1,828	$1,927
Source: Federal Election Commission

=== Polling ===
Aggregate polls

Source of poll aggregation	Dates administered	Dates updated	Peggy Flanagan (DFL)	Michele Tafoya (R)	Other/ Undecided (Note: Calculated by taking the difference of 100% and all other candidates combined.)	Margin
270toWin	October 13 – November 1, 2026	November 3, 2026	50.2%	44.8%	5.0%	Flanagan +5.4%
Decision Desk HQ	through November 1, 2026	November 3, 2026	49.7%	43.4%	6.9%	Flanagan +6.3%
FiftyPlusOne	through November 1, 2026	November 3, 2026	49.4%	43.2%	7.4%	Flanagan +6.2%
RealClearPolitics	October 5 – November 1, 2026	November 2, 2026	48.9%	43.7%	7.4%	Flanagan +5.2%
Silver Bulletin	through November 1, 2026	November 3, 2026	49.5%	43.5%	7.0%	Flanagan +6.0%
Average			49.6%	43.7%	6.7%	Flanagan +5.9%

Poll source	Date(s) administered	Sample size	Margin of error	Peggy Flanagan (DFL)	Michele Tafoya (R)	Other	Undecided
Research Co.	October 30 – November 1, 2026	450 (LV)	± 4.6%	48%	43%	2% (Note: "Some other candidate" with 2%)	7%
AtlasIntel	October 28 – November 1, 2026	2,133 (LV)	± 2.0%	48%	46%	5% (Note: "Other" with 3%; "Would not vote" with 2%)	1%
Survey 160	October 27 – November 1, 2026	1,365 (LV)	± 3.7%	52% (Note: With voters who lean towards a given candidate)	43%	2%	2%
Survey 160	October 27 – November 1, 2026	1,365 (LV)	± 3.7%	52%	43%	1%	4%
Survey 160	October 27 – November 1, 2026	1,423 (RV)	± 3.7%	52%	42%	3%	3%
Survey 160	October 27 – November 1, 2026	1,423 (RV)	± 3.7%	51%	42%	2%	5%
InsiderAdvantage (R)	October 29–30, 2026	1,200 (LV)	± 2.8%	49%	46%	4% (Note: Rebecca Whiting (L) with 3%; Marisa Simonetti (I) with 1%)	1%
KSTP/SurveyUSA	October 24–28, 2026	714 (LV)	± 4.2%	48%	41%	4% (Note: Rebecca Whiting (L) and Marisa Simonetti (I) with 2%)	7%
New York Times/Siena University	October 19–26, 2026	752 (LV)	± 4.1%	54%	40%	0%	5%
Victory Insights (R) (Note: Poll commissioned by Tafoya's campaign.)	October 21–22, 2026	1,194 (LV)	—	48%	44%	2%	6%
Rasmussen Reports (R)	October 20–21, 2026	1,182 (LV)	± 3.0%	48%	45%	—	7%
Trafalgar Group (R)	October 13–15, 2026	1,079 (LV)	± 2.9%	48%	45%	2% (Note: Marisa Simonetti (L) & Rebecca Whiting (G) with 1%)	5%
KSTP/SurveyUSA	October 8–12, 2026	718 (LV)	± 4.2%	45%	42%	4%	9%
Mason-Dixon Polling & Strategy (Note: Poll sponsored by KARE 11 & The Minnesota Star Tribune)	October 5–7, 2026	800 (LV)	± 3.5%	47%	43%	1%	9%
Rasmussen Reports (R)	October 5–7, 2026	856 (LV)	± 3.0%	48%	45%	—	7%
Morning Consult (Note: Poll conducted for The Daily Agenda)	October 2–7, 2026	1,000 (RV)	± 3.1%	45%	41%	2%	12%
GQR (D)	October 1–4, 2026	800 (LV)	± 3.5%	53%	44%	—	3%
GQR (D)	October 1–4, 2026	800 (LV)	± 3.5%	50%	42%	6% (Note: Marisa Simonetti (I) with 4%; Rebecca Whiting (L) with 2%)	3%
Big Data Poll (R)	September 29–30, 2026	622 (LV)	± 4.0%	46%	44%	10% (Note: Rebecca Whiting (L) & Marisa Simonetti (I)/Other/Not voting with 5%)	—
Big Data Poll (R)	September 29–30, 2026	622 (LV)	± 4.0%	40%	38%	7% (Note: Rebecca Whiting (L) with 4%; Marisa Simonetti (I)/Other/Not voting with 3%)	15%
InsiderAdvantage (R)	September 28–29, 2026	1,200 (LV)	± 3.0%	46%	45%	3% (Note: Rebecca Whiting (L) with 2%; Marisa Simonetti (I) with 1%)	6%
co/efficient (R)	September 14–15, 2026	833 (LV)	± 3.4%	43%	42%	4%	11%
KSTP/SurveyUSA	September 9–14, 2026	654 (LV)	± 4.4%	42%	42%	4%	12%
Quantus Insights (R)	September 8–10, 2026	720 (LV)	± 4.2%	48%	44%	—	7%
TIPP Insights (R) (Note: Poll sponsored by the League of American Workers)	August 31 – September 2, 2026	1,494 (RV)	± 2.7%	40%	38%	8% (Note: Marisa Simonetti (I) with 4%; "Someone else" with 3%; Rebecca Whiting (L) with 1%)	14%
TIPP Insights (R)	August 31 – September 2, 2026	1,201 (LV)	± 3.0%	44%	42%	6% (Note: Marisa Simonetti (I) with 3%; "Someone else" with 2%; Rebecca Whiting (L) with 1%)	8%
Deep Root Analytics (R)	August 17–18, 2026	597 (RV)	± 4.0%	50%	45%	—	5%
KTSP/SurveyUSA	August 13–17, 2026	661 (LV)	± 4.3%	46%	41%	2% (Note: Marisa Simonetti (I) & Rebecca Whiting (L) with 1%)	11%
	August 11, 2026	Primary elections are held					
Impact Research (D)	May 26–28, 2026	808 (LV)	± 3.5%	51%	44%	—	7%
Emerson College	February 6–8, 2026	1,000 (LV)	± 3.0%	47%	41%	4% (Note: "Someone else" with 4%)	8%
Impact Research (D)	July 8–11, 2025	604 (LV)	± 4.0%	48%	45%	—	7%

Hypothetical polling

Angie Craig vs. Michele Tafoya

Poll source	Date(s) administered	Sample size	Margin of error	Angie Craig (DFL)	Michele Tafoya (R)	Undecided
Impact Research (D)	May 26–28, 2026	808 (LV)	± 3.5%	51%	44%	7%
Emerson College	February 6–8, 2026	1,000 (LV)	± 3.0%	47%	40%	13%
Impact Research (D)	July 8–11, 2025	604 (LV)	± 4.0%	49%	45%	6%

Angie Craig vs. Generic Republican

Poll source	Date(s) administered	Sample size	Margin of error	Angie Craig (DFL)	Generic Republican	Undecided
Public Policy Polling (D)	September 15–16, 2025	1,015 (V)	—	47%	43%	10%

Peggy Flanagan vs. Generic Republican

Poll source	Date(s) administered	Sample size	Margin of error	Peggy Flanagan (DFL)	Generic Republican	Undecided
Public Policy Polling (D)	September 15–16, 2025	1,015 (V)	—	46%	44%	10%

=== Results ===
2026 United States Senate election in Minnesota
Party	Candidate	Votes	%	±%
Democratic (DFL)	Peggy Flanagan	1,520,871	53.70	+4.96%
Republican	Michele Tafoya	1,233,476	43.56	+0.06%
Independent	Marisa Simonetti	41,574	1.47	+1.47%
Libertarian	Rebecca Whiting	32,493	1.15	+1.15%
Write-in		3,381	0.12	+0.05%
Total votes		2,831,795	100.0	N/A

==== By county ====
Counties that flipped from Republican to Democratic

- Anoka (largest municipality: Blaine)

Counties that flipped from Democratic to Republican

- Mahnomen (largest municipality: Mahnomen)

==== By congressional district ====
Flanagan and Tafoya each won four congressional districts.

District	Flanagan	Tafoya	Elected Representative
1st	45.87%	51.03%	Jake Johnson
2nd	53.76%	43.58%	Matt Little
3rd	60.08%	37.60%	Kelly Morrison
4th	69.90%	27.54%	Betty McCollum
5th	82.83%	14.98%	Ilhan Omar
6th	40.96%	56.26%	Tom Emmer
7th	31.79%	65.10%	Michelle Fischbach
8th	43.93%	52.88%	Pete Stauber

== See also ==
- 2026 Minnesota elections

== Notes ==
Partisan clients
