= Michele Tafoya =

American former sports broadcaster (born 1964)

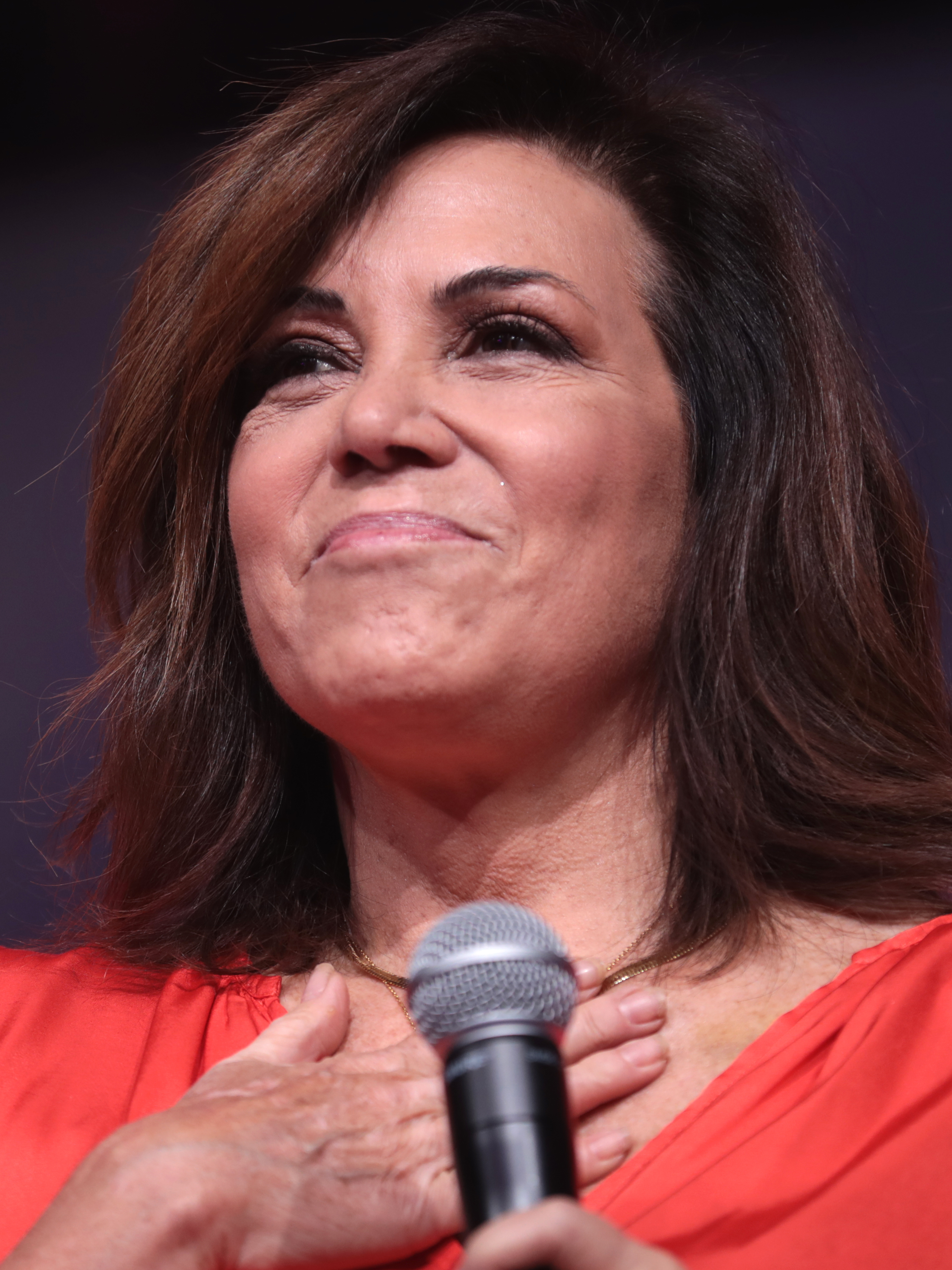
- Tafoya in 2023
- Born: Michele Joan Tafoya; December 17, 1964 (age 61); Manhattan Beach, California, U.S.
- Education: University of California, Berkeley (BA); University of Southern California (MBA)
- Political party: Republican
- Spouse: Mark Vandersall
- Children: 2
- Awards: Sports Emmy Award winner (5)
- Sports commentary career
- Genres: Play-by-play; Sideline reporter
- Sports: Football; Tennis; Basketball
- Employer: NBC Sports (2011–2022); ESPN (2000–2011); CBS Sports (1994–1999)
- Website: Campaign website

Michele Joan Tafoya (born December 17, 1964) is an American former sports broadcaster. She worked for ABC, NBC, CBS, and ESPN. After beginning her career on Minneapolis–Saint Paul-based radio and television stations, she became the host of CBS Sports Spectacular in 1994. Tafoya later joined ABC and ESPN, covering football and basketball. Most notably, from 2011 to 2022, she served as a sideline reporter for NBC Sunday Night Football.

Since her departure from sportscasting, Tafoya has become involved in politics, making television appearances to discuss U.S. politics and culture. She was the Republican nominee in the 2026 United States Senate election in Minnesota; she lost to Democratic nominee Peggy Flanagan in the general election by a margin of 10%.

== Early life ==
Tafoya is the daughter of Wilma (née Conley) and Orlando Tafoya. Her father was Hispanic She has a brother and three sisters. She attended Aviation High School in Redondo Beach, California, and Mira Costa High School in Manhattan Beach, California. She received a Bachelor of Arts degree in mass communications from the University of California, Berkeley in 1988, and a master's degree in business administration from the University of Southern California in 1991.

== Sports broadcasting career ==
Tafoya's main work as a sports broadcaster was for CBS, ABC, ESPN, and NBC, but she also did other sports broadcasting, sometimes working more than one job at a time. In 1993 she worked for WAQS in Charlotte, North Carolina, under the pseudonym "Mickey Conley". Starting in 1994, Tafoya worked as a host and reporter for KFAN-AM in Minneapolis–Saint Paul, primarily on Minnesota Vikings and University of Minnesota women's basketball broadcasts. She also worked from 1994 to 1997 at WCCO-TV in Minneapolis–Saint Paul as a sports anchor and reporter. In 1999, she took on another assignment, with the Midwest Sports Channel, serving as a Minnesota Timberwolves host and sideline reporter, as well as a play-by-play commentator for women's Big Ten basketball and volleyball.

=== CBS Sports (1994–1999) ===
Tafoya joined CBS Sports in September 1994 as a reporter and host for the CBS Television Network's sports anthology show CBS Sports Spectacular and college basketball coverage. She served as a host of At The Half and as a reporter for college football games. She made her on-air debut at the 1994 U.S. Open Tennis Championships.

In 1997, The American Women in Radio and Television honored Tafoya with a Gracie Award for "Outstanding Achievement by an Individual On-Air TV Personality" for her play-by-play calling of WNBA games on Lifetime Television. Tafoya served as a reporter for the network's coverage of the NFL and college football—including the 1998 National Championship Orange Bowl—and was late-night co-host with Al Trautwig of the 1998 Winter Olympics in Nagano. She also hosted CBS's NCAA Tournament selection show, Goodwill Games, and the U.S. Open Tennis Championships coverage. She left CBS at the end of 1999, after five years with the network.

=== ABC Sports and ESPN (2000–2011) ===
Tafoya joined ABC Sports and ESPN in January 2000, working as a sideline reporter for ABC Sports' Monday Night Football during the 2004 NFL season and the 2005 NFL season before the program shifted to ESPN; she worked the sideline for ESPN Monday Night Football beginning in 2006. Tafoya co-hosted the Mike Tirico Show on ESPN radio. She helped ABC in its coverage of Super Bowl XL in Detroit as a sideline reporter with Suzy Kolber.

Tafoya was loaned to NBC Sports for the 2000 Summer Olympics as a reporter for rhythmic gymnastics and the play-by-play woman for softball. On October 10, 2003, she poured beer over two fans beneath her luxury box at the Metrodome during a University of Minnesota versus University of Michigan game. She admitted to losing her composure, said she was embarrassed by the incident, and issued a public apology. Tafoya formerly worked at NBA games on ABC and ESPN. On October 21, 2008, she announced she would resign from her duties as head NBA sideline reporter.

Tafoya also had a stint as the men's and women's NCAA basketball play-by-play and studio host and as a college football and basketball sideline reporter. She was a substitute host on Pardon the Interruption and a panelist on The Sports Reporters II. Her other ESPN assignments include calling WNBA games, hosting skiing telecasts, and working on ESPN's college basketball selection shows as a reporter. She was a correspondent for SportsCenter and Outside the Lines. At the end of the 2010–11 NFL season, she left ESPN for NBC Sports.

=== NBC Sports (2011–2022) ===
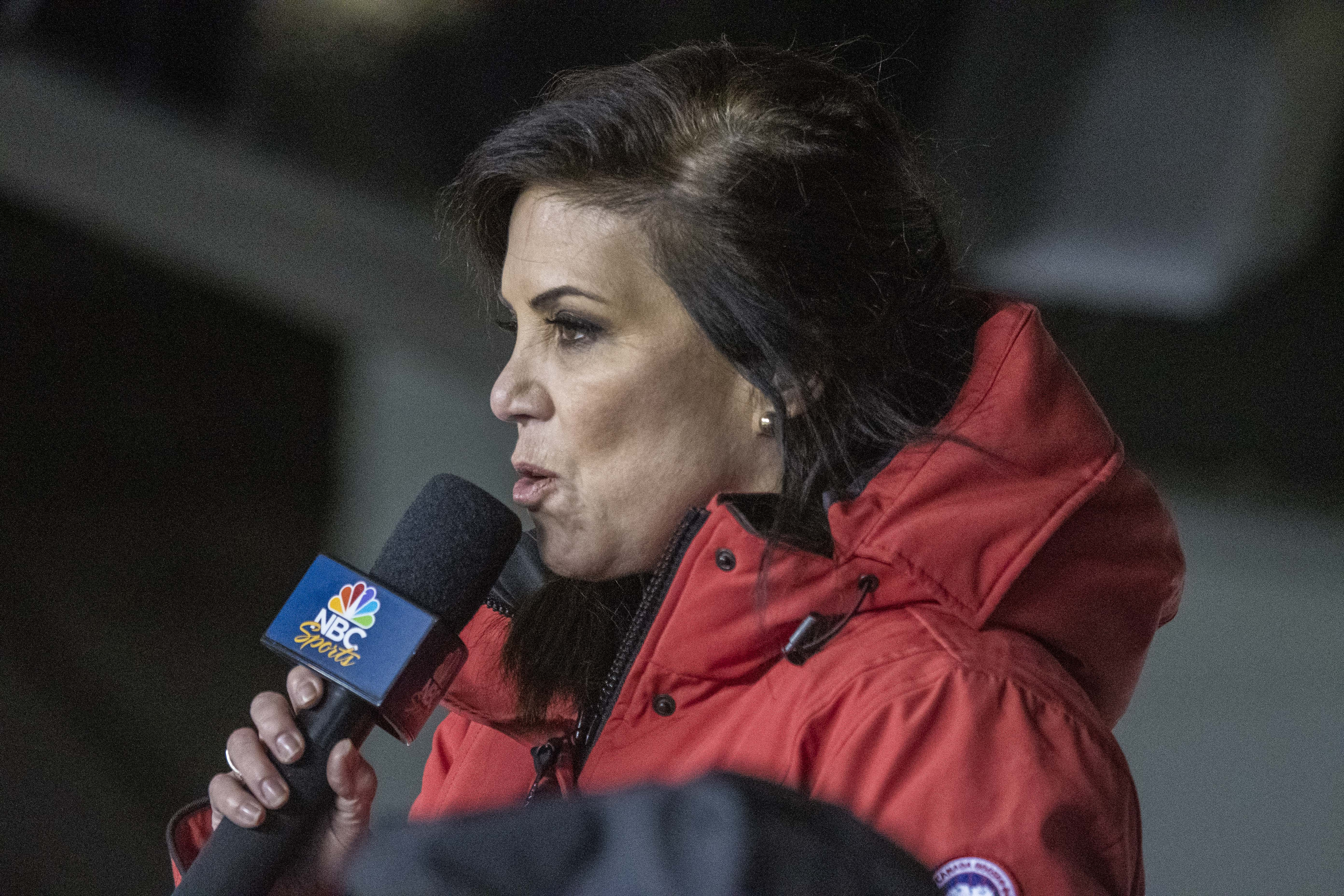
Michele Tafoya as sideline reporter for NBC Sports in January 2021

On May 4, 2011, Tafoya became the new sideline reporter for NBC Sunday Night Football, replacing Andrea Kremer and rejoining former co-worker and announcer Al Michaels. Tafoya also covered swimming during the Summer Olympics for NBC. On January 11, 2022, NBC confirmed an article by Andrew Marchand of the New York Post that Tafoya would leave the network, to pursue other opportunities, with Super Bowl LVI as her final assignment.

== General talk radio career ==
Returning to WCCO-AM, Tafoya was announced as the new evening drive time talk radio host on April 19, 2009. Her WCCO show began on June 1, 2009, when she teamed with afternoon host and lead-in Don Shelby on the schedule from 3:00 to 3:30 p.m., with Tafoya taking over from 3:30 to 6 p.m. She stepped down from this position on January 27, 2012, citing a need to spend more time with her children.

Tafoya joined "The KQ Morning Show" on KQRS-FM as co-host with longtime morning personality Tom Barnard on September 8, 2016. She left that show in March 2020.

== Political career ==
On February 14, 2022, the day after she left NBC Sports, Republican Minnesota gubernatorial candidate Kendall Qualls announced Tafoya would co-chair his campaign. After Qualls withdrew from that race a few months later, Tafoya continued to become more involved with Republican politics, starting a podcast originally called "Sideline Sanity" and later renamed "The Michele Tafoya Podcast".

On January 21, 2026, Tafoya announced her candidacy in the 2026 United States Senate election in Minnesota as a Republican. Tafoya has called herself a "pro-choice conservative with libertarian leanings".

Tafoya initially backed the 2026 Iran war but shifted her stance as the conflict extended and economic pressure grew.

Early in her campaign, Tafoya defended Operation Metro Surge and used photos of ICE agents in her campaign videos, but she later criticized Kristi Noem's handling of the operation and condemned the killings of Renee Good and Alex Pretti.

In September 2026, CNN reported that Tafoya had previously posted on Twitter that she was "embarrassed to say I live in Minnesota" in a since-deleted 2023 post, despite later denying she had made such a statement. CNN also reported several other instances when Tafoya said she planned to leave Minnesota. She described Minnesota unfavorably, while calling herself a part-time Florida resident and praising Florida as an example of conservative governance.

In October 2026, President Donald Trump endorsed Tafoya. On November 3, Tafoya lost to Lieutenant Governor Peggy Flanagan by over ten percentage points.

== Personal life ==
Tafoya and her husband, Mark Vandersall, have a son and an adopted daughter. The family lives in Edina, Minnesota.

Party political offices
Preceded by Jason Lewis	Republican nominee for U.S. Senator from Minnesota (Class 2); 2026	Most recent
