= Democratic Lieutenant Governors Association =

Organization of U.S. Democratic lieutenant governors

- Chair: Kyle Evans Gay (DE)
- Vice Chair: Tobias Read (OR)
- Founded: 2018 (refounded)
- Headquarters: Washington, D.C.
- Affiliated: Democratic Party; Democratic Governors Association
- State lieutenant governors: 23 / 50
- Territorial lieutenant governors: 2 / 5

Website
- demlgs.org

The Democratic Lieutenant Governors Association (DLGA) is a Washington, D.C.–based organization founded in 2018, consisting of U.S. state and territorial lieutenant governors affiliated with the Democratic Party. The focus of the group is on electing Democratic lieutenant governors and candidates. The DGLA's Republican counterpart is the Republican Lieutenant Governors Association and it is not affiliated with the nonpartisan National Lieutenant Governors Association.

Lieutenant Governor of Delaware Kyle Evans Gay is the current chair, and Secretary of State of Oregon (lieutenant governor equivalent) Tobias Read is the current vice chair.

== History ==
=== 2018 re-founding ===
The position of lieutenant governor has had a reputation for its lack of clear responsibilities or duties beyond being the first in the line of succession to be governor in many states. The DLGA was re-founded by Democratic lieutenant governors in 2018 seeking to change this by forming a national organization backing liberal candidates for the post and then support their members in other elections, as many tend to run for another office. At the time of its founding, there were only 14 Democratic lieutenant governors in office compared to 31 Republicans, who had founded their own organization— the Republican Lieutenant Governors Association— in 2002. The DLGA sought to function like the Democratic Congressional Campaign Committee by funneling donations to candidates and coordinating messaging in the 2018 election and beyond.

Justin Fairfax of Virginia served as the group's first chair, but resigned in 2019 after being accused of sexual assault.

By 2020, the number of Democratic lieutenant governors increased from 14 to 24. The group's chair at the time, Kathy Hochul, focused strongly on recruiting and fundraising for candidates.

Austin Davis of Pennsylvania was elected the group's chair unopposed and Kim Driscoll of Massachusetts as vice chair in December 2024. He celebrated the diversity of the DLGA's membership, which is predominantly women or people of color at 80% in 2024 compared to just 12 women and 4 people of color serving as governors. In 2025, Davis stated that the group would make a major push to support its members running for open gubernatorial and U.S. Senate elections in the 2026 United States elections.

=== Political donations and campaigns ===
==== 2024 ====
The DLGA dropped approximately $2 million in the lieutenant gubernatorial election in North Carolina, including a significant campaign to boost the eventual Republican nominee Hal Weatherman in the primary as he was considered a weaker candidate in the general election against eventual winner Rachel Hunt. It also spent around $1 million boosting lieutenant Governor of Delaware Bethany Hall-Long in the 2024 Delaware gubernatorial election, although she ultimately lost with 36.62% of the vote in the primary to Matt Meyer.

==== 2025 ====
In June 2025, the DLGA announced it would donate $1 million to Democratic nominee Ghazala Hashmi in the 2025 Virginia lieutenant gubernatorial election, which it said was the largest donation ever received by a lieutenant governor nominee in the state.

==== 2026 ====
The DLGA’s political operation announced endorsements for numerous lieutenant governors in open races, including Peggy Flanagan for the open senate seat in Minnesota, Juliana Stratton for the open senate seat in Illinois, Garlin Gilchrist for the open gubernatorial election in Michigan, and Eleni Kounalakis for the open gubernatorial election in California. The organization chose not to endorse Antonio Delgado in New York, who is challenging incumbent governor Kathy Hochul. In the 2026 New Jersey's 11th congressional district special election, the DLGA announced it would support former lieutenant governor of New Jersey Tahesha Way in the Democratic primary. The group spent more than $1.7 million in advertisements supporting Way, who placed third in the primary.

== Leadership ==
The DGLA is led by two elected Democratic lieutenant governors as chair and vice chair respectively as well as an executive director.

=== List of chairs ===
Chair	State	Term
Justin Fairfax	Virginia	2018–2019
Kathy Hochul	New York	2020–2021
Garlin Gilchrist	Michigan	2021–2022
Bethany Hall-Long	Delaware	2022–2023
Peggy Flanagan	Minnesota	2023–2024
Austin Davis	Pennsylvania	2024–2025
Kyle Evans Gay	Delaware	2024–2025

=== List of executive directors ===
Executive director	Term
Roshan Patel	2018–2023
Kevin Holst	2023–present

== List of current Democratic lieutenant governors ==
There are currently 20 Democratic lieutenant governors from states who are members of the DLGA, including 2 secretaries of state from Arizona and Oregon which do not have a lieutenant governor position.

Current lieutenant governor	State	Past	Took office	Current Term
Adrian Fontes	Arizona	List (Note: Arizona does not have a lieutenant governor position, the closest equivalent is the Secretary of State of Arizona.)	2023	First term
Eleni Kounalakis	California	List	2019	Second term
Dianne Primavera	Colorado	List	2019	Second term
Susan Bysiewicz	Connecticut	List	2019	Second term
Kyle Evans Gay	Delaware	List	2025	First term
Sylvia Luke	Hawaii	List	2022	First term
Juliana Stratton	Illinois	List	2019	Second term
David Toland	Kansas	List	2019	Second term
Jacqueline Coleman	Kentucky	List	2019	Second term
Aruna Miller	Maryland	List	2023	First term
Kim Driscoll	Massachusetts	List	2023	First term
Garlin Gilchrist	Michigan	List	2019	Second term
Peggy Flanagan	Minnesota	List	2019	Second term
Dale Caldwell	New Jersey	List	2026	First term
Howie Morales	New Mexico	List	2019	Second term
Antonio Delgado	(New York (state)) New York	List	2022(appointed)	First term
Rachel Hunt	North Carolina	List	2025	First term
Tobias Read	Oregon	List (Note: Oregon does not have a lieutenant governor position, the closest equivalent is the Secretary of State of Oregon.)	2025	First term
Austin Davis	Pennsylvania	List	2023	First term
Sabina Matos	Rhode Island	List	2021	Second term
Ghazala Hashmi	Virginia	List	2026	First term
Denny Heck	(Washington (state)) Washington	List	2021	Second term
Sara Rodriguez	Wisconsin	List	2023	First term

There are currently 2 Democratic lieutenant governors of U.S. territories.

Current lieutenant governor	Territory	Past	Took office	Current term
Josh Tenorio	Guam	List	2019	Second term
Tregenza Roach	(United States Virgin Islands) U.S. Virgin Islands	List	2019	Second term
