= Matt Birk =

American football player (born 1976)

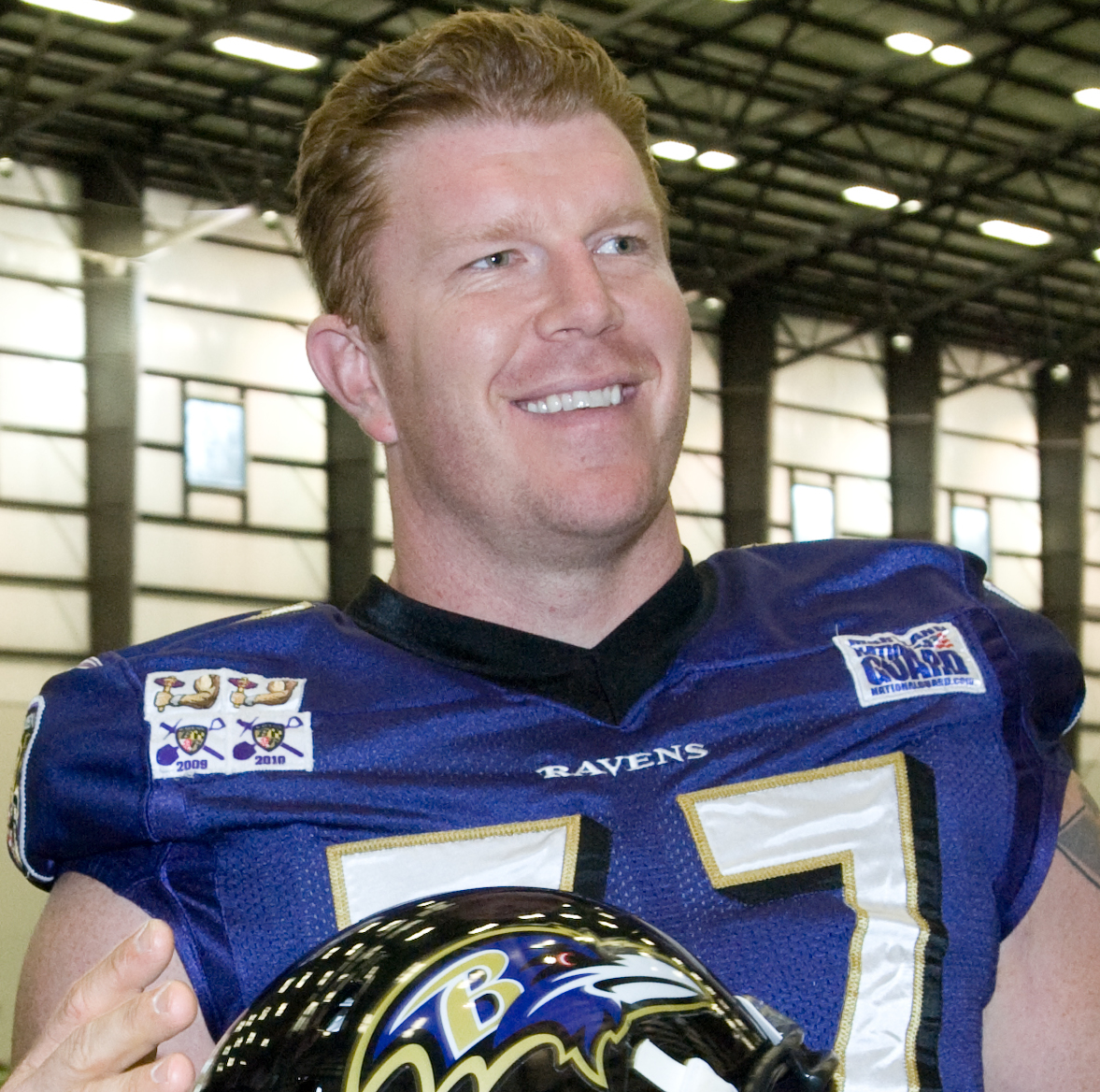
- Birk with the Baltimore Ravens in 2012

No. 75, 78, 77
- Position: Center

Personal information
- Born: July 23, 1976 (age 50); Saint Paul, Minnesota, U.S.
- Listed height: 6 ft 4 in (1.93 m)
- Listed weight: 310 lb (141 kg)

Career information
- High school: Cretin-Derham Hall (Saint Paul)
- College: Harvard (1994–1997)
- NFL draft: 1998: 6th round, 173rd overall pick

Career history
- Minnesota Vikings (1998–2008); Baltimore Ravens (2009–2012)

Awards and highlights
- Super Bowl champion (XLVII); Walter Payton NFL Man of the Year Award (2011); 2× First-team All-Pro (2000, 2003); 6× Pro Bowl (2000, 2001, 2003, 2004, 2006, 2007); 50 Greatest Vikings

Career NFL statistics
- Games played: 210
- Games started: 187
- Fumble recoveries: 5
- Stats at Pro Football Reference

Matthew Robert Birk (born July 23, 1976) is an American former professional football player who was a center for 15 seasons in the National Football League (NFL), primarily for the Minnesota Vikings.

Born and raised in Saint Paul, Minnesota, Birk played college football for the Harvard Crimson and was selected in the sixth round of the 1998 NFL draft by the Minnesota Vikings. He spent his first two seasons as a backup offensive lineman. He became the starting center in 2000 and went on to be selected to six Pro Bowls and two All-Pro first teams during his career. As a free agent following the 2008 season, Birk joined the Baltimore Ravens. After the Ravens won Super Bowl XLVII, Birk retired from the NFL. In 2011, he was awarded the Walter Payton NFL Man of the Year Award.

Following his retirement in 2012, Birk returned to Minnesota. He started a Catholic school in Burnsville in 2019. Active in pro-life causes and local Republican politics, Birk joined Scott Jensen's gubernatorial candidacy in March 2022. Jensen and Birk faced incumbents Tim Walz and Peggy Flanagan in the general election and lost the race.

== Early life and college ==
Birk attended Cretin-Derham Hall High School in St. Paul, Minnesota, and was a letterman and standout in football, basketball, and track and field. He was an All-St. Paul Conference honoree, an Academic All-State honoree, and an All-State honoree in both football and basketball. Birk graduated from Cretin-Derham in 1994.

Birk attended Harvard University to play college football for the Harvard Crimson. He attained All-Ivy League, All-New England and Division I-AA All-Eastern College Athletic Conference first-team football honors. Birk graduated from Harvard University in 1998 with a degree in economics.

== Professional career ==
Pre-draft measurables
Height	Weight	Arm length	Hand span	40-yard dash	10-yard split	20-yard split	20-yard shuttle	Vertical jump	Broad jump	Bench press
6 ft 4 7/8 in (1.95 m)	308 lb (140 kg)	32 1/2 in (0.83 m)	9 3/4 in (0.25 m)	5.40 s	1.83 s	3.09 s	4.45 s	29.5 in (0.75 m)	8 ft 10 in (2.69 m)	21 reps

=== Minnesota Vikings ===
Ranked as the No. 16 offensive tackle available, Birk was selected by the Minnesota Vikings in the sixth round with the 173rd overall pick of the 1998 NFL draft. He was described by Sports Illustrated as "maybe the best Ivy League prospect to come along in several years", who "could be a nice developmental type pick".

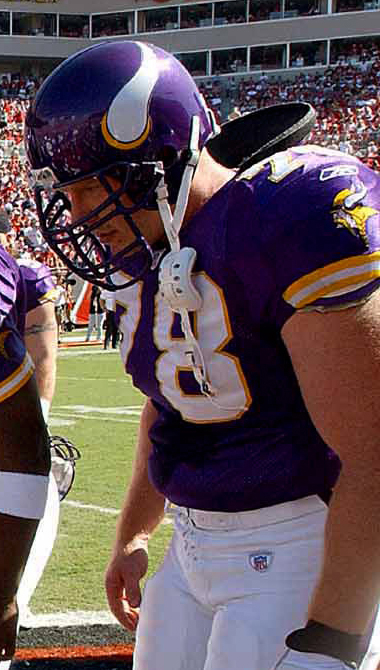
Birk with the Minnesota Vikings in 2002

During his first two seasons with the Vikings, he appeared in 22 games as a backup offensive lineman. In 2000, he took over the starting center position for the Vikings, starting all 16 games and was named to his first Pro Bowl team. Birk started every game for the Vikings at center from 2000 to 2003.

In 2004, Birk missed the last four games of the season due to surgery to treat a sports hernia. He missed the entire 2005 season with a hip injury that required surgery.

Birk returned to form in 2006, anchoring the Vikings offensive line from the center spot and earning his fifth career Pro Bowl selection. In 2007, Birk was named Minnesota Vikings Man of the Year for the sixth year in a row. He also earned his sixth Pro Bowl selection, tying Mick Tingelhoff for most Pro Bowl appearances by a Vikings center.

In the 2010 Minnesota Vikings season, the 50th anniversary of the Minnesota Vikings, he was ranked by the team as one of their 50 greatest players.

He returned to the Vikings' home stadium, the Hubert H. Humphrey Metrodome, for the team's final game in the stadium before its demolition for the construction of U.S. Bank Stadium. The team named him honorary captain for the finale game.

In rankings since his career with the Vikings, he has been ranked as one of the team's greatest players.

=== Baltimore Ravens ===
An unrestricted free agent in the 2009 offseason, Birk signed a three-year, $12 million contract with the Baltimore Ravens on March 4. The deal included $6 million guaranteed.

In March 2012, Birk signed a new three-year deal with the Ravens. He won his first career championship during Super Bowl XLVII against the San Francisco 49ers. Birk announced his retirement on February 22, 2013.

He finished his career with the Ravens with two fumble recoveries and no fumbles.

== Post-NFL career ==
Birk was briefly the NFL director of football development. In 2019, he co-founded (with Tom Bengtson) a private Catholic high school, Unity Catholic High School, in Burnsville, Minnesota. He has also been involved in politics in the Minnesota Republican Party.

In February 2013, Birk, who has had three concussions since high school, announced his intentions to donate his brain to the Boston University School of Medicine for research into chronic traumatic encephalopathy.

== Political involvement ==
=== Anti-abortion and anti-same-sex-marriage activism ===
In 2012, Birk spoke out against same-sex marriage, filming a video in opposition to a new Maryland law legalizing same-sex marriage. The law was the subject of a Maryland ballot referendum (Question 6); voters upheld the law. Also in 2012, Birk wrote an op-ed, published in the Star Tribune, calling for passage of the Minnesota Marriage Amendment that would amend that state's constitution to prohibit gay marriage. Birk suggested that legal recognition of same-sex unions would harm "the broader well-being of children and the welfare of society." The same-sex marriage ban proposal was defeated in the fall election and same-sex marriage was legalized in Minnesota in 2013.

After the Ravens won Super Bowl XLVII, Birk chose not to attend the celebratory meeting with President Barack Obama, citing Obama's recent comments in support of Planned Parenthood as contrasting Birk's Catholic and anti-abortion views. In January 2018, Birk spoke at the 45th annual March for Life.

=== 2022 candidacy for lieutenant governor ===
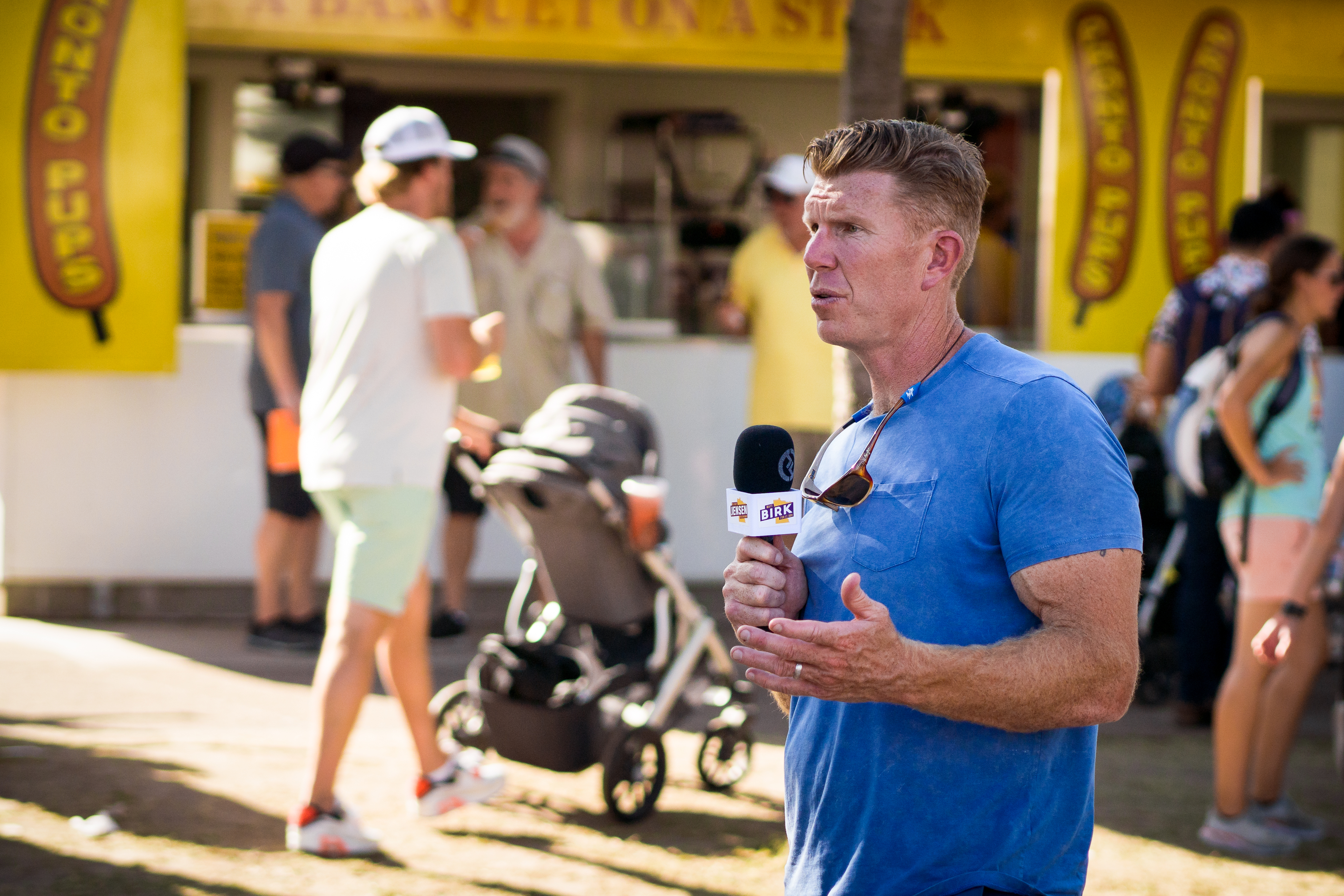
Birk campaigning at the 2022 Minnesota State Fair

In March 2022, Republican Scott Jensen announced Birk as his running mate in his gubernatorial campaign, challenging Governor Tim Walz and Lieutenant Governor Peggy Flanagan. In addition to being known as an outspoken conservative who opposes same-sex marriage, Birk also expressed skepticism of the government's response to the COVID-19 pandemic. The party endorsed the ticket in May 2022, with Birk's selection appealing to Republican base voters. Jensen and Birk generally trailed in surveys of Minnesota voters. Walz and Flanagan released copies of their tax returns ahead of the election, while Jensen and Birk declined to do so.

Following the U.S. Supreme Court decision overturning the landmark ruling of Roe v. Wade, Birk spoke at a June 2022 National Right To Life convention in Georgia where he compared legalized abortion to slavery, saying that proponents treat unborn children as the "property of the mother". Birk said in the same speech that American culture "loudly but also stealthily promotes" abortion by prioritizing women's careers over motherhood. He also criticized the termination of pregnancies resulting from rape, saying that abortion would not heal those wounds. His comments were criticized by Flanagan (who said that Birk "does not trust or respect women"), as well as others.

As a candidate, Birk had a "flashy and combative" style, which caused consternation among some fellow Minnesota Republicans. Birk personally attacked Minnesota Republican activist Michael Brodkorb (a critic of Birk) on Twitter, after Brodkorb highlighted a KSTP/SurveyUSA poll showing Walz ahead of Jensen by 18 percentage points. Birk played an atypically large role on the ticket, maintained his own campaign website, campaign material, and yard signs separate from Jensen's.

== Personal life ==
Birk was named the sixth-smartest athlete in 2010 by the Sporting News. He scored a 46 on the Wonderlic Test, the seventh-highest score in NFL history.

Birk is an anti-abortion activist. His wife, Adrianna, volunteers at a crisis pregnancy center and he participated in the Maryland March for Life in 2011. He is Catholic. The Birks have eight children.

=== Charity work ===
Birk established the HIKE Foundation in 2002, an educational nonprofit targeting at-risk Twin Cities' youth. Birk received the Walter Payton NFL Man of the Year Award in 2011 for his commitment to improving literacy among at-risk youth.

Party political offices
Preceded by Donna Bergstrom	Republican nominee for Lieutenant Governor of Minnesota; 2022	Succeeded by Ryan Wilson
