= Peggy Flanagan =

American politician and Ojibwe activist (born 1979)

- Gizhiiwewidamookwe
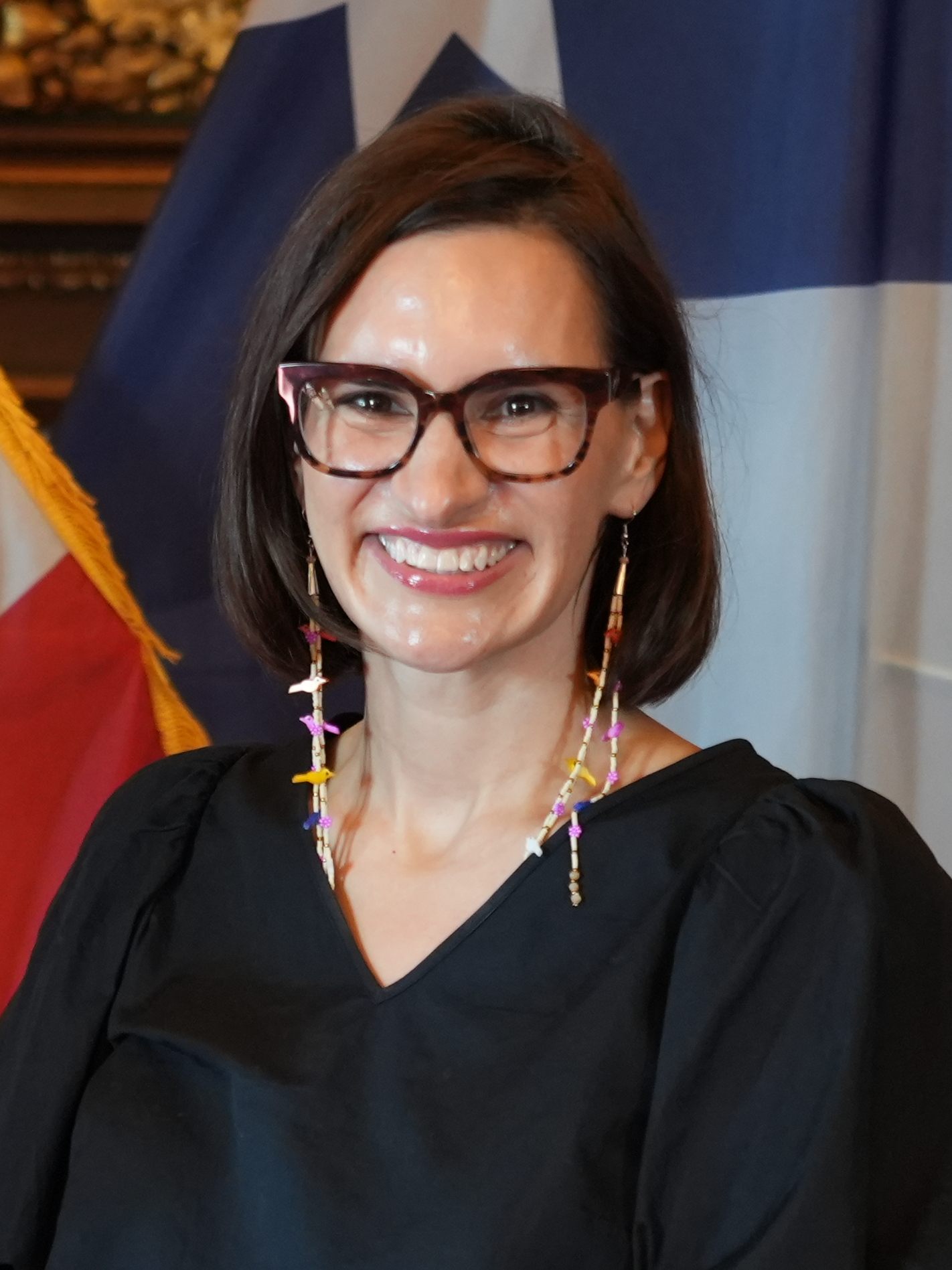
- Flanagan in 2024

United States Senator-elect from Minnesota
- Assuming office January 3, 2027
- Succeeding: Tina Smith

50th Lieutenant Governor of Minnesota
- Incumbent
- Assumed office January 7, 2019
- Governor: Tim Walz
- Preceded by: Michelle Fischbach

Member of the Minnesota House of Representatives from the 46A district
- In office November 9, 2015 – January 7, 2019
- Preceded by: Ryan Winkler
- Succeeded by: Ryan Winkler

Personal details
- Born: Margaret Ann Hartmann Flanagan; September 22, 1979 (age 47) St. Louis Park, Minnesota, U.S.
- Citizenship: United States; White Earth Nation
- Party: Democratic (DFL)
- Spouses: Tim Hellendrung (div. 2017); Thomas Weber (m. 2019)
- Children: 1
- Education: University of Minnesota (BA)
- Website: Official website Campaign website

Margaret Ann Hartmann Flanagan (Note: Ojibwe: Gizhiiwewidamookwe pronounced [gɪʒiːweːwɪdamoːkweː] lit. 'speaks with a clear and loud voice woman') (born September 22, 1979) is an American politician and Ojibwe activist who is a United States senator-elect from Minnesota. She has served since 2019 as the 50th lieutenant governor of Minnesota. A member of the Minnesota Democratic–Farmer–Labor Party (DFL), Flanagan served in the Minnesota House of Representatives from 2015 to 2019. In 2026, Flanagan and Mary Peltola of Alaska became the first Native American women elected to the Senate in U.S. history.

Flanagan grew up in St. Louis Park, Minnesota, an inner-ring suburb of Minneapolis. She is a citizen of the White Earth Nation. She started her political career as an organizer for the urban Native American community. From 2005 to 2009, Flanagan served as an elected member of the Minneapolis Public Schools Board. In 2015, she was elected to the Minnesota House, representing a section of Minneapolis's western inner-ring suburbs.

In 2018, Flanagan was elected lieutenant governor as Tim Walz's running mate. They were reelected in 2022. As of 2020, Walz described Flanagan as his top advisor. Flanagan is the first woman of color elected to statewide office in Minnesota and at the time of her election, she was the highest-ranking Native American woman to hold elected executive office in the country.

A progressive, Flanagan has advocated for Medicare for All, abolishing and replacing ICE, blocking military aid and arms sales to Israel, and for universal childcare. On February 13, 2025, Flanagan announced her candidacy for the 2026 United States Senate election in Minnesota. She won the DFL nomination on August 11, 2026, and defeated Republican nominee Michele Tafoya in the general election on November 3, 2026.

== Early life and education ==
Flanagan was born on September 22, 1979, in St. Louis Park, Minnesota, where she was raised by her mother, Patricia Elizabeth Flanagan, a lifelong activist for the Minnesota Democratic–Farmer–Labor Party (DFL) who had worked for Hubert Humphrey. Her father was Marvin Manypenny, an American Indian land rights and sovereignty activist. Flanagan has described growing up in a single-parent household that relied at times on public assistance, including food assistance, Medicaid, child-care aid and a Section 8 housing voucher. She is of Irish and Ojibwe descent and is a citizen of the White Earth Nation. Flanagan is a graduate of St. Louis Park High School and received a bachelor's degree in child psychology, with a minor in American Indian studies, from the University of Minnesota in 2002.

Flanagan joined the collegiate women's fraternity Alpha Chi Omega while an undergraduate student at the University of Minnesota. She was a member of its Alpha Lambda chapter.

== Early political career ==
While in college, Flanagan worked on U.S. Senator Paul Wellstone's campaign, eventually becoming an organizer for the urban Native American community. After college, she worked for the Minnesota Council of Churches, performing outreach work between Native American families and the Minneapolis public school system. Flanagan later said that her work helping Native families navigate the school system led her to look for a school-board candidate from the community and, after struggling to recruit one, to run herself.

In her first run for elective office, Flanagan won a seat on the board of Minneapolis Public Schools in 2004. In a six-candidate field that featured two incumbents, the political newcomer Flanagan received the most votes. She served from 2005 to 2009. In 2008, she challenged incumbent Minnesota Representative Joe Mullery in the Democratic primary, but dropped out of the race due to her mother's health problems. After working other jobs, Flanagan joined Wellstone Action as a trainer of activists, organizers, and candidates. She was then appointed to serve on the school board from 2010 until 2011. As executive director of Children's Defense Fund-Minnesota, she also advocated for the successful 2014 effort to raise Minnesota's minimum wage.

== Minnesota House of Representatives ==
Flanagan was elected to the Minnesota House of Representatives unopposed in a special election on November 3, 2015, and sworn in on November 9. Susan Allen (Rosebud) and Republican Steve Green (White Earth Ojibwe) were the only other Natives in the Minnesota State House at that time.

Three other Native women sought election to the Minnesota legislature in November 2016: Mary Kelly Kunesh-Podein (Standing Rock Lakota) and Jamie Becker-Finn (Leech Lake Band of Ojibwe) ran for state representative seats and Chilah Brown (Mille Lacs Band of Ojibwe) ran for the Minnesota Senate. Kunesh-Podein and Becker-Finn were elected to the Minnesota House of Representatives and took office in January 2017.

In 2017, Flanagan, Allen, Kunesh-Podein and Becker-Finn formed the Minnesota House Native American Caucus to represent issues of both urban and rural Native Americans and their other constituents. During the 2017–2018 legislative session, she served on the House Health and Human Services Reform Committee and its Subcommittee on Childcare Access and Affordability. In 2018, she co-authored legislation to create a state task force on missing and murdered Indigenous women. The proposal received bipartisan support in committee.

=== 2016 Democratic National Convention ===
Flanagan was invited to address the 2016 Democratic National Convention on July 28, 2016. She was the second Native American woman to address the DNC, after Denise Juneau in 2012. Her remarks were framed as a letter to her three-year-old daughter, Siobhan, and focused on the country she hoped her daughter would grow up in.

== Lieutenant governor of Minnesota ==
Flanagan has served since 2019 as lieutenant governor of Minnesota, with Tim Walz as governor. They had a close working relationship at least until Walz's 2024 vice-presidential bid.

=== Elections ===
In 2017, Flanagan became a candidate for lieutenant governor, after being picked by then-Congressman Tim Walz, who won the DFL primary in the 2018 Minnesota gubernatorial election. In the general election, the ticket of Walz and Flanagan defeated the Republican nominees, Jeff Johnson and Donna Bergstrom. Walz and Flanagan were reelected in 2022.

During her tenure, Flanagan worked on paid family and medical leave, free school meals, the state child tax credit, housing, and child care. In 2019, she advocated for a $100 monthly increase in Minnesota Family Investment Program cash assistance, the program's first increase in 33 years. After visiting the Minnesota Correctional Facility – Shakopee with Representative Becker-Finn in 2019 and hearing from incarcerated mothers about separation from newborns, Flanagan advocated for legislation that became the 2021 Healthy Start Act, allowing eligible pregnant or postpartum incarcerated people to serve part of their sentences in community alternatives with their infants. She chairs the Minnesota Interagency Council on Homelessness and has worked on the administration's housing-stability initiatives.

=== 2024 Democratic National Convention ===
Flanagan was one of four chairs of the 2024 Democratic National Convention in Chicago. She also addressed the convention on its opening night, introducing herself by her Ojibwe name, Gizhiiwewidamookwe.

=== Democratic Lieutenant Governors Association chair ===
In 2023, Flanagan was elected as the chair of the Democratic Lieutenant Governors Association; this made her the first Native American woman elected to lead any national political party committee.

== 2026 U.S. Senate campaign ==
Flanagan campaigning in 2026

In February 2025, after U.S. Senator Tina Smith announced that she would not seek reelection, Flanagan announced her candidacy for Smith's seat in the 2026 United States Senate election in Minnesota. U.S. Representative Angie Craig entered the race in April 2025 and became Flanagan's principal opponent for the DFL nomination.

On May 30, 2026, Flanagan won the DFL endorsement for the Senate race at the party's state convention in Rochester; Craig had chosen to bypass the endorsement process and compete in the primary. Flanagan was endorsed by Smith, U.S. Senators Bernie Sanders and Elizabeth Warren, and U.S. Representative Ilhan Omar, among other elected officials. Sanders endorsed Flanagan in November 2025 and campaigned with her at a July 2026 rally at First Avenue in Minneapolis.

The primary between Flanagan and Craig was widely described as a contest between the progressive and moderate wings of the Democratic Party. Immigration and ICE enforcement, U.S. policy toward Israel, the role of corporate and wealthy donors, and outside spending were among the issues that featured prominently in the race. Flanagan was declared the winner of the Democratic primary on August 11.

On November 3, 2026, Flanagan defeated Republican nominee Michele Tafoya in the general election; she and Mary Peltola were the first Native American women elected to the Senate.

== Political positions ==
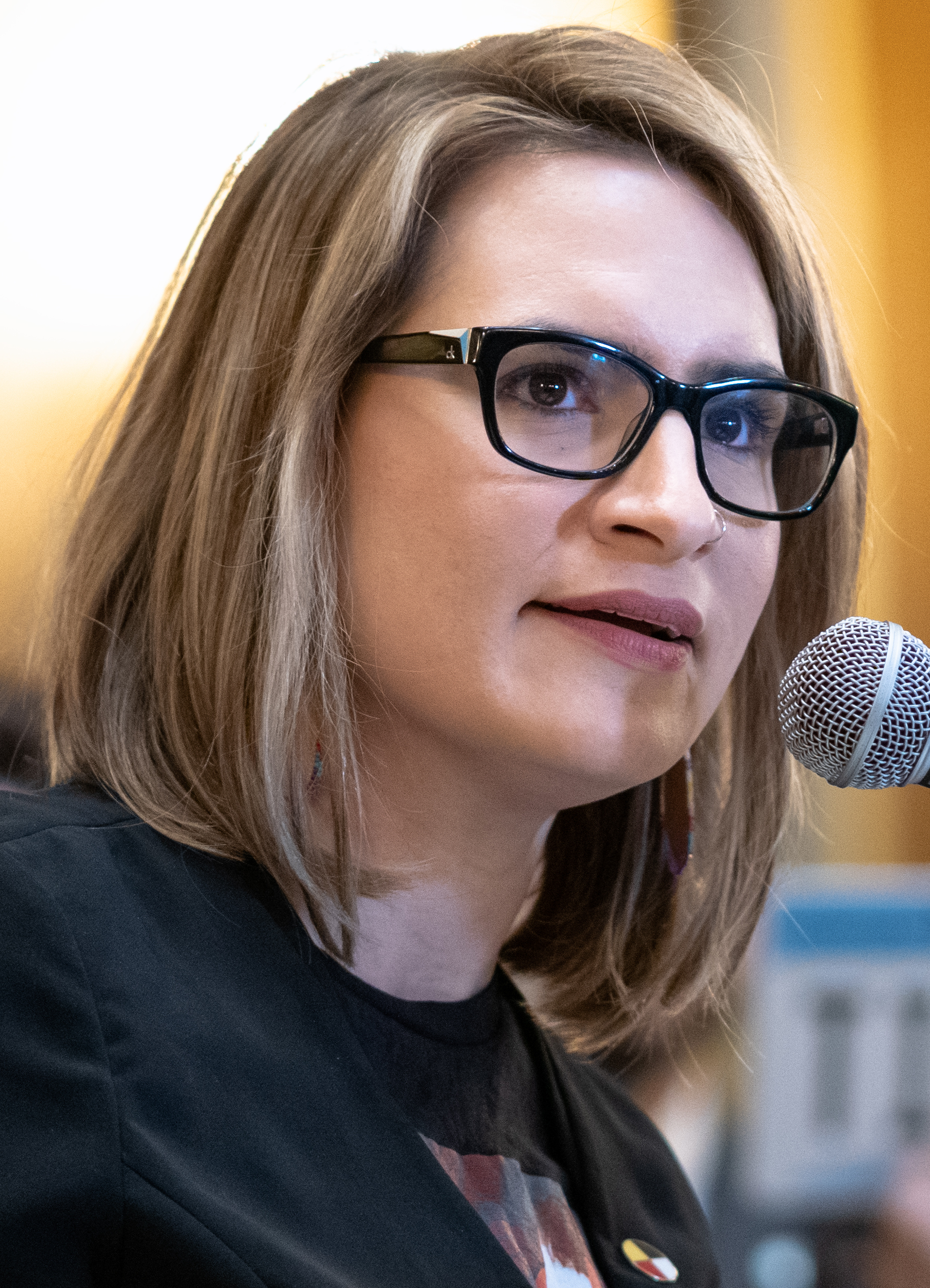
Flanagan in 2019

Flanagan is a progressive Democrat. Flanagan supports a two-state solution to the Israeli-Palestinian conflict, has described Israel's conduct in the Gaza war as genocide, and said she would have supported reductions in U.S. military aid to Israel and Senate resolutions blocking weapons sales to Israel. Flanagan supports universal health care through Medicare for All. She has also advocated for the expansion of existing Medicare to cover services such as dental, hearing, and vision, the regulation of insurance company practices regarding prior authorizations, and government negotiation of prescription drug prices. Her platform also includes initiatives to increase funding for maternal and mental healthcare services. As lieutenant governor, Flanagan promoted culturally specific addiction treatment and tribal recovery services as part of the Walz administration's response to the opioid crisis.

Flanagan condemned the killing of Renée Good by an ICE agent amid Trump's mass deportation campaign. She said she supports a "complete and total overhaul" of ICE and criticized her Democratic primary opponent Angie Craig for being "politically expedient" by voting for the Laken Riley Act and a resolution expressing gratitude to ICE agents. Flanagan has also expressed that ICE is beyond reform, saying it needs to be "ripped apart" and a better immigration system built from scratch. She described her preferred approach as "dismantling" the agency and rebuilding immigration enforcement, stopping short of using the term "abolish".

Flanagan is an advocate for Indigenous peoples' rights. While a legislator, she co-authored legislation to create a task force on Missing and Murdered Indigenous Women. Later, she sponsored a mandate for tribal consultation in state affairs, and as lieutenant governor she helped establish the nation's first dedicated state-level Missing and Murdered Indigenous Relatives Office. The office was established in 2021, and the Walz-Flanagan administration also expanded formal government-to-government consultation between state agencies and Minnesota's tribal nations. Flanagan also supported the redesign of Minnesota's state flag and seal, whose former imagery had long been criticized by Native Americans; after the State Emblems Redesign Commission selected new designs in December 2023, she said the change would better represent Minnesotans.

While a legislator, Flanagan authored several bills for employer-provided childcare and state-sponsored childcare assistance. During her 2026 Senate campaign, she also supported universal childcare and a federal minimum wage of at least $17 an hour. Flanagan supports transgender rights and providing gender-affirming care to transgender youth. She supported Walz's executive order protecting access to gender-affirming care for adults and youth.

Flanagan called the 2026 Iran war an "illegal war" that must end and said it "caused gas prices to skyrocket". She also said she would support Chris Van Hollen for Senate Majority Leader.

== Personal life ==
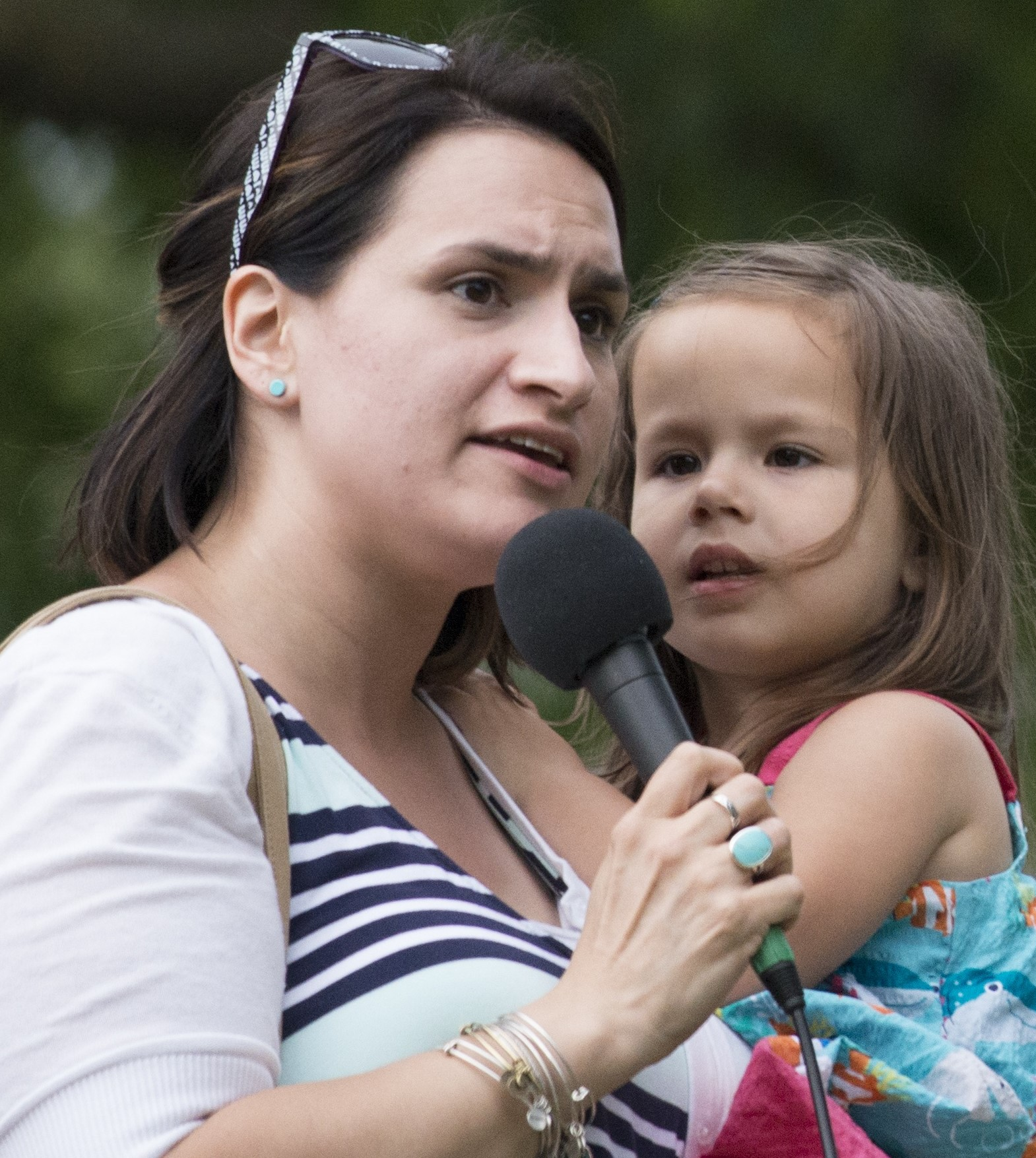
Flanagan with her daughter in 2016

Flanagan has a daughter with her former husband, Tim Hellendrung. The marriage ended in 2017. She resides in St. Louis Park, Minnesota. Flanagan is Roman Catholic and attends the Church of the Ascension in North Minneapolis.

On January 12, 2018, Flanagan announced on her personal Facebook page that she was in a relationship with the Minnesota Public Radio News host Tom Weber; MPR News announced that day that it would reassign Weber to no longer cover "the governor's race, the Legislature, potential legislation, public policy involving the executive or legislative branches or any topic related to the November 2018 election." Flanagan married Weber in September 2019.

Flanagan's brother, Ron Golden, died of COVID-19 on March 21, 2020. His death was the second one caused by the COVID-19 pandemic in Tennessee.

=== Awards ===
In February 2020, the National Congress of American Indians gave Flanagan the Native American Leadership Award for her work raising awareness of Native issues and improving lives of Indigenous people. In 2024, Flanagan received the Joan and Walter Mondale Award for Public Service at the Humphrey–Mondale Awards.

== Electoral history ==
2026 United States Senate election in Minnesota
Party	Candidate	Votes	%	±%
Democratic (DFL)	Peggy Flanagan	1,520,871	53.70	+4.96%
Republican	Michele Tafoya	1,233,476	43.56	+0.06%
Independent	Marisa Simonetti	41,574	1.47	N/A
Libertarian	Rebecca Whiting	32,493	1.15	N/A
Write-in		3,381	0.12	+0.07%

2022 Minnesota gubernatorial election
Party	Candidate	Votes	%	±%
Democratic (DFL)	Tim Walz/Peggy Flanagan (incumbent)	1,312,349	52.27%	−1.57%
Republican	Scott Jensen/Matt Birk	1,119,941	44.61%	+2.18%
Legal Marijuana Now	James McCaskel/David Sandbeck	29,346	1.17%	N/A
Grassroots—LC	Steve Patterson/Matt Huff	22,599	0.90%	−1.75%
Independence	Hugh McTavish/Mike Winter	18,156	0.72%	N/A
Socialist Workers	Gabrielle M. Prosser/Kevin A. Dwire	7,241	0.29%	N/A
Write-in		1,029	0.04%	0.00%

2018 Minnesota gubernatorial election
Party	Candidate	Votes	%	±%
Democratic (DFL)	Tim Walz/Peggy Flanagan	1,393,096	53.84%	+3.77%
Republican	Jeff Johnson/Donna Bergstrom	1,097,705	42.43%	−2.08%
Grassroots	Chris Wright/Judith Schwartzbacker	68,667	2.65%	n/a
Libertarian	Josh Welter/Mary O'Connor	26,735	1.03%	n/a
	Write-In	1,084	0.04%	n/a
Majority		295,391	11.41%	

2016 Minnesota State Representative district 46A election
Party	Candidate	Votes	%
Democratic (DFL)	Peggy Flanagan	15,187	63.85%
Republican	Anne Taylor	8,525	35.84%
	Write-In	72	0.30%
Majority		6,662	28.01%

Nov. 3, 2015, Minnesota State Representative district 46A special election
Party	Candidate	Votes	%
Democratic (DFL)	Peggy Flanagan	3,137	96.40%
	Write-In	117	3.60%

2004 Minneapolis School Board Election (elect 3)
Party	Candidate	Votes	%
Non-partisan	Peggy Flanagan	71,907	23.72%
Non-partisan	Lydia Lee	68,694	22.66%
Non-partisan	Sharon Henry-Blythe (i)	44,759	14.76%
Non-partisan	Dennis Schapiro (i)	42,739	14.10%
Non-partisan	Sandra Miller	42,638	14.06%
Non-partisan	David Dayhoff	30,367	10.02%
	Write-in	2,094	0.69%

== See also ==
- Demographics of the Democratic Party (United States) — Native Americans
- List of minority governors and lieutenant governors in the United States
- List of Native American politicians
- Native American women in politics
- Women in the United States Senate

== Notes ==
Party political offices
Preceded by Tina Smith	Democratic nominee for Lieutenant Governor of Minnesota; 2018, 2022	Succeeded by Ben Schierer
Preceded by Tina Smith	Democratic nominee for U.S. Senator from Minnesota (Class 2); 2026	Most recent
Political offices
Preceded by Michelle Fischbach	Lieutenant Governor of Minnesota; 2019–present	Incumbent
U.S. Senate
Preceded by Tina Smith	U.S. Senator (Class 2) from Minnesota; Taking office 2027; Served alongside: Amy Klobuchar, TBD	Elect
