= Republican Lieutenant Governors Association =

American campaigning organization

The Republican Lieutenant Governors Association (RLGA) is a national organization in the U.S. whose mission is raising money and assisting Republicans in their campaigns for lieutenant governor.

== See also ==
- National Lieutenant Governors Association
- Republican Governors Association
