= 2022 Minnesota gubernatorial election =

- November 8, 2022
- Turnout: 61.0% (▼2.6 pp)
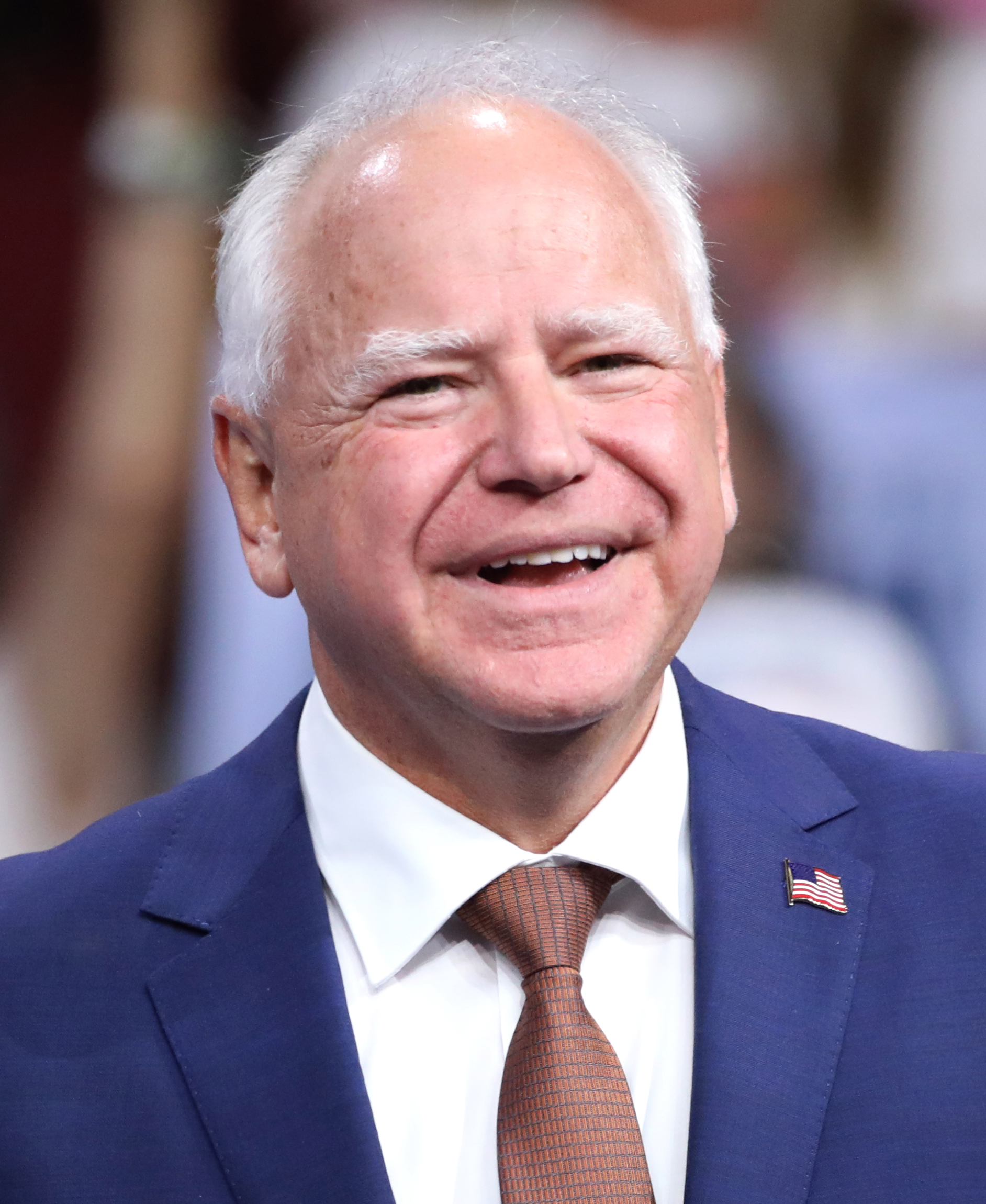

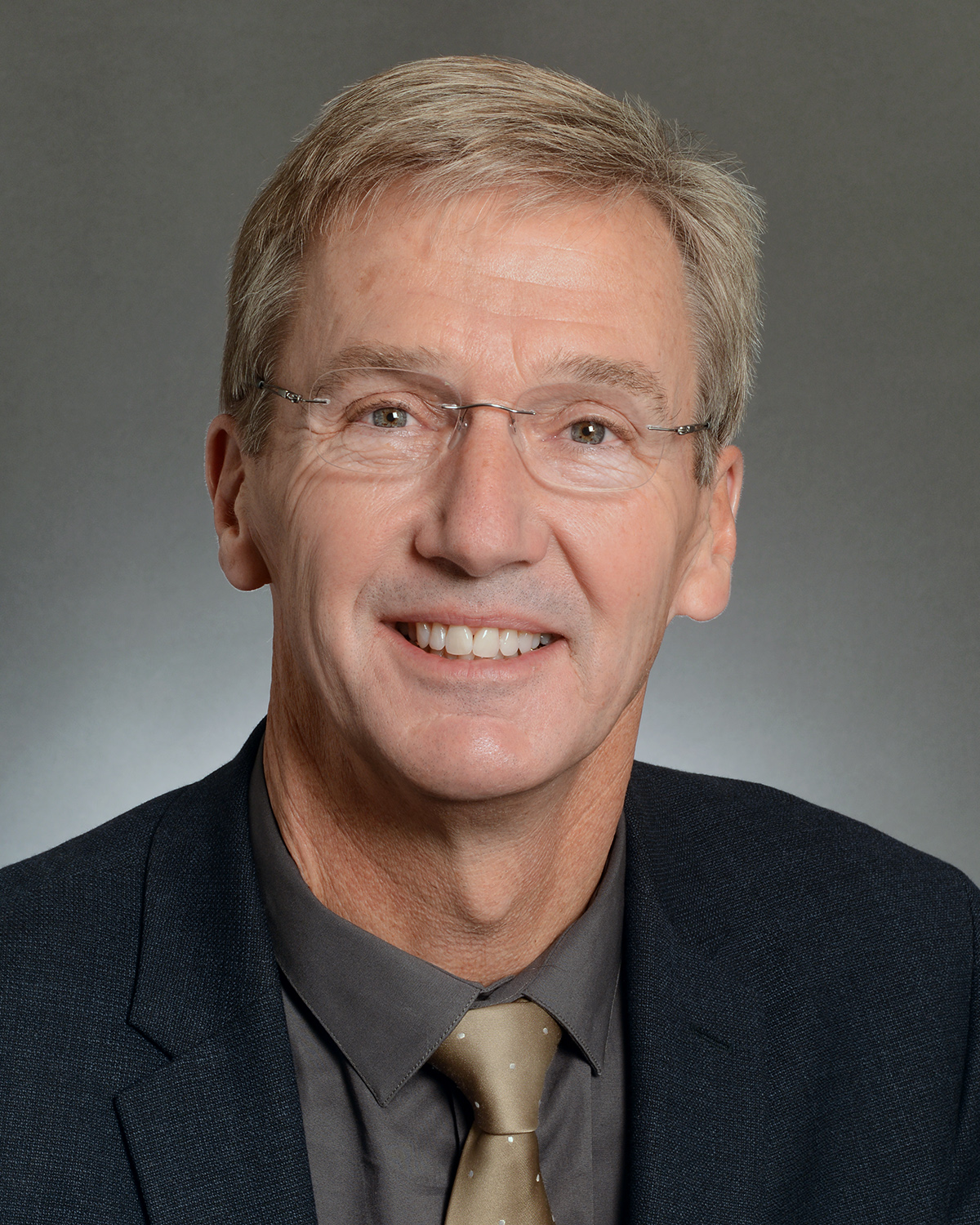
Nominee	Tim Walz	Scott Jensen
Party	Democratic (DFL)	Republican
Running mate	Peggy Flanagan	Matt Birk
Popular vote	1,312,349	1,119,941
Percentage	52.27%	44.61%
- Walz: 40–50% 50–60% 60–70% 70–80% 80–90% >90% Jensen: 30–40% 40–50% 50–60% 60–70% 70–80% 80–90% >90% Tie: 50% No votes
Governor before election
Tim Walz
Democratic (DFL)
Elected Governor
Tim Walz
Democratic (DFL)

The 2022 Minnesota gubernatorial election took place on November 8, 2022, to elect the governor of Minnesota. Incumbent Democratic (DFL) Governor Tim Walz defeated the Republican nominee, physician and former state senator Scott Jensen, winning a second term.

Jensen's advantage in rural Greater Minnesota could not overcome Walz's large lead in the Twin Cities metropolitan area. Walz won the election by a comfortable 7.7% margin, narrowly larger than Biden's 7.1% margin in 2020 but smaller than his own previous record of 11.4%. With his win, Walz gave the Minnesota Democratic–Farmer–Labor Party its fourth consecutive gubernatorial victory, the most in the party's history. Republicans carried Freeborn and Mower counties for the first time since 2002; Beltrami, Koochiching, and Mahnomen counties since 1998; and Norman County since 1994 (although it was tied in 2018).

Furthermore, the DFL held the state house and flipped the state senate, gaining a trifecta for the first time since 2012.

== Democratic–Farmer–Labor primary ==
=== Candidates ===
==== Nominee ====
- Tim Walz, incumbent governor and former U.S. representative for Minnesota's 1st congressional district (2007–2019)
  - Peggy Flanagan, incumbent lieutenant governor

==== Eliminated in primary ====
- Ole Savior, perennial candidate
  - Julia M. Parker

=== Results ===
Results by county: Walz: 80–90%; 90–100%

Democratic–Farmer–Labor primary results
Party	Candidate	Votes	%
Democratic (DFL)	Tim Walz (incumbent)	416,973	96.54%
Democratic (DFL)	Ole Savior	14,950	3.46%
Total votes		431,923	100.0%

== Republican primary ==
=== Candidates ===
==== Nominee ====
- Scott Jensen, family medicine physician and former state senator
  - Matt Birk, former professional football player with the Minnesota Vikings, businessman, and author

==== Eliminated in primary ====
- Bob "Again" Carney Jr., candidate for U.S. Senate in 2020
  - Captain Jack Sparrow, perennial candidate
- Joyce Lynne Lacey
  - Kent Edwards

==== Withdrawn ====
- Michelle Benson, state senator
- Thomas Evensted, activist
- Paul Gazelka, state senator and former majority leader of the Minnesota Senate
- Mike Marti, businessman
- Mike Murphy, mayor of Lexington
- Kendall Qualls, Army veteran, businessman, and nominee for Minnesota's 3rd congressional district in 2020
- Neil Shah, physician and business owner
- Rich Stanek, former Hennepin County sheriff

==== Declined ====
- Rob Barrett, businessman, activist and candidate for the U.S. Senate in 2020
- Matt Birk, former Minnesota Vikings player (endorsed Jensen and became his running mate)
- Jennifer Carnahan, former chair of the Minnesota Republican Party (2017–2021) and widow of U.S. Representative Jim Hagedorn (unsuccessfully ran for Congress in a 2022 special election)
- Karin Housley, state senator and nominee for the U.S. Senate in 2018 (ran for reelection)
- Mike Lindell, inventor of My Pillow, businessman
- Carla Nelson, state senator (ran for reelection)
- Pete Stauber, U.S. representative for Minnesota's 8th congressional district (ran for reelection)

=== Caucuses and conventions ===
==== Caucus ====
The caucuses took place on February 1, 2022. A caucus is a local meeting where all who intend to vote for the Republican Party are able to select their precinct leadership, participate in a straw poll for governor, write and pass resolutions, and elect delegates to their local Basic Political Organizational Unit (BPOU). Those who were not elected BPOU delegates could become alternates and fill in for delegates who cannot attend the BPOU convention.

==== BPOU conventions ====
A BPOU has boundaries based on the county or state senate district a voter resides in. The majority of these took place in March 2022. Elected delegates of each BPOU attended a convention relating to their district to vote on the resolutions passed at the caucus, complete party business, listen to candidates, and elect delegates to the state convention and their corresponding U.S. House District convention.

==== State convention ====
The Republican State Convention was held on May 13–14, 2022, in Rochester. 2,200 delegates were elected statewide to decide the Minnesota Republican Party's endorsement in all statewide offices. The endorsed candidate receives the party's backing, including money and resources, ahead of the August 9 primary. Only one Republican, incumbent governor Arne Carlson in 1994, has won the primary without the party's endorsement. (Two Democrats, Mark Dayton and Tim Walz, won the Democratic primary against endorsed candidates.)

At the convention, Scott Jensen won the endorsement with 65% of the vote on the ninth ballot, defeating Kendall Qualls. Mike Murphy, Paul Gazelka, and Neil Shah were eliminated on earlier ballots. All the candidates who contested the endorsement pledged to forego the primary if not endorsed.

Qualls soon honored his pledge by announcing his plans to "return to private life." Rich Stanek, the only major candidate who did not compete for the endorsement, did not file for the primary, leaving Jensen without major opposition. He faced two minor candidates in the August primary.

=== Endorsements ===
Scott Jensen

Newspapers

- Dassel-Cokato Enterprise Dispatch
- Delano Herald-Journal
- Winsted Herald-Journal

Organizations

- Stand for Health Freedom

=== Results ===
Results by county: Jensen: 70–80%; 80–90%; 90–100%

Republican primary results
Party	Candidate	Votes	%
Republican	Scott Jensen	288,499	89.31%
Republican	Joyce Lynne Lacey	21,308	6.60%
Republican	Bob "Again" Carney Jr.	13,213	4.09%
Total votes		323,020	100.0%

== Independents and others ==
=== Grassroots–Legalize Cannabis primary ===
==== Candidates ====
===== Nominee =====
- Steve Patterson, anti-lockdown activist
  - Matt Huff

===== Eliminated in primary =====
- Darrell Paulsen, business consultant, nominee for lieutenant governor in 1998
  - Edwin Engelmann, nominee for lieutenant governor in 2010

==== Results ====
Results by county: Patterson: 50–60%; 60–70%; 70–80%; 80–90%; 90–100%; Paulsen: 50–60%; 60–70%; 70–80%; 80–90%; 90–100%; Tie: 50%; No votes

Grassroots–Legalize Cannabis primary results
Party	Candidate	Votes	%
Grassroots—LC	Steve Patterson	1,003	59.14%
Grassroots—LC	Darrell Paulsen	693	40.86%
Total votes		1,696	100.00%

=== Legal Marijuana Now primary ===
==== Candidates ====
===== Nominee =====
- James McCaskel, community organizer and BLM activist
  - David Sandbeck, activist and candidate for Minnesota's 4th congressional district in 2020

===== Eliminated in primary =====
- Chris Wright, perennial candidate
  - L.C. Lawrence Converse

==== Results ====
Results by county: McCaskel: 50–60%; 60–70%; 70–80%; 80–90%; 90–100%; Wright: 50–60%; 60–70%; 70–80%; 80–90%; 90–100%; Tie: 50%; No votes

Legal Marijuana Now primary results
Party	Candidate	Votes	%
Legal Marijuana Now	James McCaskel	1,461	51.86%
Legal Marijuana Now	Chris Wright	1,356	48.14%
Total votes		2,817	100.0%

=== Other parties ===
- Gabrielle M. Prosser, restaurant worker (Socialist Workers)
  - Kevin A. Dwire, perennial candidate
- Hugh McTavish, scientist, entrepreneur and author (Independence-Alliance Party)
  - Mike Winter, commercial driver, podcast host, Teamster Union steward and candidate for mayor of Minneapolis in 2021

==== Withdrew ====
- Cory Hepola, former WCCO radio host (Forward Party)
  - Tamara Uselman, school administrator
- Brandon Millholland-Corcoran

==== Declined ====
- Tom Bakk, state senator and DFL candidate for governor in 2010
- Christopher Chamberlin, candidate for governor, senate, and house in 2018
- Richard Painter, University of Minnesota Law School professor, former chief White House ethics lawyer, and DFL candidate for U.S. Senate in 2018 (ran for Congress)

=== Endorsements ===
Cory Hepola (withdrew)

Organizations

- Forward Party

== General election ==
=== Campaign ===
The election's central issues were the economy, rising crime, Walz's response to the COVID-19 pandemic, education, and abortion access following the Supreme Court decision overturning Roe v. Wade.

Walz campaigned on his first-term accomplishments, such as middle-class tax cuts, while making abortion rights a prominent focus of the campaign and attacking Jensen on abortion and his COVID-19 skepticism. Jensen attacked Walz over his COVID-19 policies, crime in the Twin Cities, inflation and gas prices, and education performance.

Jensen was criticized for promoting the hoax that schools provided litter boxes to students who identify as furries.

=== Debates ===
2022 Minnesota gubernatorial election debates
No.	Date	Host	Moderator	Link	Republican	DFL
Key: P Participant A Absent N Non-invitee I Invitee W Withdrawn						
Key: P Participant A Absent N Non-invitee I Invitee W Withdrawn					Scott Jensen	Tim Walz
1	August 3, 2022	Minnesota Farmfest	Blois Olson		P	P
2	October 18, 2022	KTTC/Gray Television	Caitlin Alexander, Justin Betti, Stacy Steinhagen, Dan Wolfe		P	P
3	October 23, 2022	KSTP/Hubbard Broadcasting	Lindsey Brown, Tom Hauser, Laura Lee, Peter Callaghan		P	A
4	October 28, 2022	Minnesota Public Radio	Mike Mulcahy		P	P
5	November 4, 2022	Twin Cities PBS - Almanac	Eric Eskola, Cathy Wurzer		P	A

=== Predictions ===
Source	Ranking	As of
The Cook Political Report	Likely D	March 4, 2022
Inside Elections	Lean D	November 3, 2022
Sabato's Crystal Ball	Likely D	October 12, 2022
Politico	Lean D	April 1, 2022
RCP	Tossup	June 10, 2022
Fox News	Lean D	May 12, 2022
538	Likely D	October 17, 2022
Elections Daily	Likely D	November 7, 2022

=== Endorsements ===
Tim Walz (DFL)

Executive branch officials

- Kamala Harris, 49th vice president of the United States
- Barack Obama, 44th president of the United States

U.S. senators

- Amy Klobuchar, U.S. senator from Minnesota
- Tina Smith, U.S. senator from Minnesota

Statewide officials

- J. B. Pritzker, governor of Illinois
- Jesse Ventura, former governor of Minnesota (Independent)

Newspapers

- Star Tribune

Organizations

- AFSCME Council 5
- Communications Workers of America
- Education Minnesota
- Everytown for Gun Safety
- Feminist Majority PAC
- Giffords
- Human Rights Campaign
- Inter Faculty Organization
- IUOE Local 49
- LIUNA Minnesota
- Minnesota AFL–CIO
- Minnesota Association of Professional Employees
- Minnesota Democratic–Farmer–Labor Party
- Minnesota Medical Association
- Minnesota Nurses Association
- National Education Association
- Planned Parenthood Action Fund
- SEIU Minnesota
- VoteVets.org
Scott Jensen (R)

Executive branch officials

- Donald Trump, 45th president of the United States

U.S. senators

- Kevin Cramer, U.S. senator from North Dakota

Statewide officials

- Kim Reynolds, governor of Iowa

Newspapers

- Post-Bulletin

Organizations

- Minnesota Police and Peace Officers Association
- National Federation of Independent Business - Minnesota
- NRA Political Victory Fund
- Republican Party of Minnesota

=== Polling ===
Aggregate polls

Source of poll aggregation	Dates administered	Dates updated	Tim Walz (DFL)	Scott Jensen (R)	Other/ Undecided (Note: Calculated by taking the difference of 100% and all other candidates combined.)	Margin
RealClearPolitics	October 10–30, 2022	November 1, 2022	48.0%	43.7%	8.3%	Walz +4.3%
FiveThirtyEight	September 24 – October 30, 2022	November 4, 2022	49.7%	40.9%	9.4%	Walz +8.8%
Average			48.9%	42.3%	8.8%	Walz +6.6%

Poll source	Date(s) administered	Sample size (Note: Key: A – all adults RV – registered voters LV – likely voters V – unclear)	Margin of error	Tim Walz (DFL)	Scott Jensen (R)	Hugh McTavish (I-A)	Other	Undecided
SurveyUSA (Note: This poll was sponsored by KSTP-TV)	Oct. 26–30, 2022	836 (LV)	± 3.9%	51%	43%	–	2%	4%
St. Cloud State University	Oct. 10–30, 2022	235 (A)	± 8%	56%	40%	–	4%	–
Trafalgar Group (R)	Oct. 17–19, 2022	1,091 (LV)	± 2.9%	45.8%	46.3%	1.4%	2.5% (Note: McCaskel with 1.2%, Patterson with 0.9%, and Prosser with 0.4%)	3.9%
Embold Research (Note: This poll was sponsored by MinnPost)	Oct. 10–14, 2022	1,585 (LV)	± 2.6%	47.0%	42.4%	1.3%	3.3% (Note: McCaskel (LMN) with 1.4%, Prosser (SW) with 1.0%, and Patterson (GLC) with 0.9%)	6.0%
SurveyUSA	Sep. 30 – Oct. 3, 2022	604 (LV)	± 4.4%	50%	40%	–	4%	7%
Cygnal (R) (Note: This poll was sponsored by Jensen's campaign)	Sep. 24–26, 2022	600 (LV)	± 4.0%	47.6%	44.2%	0.4%	3.0% (Note: McCaskel (LMN) with 1.2%, Prosser (SW) with 1.2%, and Patterson (GLC) with 0.6%)	4.8%
Trafalgar Group (R)	Sep. 14, 2022	1,079 (LV)	± 2.9%	47.7%	45.0%	0.8%	1.7% (Note: McCaskel with 1.4%, Patterson with 0.2%, and Prosser with 0.1%)	4.9%
Mason-Dixon	Sep. 12–14, 2022	800 (LV)	± 3.5%	48.0%	41.0%	–	0.8%	10.3%
SurveyUSA	Aug. 30 – Sep. 4, 2022	562 (LV)	± 4.9%	51%	33%	–	4%	12%
Gravis Marketing (I-A) (Note: This poll was sponsored by McTavish's campaign)	Aug. 17–19, 2022	510 (LV)	± 4.3%	53%	36%	6%	5%	–
Cygnal (R)	Jul. 18–19, 2022	500 (LV)	± 4.3%	49.8%	45.6%	–	–	4.7%
Change Research	Jun. 3–8, 2022	1,551 (LV)	± 2.6%	41.8%	39.8%	2.7%	6.6% (Note: "The candidate from either one of the legalize marijuana parties (Legal Marijuana Now or Grassroots Legalize Cannabis)")	9.0%
SurveyUSA	May 5–10, 2022	513 (LV)	± 4.9%	44%	39%	–	4%	13%
SurveyUSA	Jan. 25–30, 2022	501 (LV)	± 5.7%	43%	40%	–	4%	13%
SurveyUSA	Dec. 2–6, 2021	506 (LV)	± 5.1%	48%	36%	–	5%	11%

Hypothetical polling

Tim Walz vs. Michelle Benson

Poll source	Date(s) administered	Sample size	Margin of error	Tim Walz (DFL)	Michelle Benson (R)	Other	Undecided
SurveyUSA	January 25–30, 2022	501 (LV)	± 5.7%	45%	37%	8%	10%
SurveyUSA	December 2–6, 2021	506 (LV)	± 5.1%	47%	35%	4%	14%

Tim Walz vs. Paul Gazelka

Poll source	Date(s) administered	Sample size	Margin of error	Tim Walz (DFL)	Paul Gazelka (R)	Other	Undecided
SurveyUSA	May 5–10, 2022	513 (LV)	± 4.9%	43%	36%	7%	15%
SurveyUSA	January 25–30, 2022	501 (LV)	± 5.7%	42%	37%	6%	15%
SurveyUSA	December 2–6, 2021	506 (LV)	± 5.1%	47%	34%	5%	14%

Tim Walz vs. Mike Marti

Poll source	Date(s) administered	Sample size	Margin of error	Tim Walz (DFL)	Mike Marti (R)	Other	Undecided
SurveyUSA	December 2–6, 2021	506 (LV)	± 5.1%	47%	34%	3%	15%

Tim Walz vs. Mike Murphy

Poll source	Date(s) administered	Sample size	Margin of error	Tim Walz (DFL)	Mike Murphy (R)	Other	Undecided
SurveyUSA	May 5–10, 2022	513 (LV)	± 4.9%	45%	35%	4%	15%
SurveyUSA	January 25–30, 2022	501 (LV)	± 5.7%	44%	35%	7%	14%
SurveyUSA	December 2–6, 2021	506 (LV)	± 5.1%	47%	36%	5%	12%

Tim Walz vs. Kendall Qualls

Poll source	Date(s) administered	Sample size	Margin of error	Tim Walz (DFL)	Kendall Qualls (R)	Other	Undecided
SurveyUSA	May 5–10, 2022	513 (LV)	± 4.9%	46%	34%	4%	15%
SurveyUSA	January 25–30, 2022	501 (LV)	± 5.7%	43%	35%	6%	16%

Tim Walz vs. Neil Shah

Poll source	Date(s) administered	Sample size	Margin of error	Tim Walz (DFL)	Neil Shah (R)	Other	Undecided
SurveyUSA	May 5–10, 2022	513 (LV)	± 4.9%	44%	34%	6%	16%
SurveyUSA	January 25–30, 2022	501 (LV)	± 5.7%	45%	34%	7%	14%
SurveyUSA	December 2–6, 2021	506 (LV)	± 5.1%	48%	31%	5%	16%

Tim Walz vs. Rich Stanek

Poll source	Date(s) administered	Sample size	Margin of error	Tim Walz (DFL)	Rich Stanek (R)	Other	Undecided
SurveyUSA	May 5–10, 2022	513 (LV)	± 4.9%	47%	37%	5%	11%

Tim Walz vs. generic Republican

Poll source	Date(s) administered	Sample size	Margin of error	Tim Walz (DFL)	Generic Republican	Undecided
Change Research	August 28–31, 2021	1,945 (RV)	± 2.5%	46%	44%	10%

=== Results ===
2022 Minnesota gubernatorial election
Party	Candidate	Votes	%	±%
Democratic (DFL)	Tim Walz (incumbent); Peggy Flanagan (incumbent)	1,312,349	52.27%	−1.57%
Republican	Scott Jensen; Matt Birk	1,119,941	44.61%	+2.18%
Legal Marijuana Now	James McCaskel; David Sandbeck	29,346	1.17%	N/A
Grassroots—LC	Steve Patterson; Matt Huff	22,599	0.90%	−1.75%
Independence	Hugh McTavish; Mike Winter	18,156	0.72%	N/A
Socialist Workers	Gabrielle Prosser; Kevin Dwire	7,241	0.29%	N/A
Write-in		1,029	0.04%	±0.0%
Total votes		2,510,661	100.0%	
Turnout		2,525,873	61.01%	
Registered electors		4,140,218		
Democratic (DFL) hold				

==== By county ====
County	Tim Walz DFL		Scott Jensen GOP		James McCaskel LMN		Steve Patterson GLC		Hugh McTavish I-A		Gabrielle M. Prosser SWP		Write-in		Margin		Total votes
County	%	#	%	#	%	#	%	#	%	#	%	#	%	#	%	#	Total votes
Aitkin	35.93%	3,030	60.59%	5,110	1.42%	120	1.06%	89	0.78%	66	0.23%	19	0.00%	0	−24.66%	−2,080	8,434
Anoka	47.65%	74,515	48.97%	76,587	1.27%	1,985	1.02%'	1,600	0.76%	1,188	0.23%	361	0.05%	77	−1.33%	−2,072	156,390
Becker	32.12%	4,738	64.31%	9,486	1.48%	219	0.95%	140	0.95%	140	0.14%	21	0.02%	3	−32.20%	−4,748	14,750
Beltrami	44.90%	8,124	51.12%	9,248	1.66%	301	1.16%	209	0.76%	138	0.32%	58	0.04%	7	−6.22%	−1,124	18,092
Benton	31.99%	5,244	64.02%	10,495	1.49%	245	1.19%	195	0.94%	154	0.29%	48	0.04%	6	−32.04%	−5,251	16,393
Big Stone	35.40%	863	61.20%	1,492	1.56%	38	0.94%	23	0.70%	17	0.21%	5	0.00%	0	−25.80%	−629	2,438
Blue Earth	51.98%	13,783	44.89%	11,904	1.00%	265	0.85%	225	0.88%	234	0.34%	89	0.03%	9	7.09%	1,879	26,518
Brown	33.59%	3,915	63.83%	7,439	0.85%	99	0.75%	87	0.70%	82	0.16%	19	0.06%	7	−30.25%	−3,524	11,655
Carlton	49.74%	7,913	45.73%	7,274	1.82%	289	1.23%	196	1.09%	174	0.24%	38	0.08%	12	4.02%	639	15,908
Carver	45.89%	24,888	51.77%	28,078	0.72%	391	0.70%	381	0.70%	377	0.14%	74	0.05%	25	−5.88%	−3,190	54,239
Cass	33.32%	5,071	63.25%	9,626	1.45%	220	1.10%	168	0.71%	108	0.14%	22	0.01%	2	−29.93%	−4,555	15,219
Chippewa	33.98%	1,676	63.16%	3,115	0.81%	40	0.97%	48	0.85%	42	0.14%	7	0.04%	2	−29.19%	−1,439	4,932
Chisago	35.95%	9,321	60.35%	15,647	1.28%	332	1.43%	371	0.78%	202	0.19%	48	0.02%	4	−24.40%	−6,326	25,929
Clay	50.07%	11,139	45.84%	10,199	1.81%	402	0.99%	220	0.83%	185	0.40%	89	0.03%	7	4.23%	940	22,248
Clearwater	24.60%	879	71.37%	2,550	1.43%	51	1.34%	48	0.84%	30	0.20%	7	0.11%	4	−46.82%	−1,671	3,573
Cook	67.36%	2,171	29.72%	958	0.84%	27	0.87%	28	0.87%	28	0.22%	7	0.06%	2	37.66%	1,213	3,223
Cottonwood	29.51%	1,363	66.83%	3,087	1.34%	62	1.02%	47	1.06%	49	0.24%	11	0.00%	0	−37.32%	−1,724	4,619
Crow Wing	34.86%	11,388	61.80%	20,188	1.41%	459	0.99%	324	0.75%	246	0.13%	41	0.03%	10	−26.95%	−8,800	32,666
Dakota	55.81%	112,003	41.47%	83,220	1.03%	2,061	0.71%	1,431	0.68%	1,365	0.22%	451	0.04%	82	14.35%	28,783	200,695
Dodge	34.88%	3,287	62.14%	5,855	0.88%	83	0.99%	93	0.89%	84	0.18%	17	0.02%	2	−27.26%	−2,568	9,423
Douglas	32.25%	6,358	64.91%	12,797	1.02%	201	0.83%	164	0.82%	161	0.12%	23	0.03%	6	−32.67%	−6,439	19,716
Faribault	33.17%	2,000	63.78%	3,846	1.11%	67	0.86%	52	0.88%	53	0.13%	8	0.03%	2	−30.62%	−1,846	6,030
Fillmore	40.09%	3,809	57.17%	5,432	0.91%	86	0.94%	89	0.72%	68	0.17%	16	0.01%	1	−17.08%	−1,623	9,502
Freeborn	41.04%	5,350	55.71%	7,262	1.31%	171	1.05%	137	0.75%	98	0.12%	15	0.01%	1	−14.67%	−1,912	13,035
Goodhue	43.01%	9,940	53.69%	12,407	1.15%	266	1.03%	239	0.89%	205	0.18%	42	0.02%	5	−10.68%	−2,467	23,109
Grant	35.66%	1,054	59.91%	1,771	1.52%	45	1.29%	38	1.25%	37	0.17%	5	0.10%	3	−24.28%	−717	2,956
Hennepin	70.34%	405,013	26.81%	154,393	1.03%	5,939	0.72%	4,150	0.58%	3,326	0.42%	2,412	0.05%	296	43.55%	250,620	575,825
Houston	41.21%	3,604	55.73%	4,874	1.46%	128	0.79%	69	0.70%	61	0.10%	9	0.00%	0	−14.52%	−1,270	8,745
Hubbard	34.47%	3,672	61.87%	6,590	1.46%	155	1.05%	112	0.99%	105	0.11%	12	0.03%	3	−27.40%	−2,918	10,652
Isanti	30.63%	5,778	65.04%	12,271	1.70%	320	1.47%	277	0.93%	175	0.20%	37	0.02%	4	−34.42%	−6,493	18,866
Itasca	42.17%	9,017	53.73%	11,488	1.65%	352	1.24%	265	0.94%	200	0.20%	43	0.04%	8	−11.56%	−2,471	21,381
Jackson	29.59%	1,350	66.97%	3,055	1.12%	51	1.05%	48	0.99%	45	0.20%	9	0.04%	2	−37.39%	−1,705	4,562
Kanabec	31.80%	2,277	63.99%	4,582	1.68%	120	1.58%	113	0.81%	58	0.13%	9	0.01%	1	−32.19%	−2,305	7,161
Kandiyohi	35.20%	6,421	61.85%	11,281	1.12%	204	0.81%	148	0.77%	141	0.17%	31	0.04%	7	−26.65%	−4,860	18,240
Kittson	35.77%	689	60.23%	1,160	1.92%	37	1.30%	25	0.67%	13	0.10%	2	0.00%	0	−24.45%	−471	1,926
Koochiching	39.36%	2,058	56.47%	2,953	1.91%	100	1.07%	56	0.99%	52	0.11%	6	0.04%	2	−17.12%	−895	5,229
Lac qui Parle	34.98%	1,102	61.43%	1,935	0.83%	26	1.37%	43	1.21%	38	0.19%	6	0.00%	0	−26.44%	−833	3,150
Lake	52.46%	2,970	44.18%	2,501	1.27%	72	1.20%	68	0.62%	35	0.26%	15	0.00%	0	8.28%	469	5,661
Lake of the Woods	25.88%	473	70.95%	1,297	1.31%	24	0.77%	14	1.04%	19	0.05%	1	0.00%	0	−45.08%	−824	1,828
Le Sueur	34.72%	4,591	61.89%	8,184	1.28%	169	1.06%	140	0.81%	107	0.14%	19	0.05%	7	−27.18%	−3,593	13,224
Lincoln	29.09%	710	67.72%	1,653	1.31%	32	1.19%	29	0.49%	12	0.12%	3	0.04%	1	−38.65%	−943	2,441
Lyon	33.29%	3,264	63.91%	6,267	0.98%	96	0.67%	66	0.88%	86	0.15%	15	0.06%	6	−30.64%	−3,003	9,806
Mahnomen	39.48%	651	54.46%	898	2.18%	36	1.27%	21	2.06%	34	0.42%	7	0.06%	1	−14.99%	−247	1,649
Marshall	23.45%	954	73.01%	2,970	1.23%	50	1.01%	41	1.06%	43	0.20%	8	0.02%	1	−49.57%	−2,016	4,068
Martin	29.49%	2,471	67.37%	5,644	1.21%	101	0.97%	81	0.75%	63	0.12%	10	0.05%	4	−37.89%	−3,173	8,378
McLeod	31.42%	5,171	65.42%	10,768	1.15%	190	0.88%	145	0.87%	143	0.22%	37	0.02%	3	−34.01%	−5,597	16,460
Meeker	29.71%	3,214	67.01%	7,249	1.16%	125	1.00%	108	0.88%	95	0.18%	20	0.03%	3	−37.31%	−4,035	10,817
Mille Lacs	30.59%	3,390	65.05%	7,209	1.59%	176	1.45%	161	1.02%	113	0.23%	25	0.04%	4	−34.47%	−3,819	11,082
Morrison	22.32%	3,451	74.58%	11,529	1.18%	183	0.86%	133	0.85%	132	0.19%	29	0.01%	1	−52.26%	−8,078	15,459
Mower	46.58%	6,573	49.91%	7,043	1.36%	192	1.20%	170	0.67%	94	0.28%	40	0.00%	0	−3.33%	−470	14,112
Murray	26.83%	1,051	69.67%	2,729	1.23%	48	0.64%	25	1.25%	49	0.28%	11	0.05%	2	−42.86%	−1,678	3,917
Nicollet	51.78%	7,929	45.46%	6,962	1.01%	154	0.65%	99	0.80%	122	0.25%	38	0.03%	5	6.32%	967	15,314
Nobles	30.48%	1,854	65.97%	4,013	1.43%	87	0.72%	44	1.12%	68	0.25%	15	0.02%	1	−35.50%	−2,159	6,083
Norman	37.01%	929	57.69%	1,448	2.07%	52	1.31%	33	1.24%	31	0.20%	5	0.24%	6	−20.73%	−519	2,510
Olmsted	55.00%	37,471	42.66%	29,068	0.85%	576	0.65%	445	0.60%	412	0.20%	136	0.02%	13	12.34%	8,403	68,134
Otter Tail	31.37%	8,950	65.26%	18,618	1.25%	358	0.97%	278	0.89%	254	0.16%	47	0.05%	13	−33.90%	−9,668	28,531
Pennington	31.75%	1,734	63.42%	3,464	1.94%	106	1.08%	59	1.50%	82	0.27%	15	0.02%	1	−31.68%	−1,730	5,462
Pine	34.61%	4,290	61.32%	7,601	1.70%	211	1.44%	178	0.73%	90	0.16%	20	0.02%	3	−26.72%	−3,311	12,396
Pipestone	22.89%	872	74.01%	2,819	1.00%	38	0.97%	37	0.95%	36	0.18%	7	0.00%	0	−51.12%	−1,947	3,809
Polk	31.08%	3,400	65.64%	7,180	1.35%	148	0.90%	98	0.73%	80	0.21%	23	0.05%	5	−34.57%	−3,780	10,939
Pope	34.70%	1,970	62.50%	3,549	0.88%	50	0.76%	43	0.83%	47	0.16%	9	0.09%	5	−27.83%	−1,579	5,678
Ramsey	71.42%	155,850	25.10%	54,771	1.20%	2,626	1.03%	2,247	0.61%	1,338	0.51%	1,118	0.06%	127	46.35%	101,079	218,204
Red Lake	30.13%	483	65.32%	1,047	1.87%	30	0.87%	14	1.50%	24	0.19%	3	0.06%	1	−35.21%	−564	1,603
Redwood	26.37%	1,698	71.13%	4,581	1.10%	71	0.67%	43	0.54%	35	0.16%	10	0.02%	1	−44.77%	−2,883	6,440
Renville	29.89%	1,883	66.55%	4,192	1.43%	90	1.11%	70	0.81%	51	0.14%	9	0.03%	2	−36.67%	−2,309	6,299
Rice	50.21%	14,252	46.44%	13,182	1.24%	353	0.94%	267	0.69%	195	0.45%	127	0.01%	3	3.77%	1,070	28,382
Rock	27.51%	1,139	69.49%	2,877	0.99%	41	0.97%	40	0.82%	34	0.17%	7	0.02%	1	−41.99%	−1,738	4,140
Roseau	23.61%	1,535	73.57%	4,783	1.08%	70	0.78%	51	J0.82%	53	0.14%	9	0.00%	0	−49.96%	−3,248	6,501
Scott	45.40%	30,870	51.90%	35,289	1.05%	716	0.71%	484	0.66%	446	0.18%	124	0.05%	31	−6.50%	−4,419	67,991
Sherburne	32.90%	13,697	63.70%	26,517	1.29%	537	1.06%	443	0.83%	345	0.18%	74	0.02%	8	−30.80%	−12,820	41,629
Sibley	28.80%	1,907	68.24%	4,519	1.10%	73	0.82%	54	0.77%	51	0.21%	14	0.03%	2	−39.46%	−2,612	6,622
St. Louis	57.66%	53,551	38.08%	35,372	1.74%	1,616	1.25%	1,159	0.83%'	769	0.36%	334	0.04%	39	19.58%	18,179	92,879
Stearns	36.88%	24,162	59.79%	39,171	1.17%	767	1.02%	665	0.83%	542	0.23%	151	0.04%	27	−22.92%	−15,009	65,512
Steele	39.28%	6,498	57.33%	9,485	1.26%	208	1.06%	176	0.80%	133	0.21%'	34	0.03%	5	−18.06%	−2,987	16,544
Stevens	36.93%	1,490	60.40%	2,437	0.89%	36	0.69%	28	0.69%	28	0.30%	12	0.05%	2	−23.48%	−947	4,035
Swift	35.42%	1,389	61.42%	2,409	1.15%	45	0.84%	33	0.71%	28	0.20%	8	0.13%	5	−26.04%	−1,020	3,922
Todd	24.39%	2,649	71.63%	7,780	1.48%	161	1.10%	120	1.08%	117	0.28%	30	0.02%	2	−47.25%	−5,131	10,861
Traverse	33.51%	519	62.49%	968	1.55%	24	1.10%	17	1.10%	17	0.13%	2	0.06%	1	−29.01%	−449	1,549
Wabasha	37.46%	4,020	59.32%	6,366	1.11%	119	0.89%	96	0.96%	103	0.24%	26	0.01%	1	−21.86%	−2,346	10,732
Wadena	25.25%	1,511	71.20%	4,260	1.39%	83	1.12%	67	0.87%	52	0.17%	10	0.00%	0	−45.95%	−2,749	5,983
Waseca	33.91%	2,843	62.16%	5,212	1.41%	118	1.12%	94	1.11%	93	0.25%	21	0.02%	2	−28.26%	−2,369	8,385
Washington	54.15%	70,814	43.18%	56,472	0.93%	1,212	0.78%	1,019	0.68%	889	0.19%	254	0.04%	54	10.97%	14,342	130,768
Watonwan	37.35%	1,445	60.09%	2,325	1.06%	41	0.90%	35	0.44%	17	0.10%	4	0.03%	1	−22.75%	−880	3,869
Wilkin	27.13%	704	68.71%	1,783	1.58%	41	0.89%	23	1.08%	28	0.39%	10	0.12%	3	−41.63%	−1,079	2,595
Winona	48.35%	9,889	48.47%	9,913	1.22%	250	0.86%	176	0.78%	159	0.30%	62	0.00%	1	−0.12%	−24	20,451
Wright	34.90%	23,116	61.88%	40,993	1.10%	729	1.01%	671	0.87%	579	0.17%	114	0.03%	21	−27.00%	−17,877	66,244
Yellow Medicine	29.77%	1,299	66.90%	2,919	1.33%	58	0.99%	43	0.87%	38	0.05%	2	0.05%	2	−37.15%	−1,620	4,363
Totals	52.25%	1,312,349	44.59%	1,119,941	1.17%	29,346	0.90%	22,599	0.72%	18,156	0.29%	7,241	0.04%	1,029	7.66%	192,408	2,511,690

Counties that flipped from Democratic to Republican

- Anoka (largest city: Blaine)
- Beltrami (largest city: Bemidji)
- Freeborn (largest city: Albert Lea)
- Houston (largest city: La Crescent)
- Koochiching (largest city: International Falls)
- Mahnomen (largest city: Mahnomen)
- Mower (largest city: Austin)
- Norman (largest city: Ada) (tied in 2018)

==== By congressional district ====
Walz and Jensen each won four of eight congressional districts, all of which voted for the same party in the simultaneous house elections.

District	Walz	Jensen	Representative
1st	45%	52%	Brad Finstad
2nd	53%	45%	Angie Craig
3rd	59%	38%	Dean Phillips
4th	68%	29%	Betty McCollum
5th	81%	16%	Ilhan Omar
6th	40%	57%	Tom Emmer
7th	31%	65%	Michelle Fischbach
8th	44%	52%	Pete Stauber

== See also ==
- 2022 United States gubernatorial elections
- 2022 Minnesota elections
- 2022 Minnesota Senate election
- 2022 Minnesota House of Representatives election
- Litter boxes in schools hoax

== Notes ==
Partisan clients
