= Chanhassen, Minnesota =

City in Minnesota, United States

- City
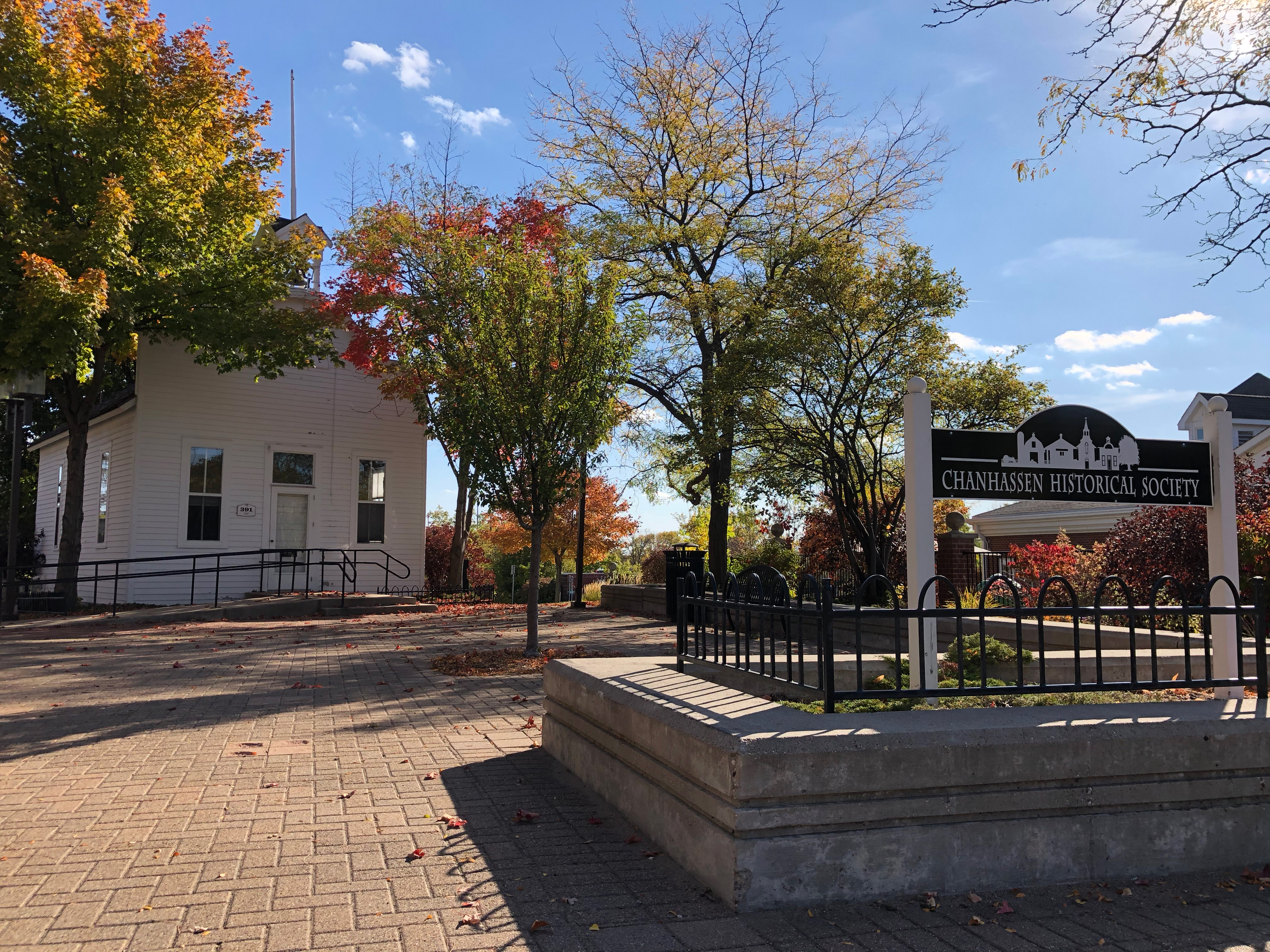
- Historic Village Hall

- Flag Seal

- Location of Chanhassen in Carver County, Minnesota

- Location in the United States Chanhassen (the United States)
- Coordinates: 44°51′43″N 93°31′57″W
- Country: United States
- State: Minnesota
- County: Carver, Hennepin
- Settled: June 1852
- Organized: May 11, 1858
- Incorporated as a village: April 25, 1896
- Incorporated as a city: May 8, 1967

Government
  - Mayor: Elise Ryan

Area
  - Total: 22.80 sq mi (59.06 km^{2})
  - Land: 20.36 sq mi (52.73 km^{2})
  - Water: 2.44 sq mi (6.33 km^{2})
- Elevation: 968 ft (295 m)

Population (2020)
  - Total: 25,947
  - Estimate (2022): 26,224
  - Density: 1,274.4/sq mi (492.04/km^{2})
- Time zone: UTC-6 (Central (CST))
  - Summer (DST): UTC-5 (CDT)
- ZIP code: 55317
- Area code: 952
- FIPS code: 27-10918
- Website: chanhassenmn.gov

Chanhassen (/tʃænˈhæsən/ chan-HASS-ən) is a city in Carver County, Minnesota, United States, about 15 miles (24 km) southwest of Minneapolis. The population was 25,947 at the 2020 census, with a 2024 estimate of 26,469. A small part of the city extends eastward into Hennepin County.

A southwestern suburb of Minneapolis–Saint Paul, Chanhassen is one of the more recently developed cities in the region. Its population has grown by 123.5% since 1990. The city is home to the headquarters of Life Time Fitness and Prince's former estate, Paisley Park, which is now a museum.

== History ==
=== Early settlement ===
The area of the modern-day city of Chanhassen was first established in June 1852. The first recorded settler of Chanhassen was Joseph Vogel, along with his brothers Frank Vogel and August Vogel, who settled on Rice Marsh Lake in Chanhassen near the border of Shakopee and Eden Prairie. The second major settler of Chanhassen was Joseph Kessler, who settled just north of Vogel's land claim. In August 1852, Vogel married Kessler's daughter, Veronica Kessler, the first recorded marriage in Chanhassen. The first recorded death in Chanhassen was Cornelius Kirscher in 1853. Other regionally famous early settlers of Chanhassen include George Mayo Powers, Susan Hazeltine, Henry Martyn Lyman, Charles Galpin, and Arba Cleaveland. Chanhassen was settled primarily by German American immigrants who settled on farmsteads and often traded with the nearby settlements of Smithtown on Lake Minnetonka (now Minnetonka, Minnesota) to the north, and the city of Chaska, Minnesota to the south. The first school in Chanhassen and Carver County opened in 1855 at the residence of Susan Hazeltine near Hazeltine Lake and the Hazeltine National Golf Club.

=== Namesake ===
According to the Carver County Historical Society, the first recorded use of the name Chanhassen was in 1853. According to the article "The Northampton Colony and Chanhassen" by Charles W. Nicholas, it was not until May 11, 1858, that "Chanhassan" was chosen as the village's official name. "Chanhassen" comes from the Dakota word chanhasen, meaning "sugar-maple tree" (chan, tree; haza, a tree with sap). The name choice of Chanhassen is commonly attributed to Clarissa Cleaveland, Arba Cleaveland's wife. Similarly, the northern metro area Hassan Township carried the latter morpheme of the word before it merged with Rogers to avoid confusion.

=== Later history ===
For much of its recorded history Chanhassen has been a small agricultural and rural township. Since the first settlement, the area of Chanhassen was divided into two major areas, the village of Chanhassen, and the township of Chanhassen. The village of Chanhassen consisted of roughly 200-250 people, primarily Catholic German Americans, who lived near the Church of St. Hubertus. Meanwhile, the township of Chanhassen encompassed the broader community of roughly 4,000 people. By the 1940's Chanhassen consisted of two general stores, two bars, the Schutrop’s feed mill, a lumber yard, and the State Bank of Chanhassen. According to the Carver County Historical Society, well into the 1950's Chanhassen still had a population of roughly 200 people. Chanhassen did not officially become a city until May 8, 1967, when it was merged with Chanhassen Township, bringing the population to 4,200.

== Geography ==
According to the United States Census Bureau, the city has an area of 22.88 square miles (59.26 km^{2}), of which 20.44 square miles (52.94 km^{2}) is land and 2.44 square miles (6.32 km^{2}) is water. Most of Chanhassen is in Carver County. A small portion extends into Hennepin County.

U.S. Highway 212 and Minnesota State Highways 5 and 41 are three of the main routes in Chanhassen.

Township 116 North, Range 23 West, Fifth Principal Meridian of the Public Land Survey System.

=== Climate ===
Climate data for Chanhassen, Minnesota, 1991–2020 normals, extremes 1996–present
| Month | Jan | Feb | Mar | Apr | May | Jun | Jul | Aug | Sep | Oct | Nov | Dec | Year |
|---|---|---|---|---|---|---|---|---|---|---|---|---|---|
| Record high °F (°C) | 55 (13) | 62 (17) | 79 (26) | 90 (32) | 99 (37) | 100 (38) | 99 (37) | 96 (36) | 95 (35) | 90 (32) | 77 (25) | 67 (19) | 100 (38) |
| Mean maximum °F (°C) | 41.5 (5.3) | 44.5 (6.9) | 62.5 (16.9) | 77.9 (25.5) | 89.6 (32.0) | 91.1 (32.8) | 92.3 (33.5) | 88.3 (31.3) | 86.7 (30.4) | 78.1 (25.6) | 64.1 (17.8) | 45.7 (7.6) | 94.5 (34.7) |
| Mean daily maximum °F (°C) | 22.4 (−5.3) | 27.0 (−2.8) | 40.2 (4.6) | 55.2 (12.9) | 67.8 (19.9) | 77.4 (25.2) | 81.4 (27.4) | 79.1 (26.2) | 71.4 (21.9) | 57.1 (13.9) | 40.6 (4.8) | 27.2 (−2.7) | 53.9 (12.2) |
| Daily mean °F (°C) | 14.0 (−10.0) | 18.0 (−7.8) | 31.0 (−0.6) | 45.0 (7.2) | 57.3 (14.1) | 67.5 (19.7) | 71.7 (22.1) | 69.4 (20.8) | 61.3 (16.3) | 47.4 (8.6) | 32.7 (0.4) | 19.8 (−6.8) | 44.6 (7.0) |
| Mean daily minimum °F (°C) | 5.6 (−14.7) | 9.0 (−12.8) | 21.7 (−5.7) | 34.8 (1.6) | 46.8 (8.2) | 57.6 (14.2) | 62.1 (16.7) | 59.7 (15.4) | 51.1 (10.6) | 37.8 (3.2) | 24.9 (−3.9) | 12.3 (−10.9) | 35.3 (1.8) |
| Mean minimum °F (°C) | −16.7 (−27.1) | −13.2 (−25.1) | −1.0 (−18.3) | 20.6 (−6.3) | 33.5 (0.8) | 45.9 (7.7) | 53.7 (12.1) | 50.3 (10.2) | 37.2 (2.9) | 23.5 (−4.7) | 7.5 (−13.6) | −8.7 (−22.6) | −20.2 (−29.0) |
| Record low °F (°C) | −31 (−35) | −35 (−37) | −19 (−28) | 6 (−14) | 28 (−2) | 41 (5) | 48 (9) | 38 (3) | 30 (−1) | 13 (−11) | −10 (−23) | −26 (−32) | −35 (−37) |
| Average precipitation inches (mm) | 0.87 (22) | 0.94 (24) | 1.56 (40) | 3.16 (80) | 4.36 (111) | 4.40 (112) | 3.87 (98) | 4.76 (121) | 3.29 (84) | 2.66 (68) | 1.73 (44) | 1.21 (31) | 32.81 (835) |
| Average snowfall inches (cm) | 10.0 (25) | 11.2 (28) | 9.1 (23) | 5.4 (14) | 0.0 (0.0) | 0.0 (0.0) | 0.0 (0.0) | 0.0 (0.0) | 0.0 (0.0) | 0.6 (1.5) | 5.1 (13) | 13.3 (34) | 54.7 (138.5) |
| Average extreme snow depth inches (cm) | 7.1 (18) | 9.5 (24) | 9.1 (23) | 3.3 (8.4) | 0.0 (0.0) | 0.0 (0.0) | 0.0 (0.0) | 0.0 (0.0) | 0.0 (0.0) | 0.1 (0.25) | 2.2 (5.6) | 7.3 (19) | 11.9 (30) |
| Average precipitation days (≥ 0.01 in) | 8.9 | 7.5 | 8.9 | 10.9 | 12.7 | 12.2 | 10.1 | 10.0 | 9.4 | 10.0 | 7.6 | 9.3 | 117.5 |
| Average snowy days (≥ 0.1 in) | 9.4 | 7.1 | 5.5 | 2.5 | 0.1 | 0.0 | 0.0 | 0.0 | 0.0 | 0.8 | 4.2 | 8.9 | 38.5 |
Source 1: NOAA
Source 2: National Weather Service (mean maxima/minima, snow depth 2006–2020)

== Demographics ==
Historical population
| Census | Pop. | Note | %± |
|---|---|---|---|
| 1900 | 175 | | — |
| 1910 | 164 | | −6.3% |
| 1920 | 129 | | −21.3% |
| 1930 | 128 | | −0.8% |
| 1940 | 132 | | 3.1% |
| 1950 | 182 | | 37.9% |
| 1960 | 244 | | 34.1% |
| 1970 | 4,879 | | 1,899.6% |
| 1980 | 6,359 | | 30.3% |
| 1990 | 11,732 | | 84.5% |
| 2000 | 20,321 | | 73.2% |
| 2010 | 22,952 | | 12.9% |
| 2020 | 25,947 | | 13.0% |
| 2022 (est.) | 26,224 | | 1.1% |
U.S. Decennial Census; 2020 Census

=== Income ===
According to data from the U.S. Census Bureau, the median household income (using data from 2008 to 2012) in Chanhassen was $103,462. For the same period the per capita income was $46,305. Three percent of the population was living below the poverty line.

=== 2020 census ===
As of the 2020 census, Chanhassen had a population of 25,947. The median age was 40.9 years. 25.7% of residents were under the age of 18 and 13.3% of residents were 65 years of age or older. For every 100 females there were 95.5 males, and for every 100 females age 18 and over there were 93.1 males age 18 and over.

96.1% of residents lived in urban areas, while 3.9% lived in rural areas.

There were 9,644 households in Chanhassen, of which 36.8% had children under the age of 18 living in them. Of all households, 64.9% were married-couple households, 11.2% were households with a male householder and no spouse or partner present, and 19.8% were households with a female householder and no spouse or partner present. About 20.7% of all households were made up of individuals and 8.6% had someone living alone who was 65 years of age or older.

There were 10,020 housing units, of which 3.8% were vacant. The homeowner vacancy rate was 0.6% and the rental vacancy rate was 8.5%.

Racial composition as of the 2020 census
| Race | Number | Percent |
|---|---|---|
| White | 22,095 | 85.2% |
| Black or African American | 360 | 1.4% |
| American Indian and Alaska Native | 46 | 0.2% |
| Asian | 1,608 | 6.2% |
| Native Hawaiian and Other Pacific Islander | 5 | 0.0% |
| Some other race | 354 | 1.4% |
| Two or more races | 1,479 | 5.7% |
| Hispanic or Latino (of any race) | 956 | 3.7% |

=== 2010 census ===
As of the census of 2010, there were 22,952 people, 8,352 households, and 6,257 families living in the city. The population density was 1,122.9 inhabitants per square mile (433.6/km^{2}). There were 8,679 housing units at an average density of 424.6 per square mile (163.9/km^{2}). The racial makeup of the city was 92.5% White, 1.1% African American, 0.1% Native American, 3.9% Asian, 0.9% from other races, and 1.5% from two or more races. Hispanic or Latino of any race were 2.3% of the population.

There were 8,352 households, of which 42.5% had children under the age of 18 living with them, 65.9% were married couples living together, 6.4% had a female householder with no husband present, 2.6% had a male householder with no wife present, and 25.1% were non-families. 20.6% of all households were made up of individuals, and 6.3% had someone living alone who was 65 years of age or older. The average household size was 2.75 and the average family size was 3.23.

The median age in the city was 39.3 years. 30.2% of residents were under the age of 18; 5.5% were between the ages of 18 and 24; 24.3% were from 25 to 44; 32.3% were from 45 to 64; and 7.7% were 65 years of age or older. The gender makeup of the city was 49.1% male and 50.9% female.

=== 2000 census ===
As of the census of 2000, there were 20,321 people, 6,914 households, and 5,524 families living in the city. The population density was 978.1 inhabitants per square mile (377.6/km^{2}). There were 7,013 housing units at an average density of 337.6 per square mile (130.3/km^{2}). The racial makeup of the city was 94.90% White, 0.75% African American, 0.15% Native American, 2.83% Asian, 0.41% from other races, and 0.95% from two or more races. Hispanic or Latino of any race were 1.98% of the population.

There were 6,914 households, out of which 51.1% had children under the age of 18 living with them, 71.2% were married couples living together, 6.2% had a female householder with no husband present, and 20.1% were non-families. 15.7% of all households were made up of individuals, and 3.0% had someone living alone who was 65 years of age or older. The average household size was 2.94 and the average family size was 3.33.

In the city, the population was spread out, with 34.6% under the age of 18, 4.4% from 18 to 24, 37.0% from 25 to 44, 19.5% from 45 to 64, and 4.5% who were 65 years of age or older. The median age was 34 years. For every 100 females, there were 100.5 males. For every 100 females age 18 and over, there were 97.3 males.

== Economy ==
Companies with headquarters in Chanhassen include:

- AmericInn
- Bongards Creameries
- Life Time Fitness
- Snap Fitness
- Supervalu has its western satellite of the corporate headquarters in Chanhassen.

=== Top employers ===
According to the city's 2022 Comprehensive Annual Financial Report (CAFR), the top employers in the city are:

| # | Employer | # of Employees |
|---|---|---|
| 1 | Life Time Fitness | 1,171 |
| 2 | Instant Web Companies | 718 |
| 3 | The Bernard Group | 686 |
| 4 | Rosemount Inc. | 550 |
| 5 | Eastern Carver County Schools | 464 |
| 6 | Chanhassen Dinner Theatres | 350 |
| 7 | General Mills | 344 |
| 8 | RR Donnelley | 275 |
| 9 | Target | 225 |
| 10 | Minnesota Landscape Arboretum | 192 |

== Arts and culture ==
=== Points of interest ===
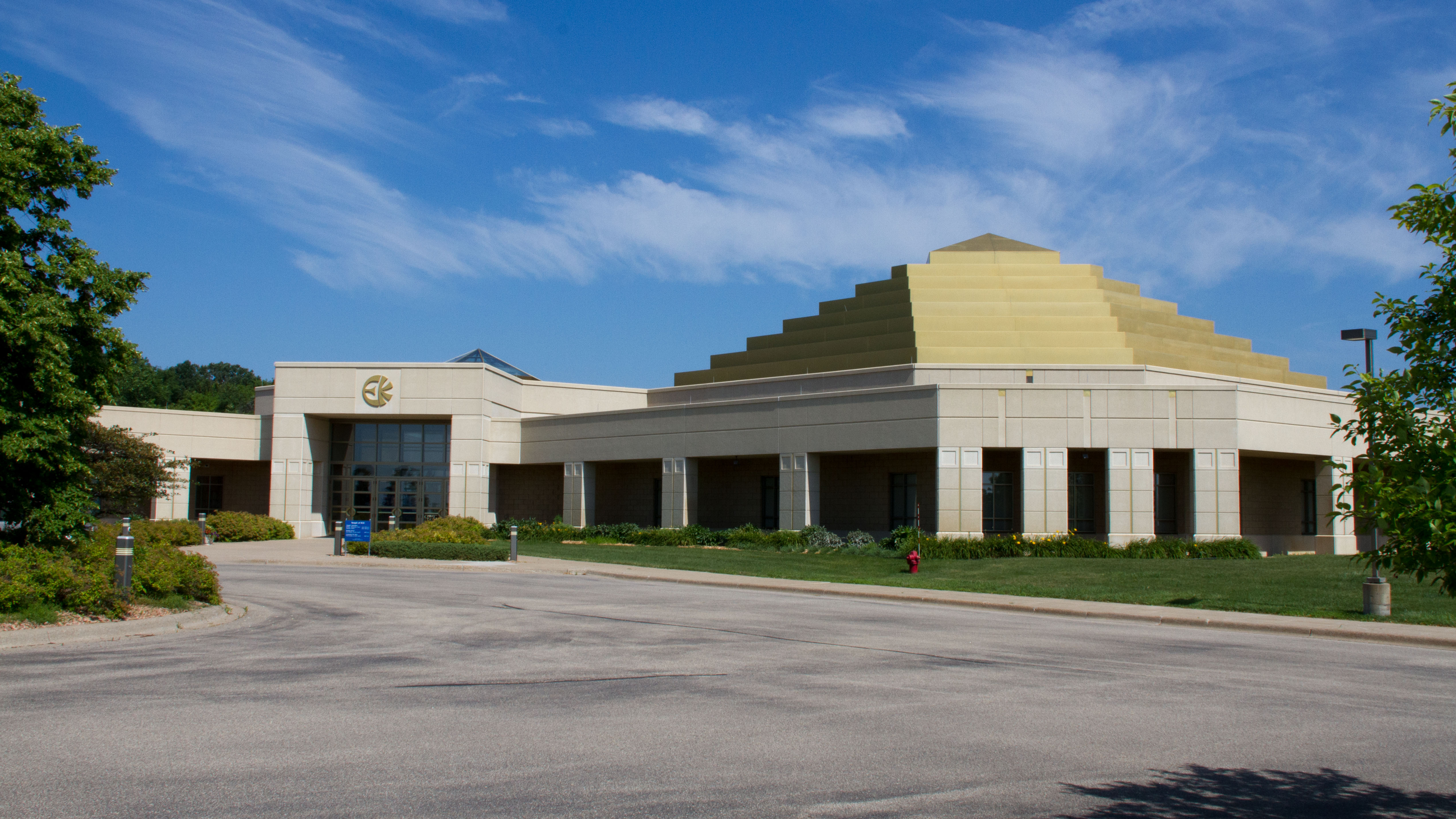
The Temple of Eck on the Eckankar Spiritual Campus

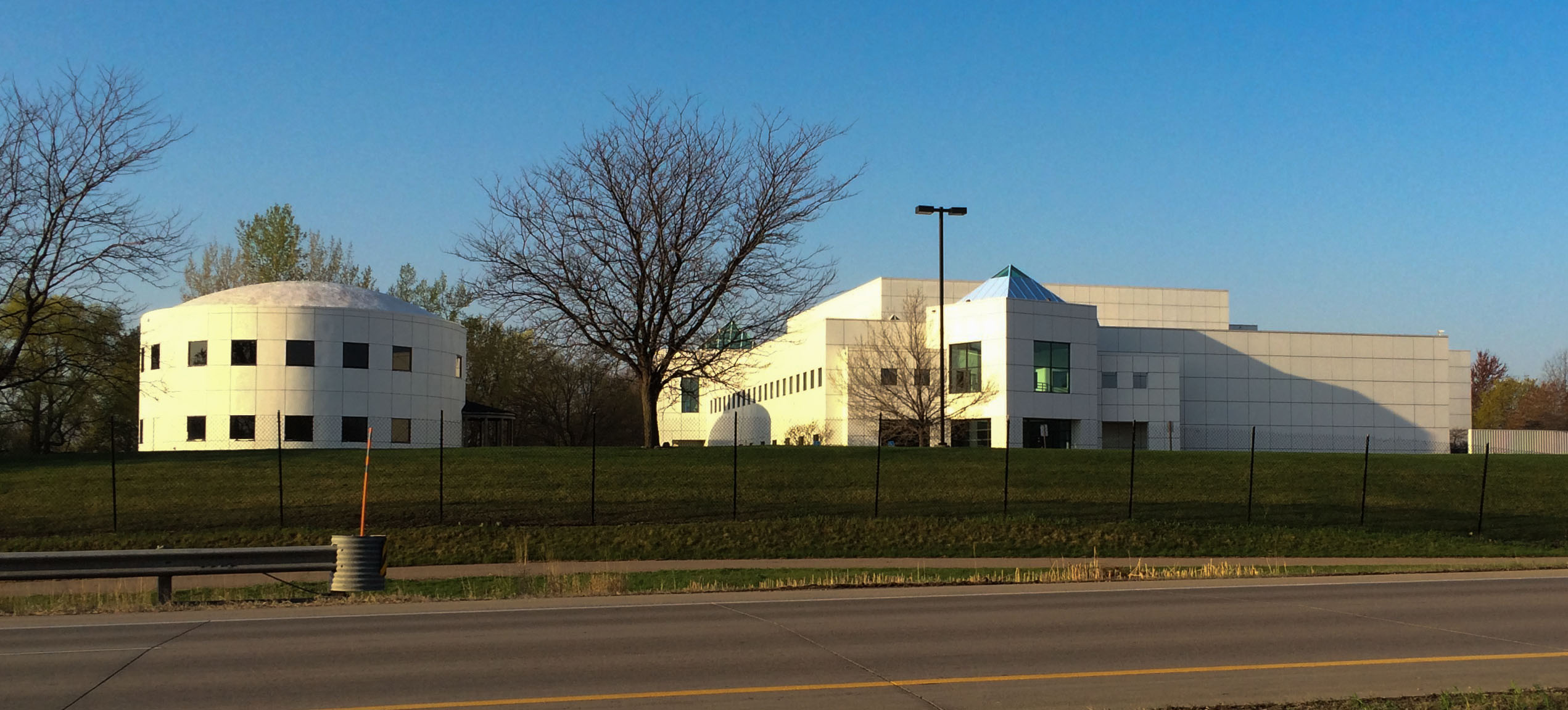
Prince's Paisley Park studios complex

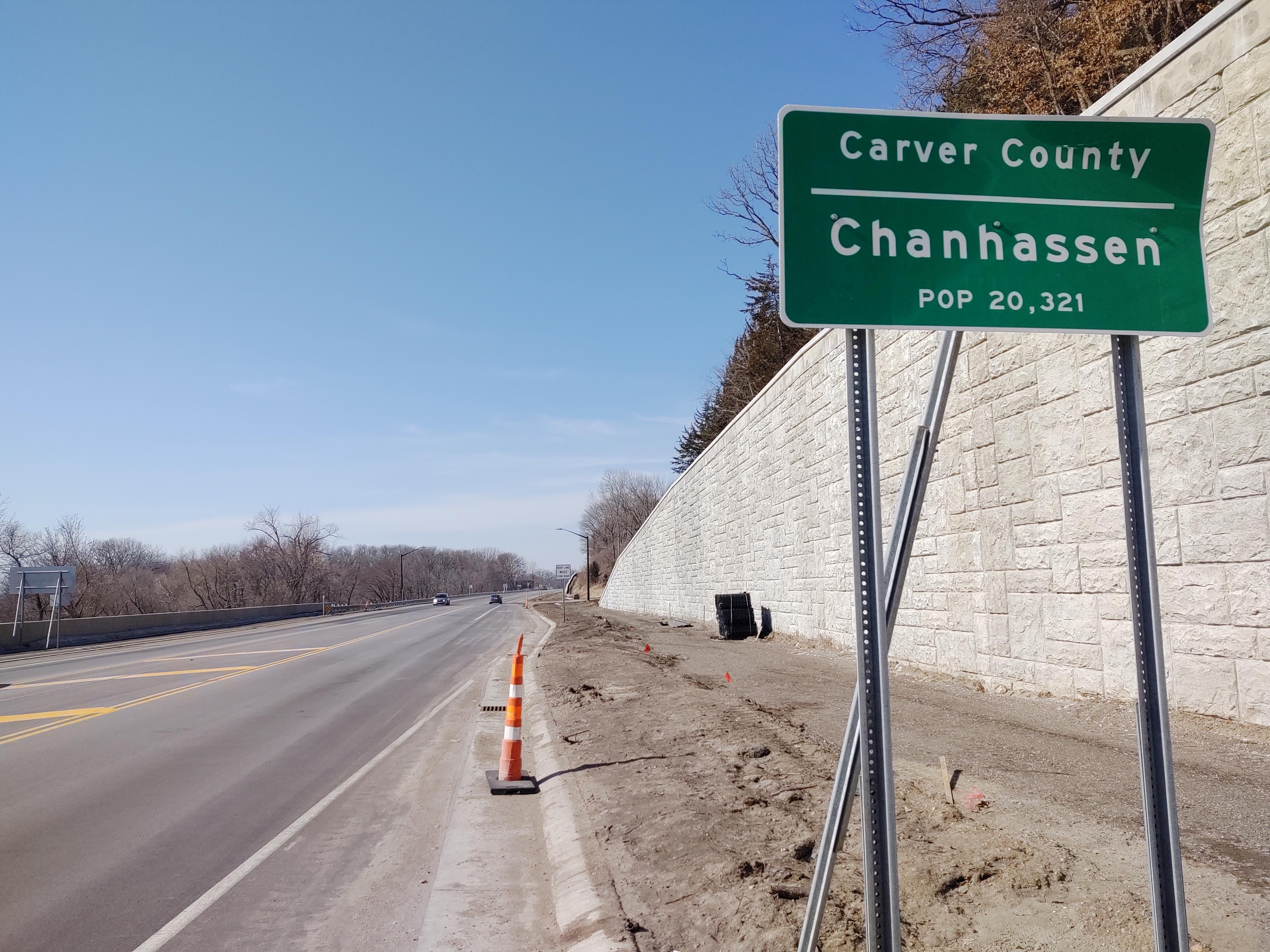
Looking west on CSAH 61

Chanhassen is home to several attractions that are well-recognized throughout the state and even nationally.

- Minnesota Landscape Arboretum
- Paisley Park
- Chanhassen Dinner Theatres
- Eckankar Spiritual Campus and the Temple of Eck
- US National Oceanic and Atmospheric Administration's Twin Cities National Weather Service Forecast Office - MPX

=== Chanhassen Dinner Theatres ===
Chanhassen Dinner Theatres is the nation's largest professional dinner theatre and Minnesota's largest privately owned restaurant. Since 1968, more than 200 plays have been produced and played to more than ten million guests.

== Sports ==
Many youth sports programs are offered through the Chanhassen Athletic Association, including baseball, softball, basketball, and soccer.

Chanhassen is also home to the Chanhassen Red Birds amateur baseball team (2018 Class B State Champions).

== Parks and recreation ==
Chanhassen strongly emphasizes parks, open space, trails, and recreation.

=== Beaches ===
Chanhassen has five public beaches.

- Lake Ann Beach (Lake Ann)
- Greenwood Shores Beach (Lake Ann)
- Minnewashta Regional Park (Lake Minnewashta)
- Roundhouse Park Beach (Lake Minnewashta)
- Carver Beach (Lotus Lake)

=== Trails ===
Chanhassen prides itself on providing a comprehensive, multipurpose trail system. It has built and maintains 70 miles of trails. Many of the trails are in natural resource corridors.

=== Skate Park ===
The Chanhassen Skate Park was installed in 1999. It is between City Hall and the downtown fire station. It features a wedge, quarter pipe, half pipe, hotbox, doobie roller, spine, and grind rails.

=== Fishing ===
Several well-producing lakes in Chanhassen keep anglers busy year-round. Both Lake Minnewashta and Lake Ann contain large aggressive northern pike.

== Government ==
Chanhassen is in Minnesota's 6th congressional district, represented by Republican Tom Emmer. President George W. Bush was the first sitting U.S. president to visit Chanhassen, holding a rally on October 9, 2004, at Chanhassen's City Center Park.

The National Weather Service's forecast office for west-central, south-central, north-central and the Twin Cities areas of Minnesota and western Wisconsin is in Chanhassen.

== Education ==
Chanhassen is split between two school districts. Most of the city is in District 112 (Eastern Carver County School District), with most Chanhassen students attending Chanhassen High School, Pioneer Ridge Middle School, Chanhassen Elementary, and Bluff Creek Elementary.

Northern sections of Chanhassen are part of District 276 (Minnetonka School District), with most students attending Minnetonka High School, Minnetonka Middle School West, Clear Springs Elementary, and Excelsior Elementary. Some students attend public schools in other school districts chosen by their families under Minnesota's open enrollment statute. Chapel Hill Academy and St. Hubert Catholic School are private primary education institutions in downtown Chanhassen.

== Media ==
The Chanhassen Villager was the city's weekly newspaper. In April 2024, Southwest News Media announced it would stop publishing the Villager and its other metro newspapers by the end of the month. The final edition was published on April 25, 2024.

== Notable people ==
- Jared Allen, former Minnesota Vikings defensive end, resided in Chanhassen during the season
- Stu Bickel, NHL defenseman for the New York Rangers
- Julia Coleman, politician and member of the Minnesota Senate
- Gary Curtis, racing driver
- Tony Denman, actor, grew up in Chanhassen
- James Denton, actor
- Verne Gagne, professional wrestler and promoter of the American Wrestling Association
- Rory Guilday, professional ice hockey defender for the Ottawa Charge
- Dave Huffman, former NFL player for the Minnesota Vikings lived in Chanhassen
- Kris Humphries, NBA player for the Atlanta Hawks
- Jim Lord, Minnesota State Treasurer
- Miles Lord, attorney and United States District Court judge
- Tim Mattran, NFL player for the Oakland Raiders, grew up in Chanhassen
- John L. Nelson, jazz musician and father of rock musician Prince
- Erik Paulsen, former representative Minnesota's 3rd congressional district in the United States House of Representatives
- Prince, singer and musician, owned Paisley Park
- Frank Ragnow, professional football player with the Detroit Lions, played high school football in Chanhassen
- Lucy Rehm, politician and member of the Minnesota House of Representatives
- Debbie Turner, actress
