= 2012 United States House of Representatives elections in Minnesota =

- November 6, 2012

All 8 Minnesota seats to the United States House of Representatives
	Majority party	Minority party
Party	Democratic (DFL)	Republican
Last election	4	4
Seats won	5	3
Seat change	▲1	▼1
Popular vote	1,560,984	1,210,409
Percentage	55.48%	43.02%
Swing	▲7.55%	▼3.41%

Democratic hold Democratic gain
Republican hold
Democratic
40–50%
50–60%
60–70%
70–80%
Republican
50–60%
60–70%

The 2012 United States House of Representatives elections in Minnesota were held on Tuesday, November 6, 2012, to elect the eight U.S. representatives from the state of Minnesota. The elections coincided with the elections of other federal and state offices, including a quadrennial presidential election and an election to the U.S. Senate. Primary elections were held on August 14, 2012.

== Overview ==
=== Statewide ===
The table below shows the total number and percentage of votes, as well as the number of seats gained and lost by each political party in the election for the United States House of Representatives in Minnesota.

Party	Candidates	Votes		Seats		
Party	Candidates	No.	%	No.	+/–	%
Democratic-Farmer-Labor	8	1,560,984	55.48	5	▲1	62.50
Republican	8	1,210,409	43.02	3	▼1	37.50
Independence	2	36,433	1.29	0	Steady	0.0
Write-in	8	5,557	0.20	0	Steady	0.0
Total	26	2,813,383	100.0	8	Steady	100.0

Popular vote
Democratic	55.48%
Republican	43.02%
Independence	1.29%
Other	0.20%

House seats
Democratic	62.50%
Republican	37.50%

=== By district ===
Results of the 2012 United States House of Representatives elections in Minnesota by district:

District	Democratic		Republican		Others		Total		Result
District	Votes	%	Votes	%	Votes	%	Votes	%	Result
District 1	193,211	57.52%	142,164	42.33%	505	0.15%	335,880	100.0%	Democratic hold
District 2	164,338	45.85%	193,587	54.01%	521	0.15%	358,446	100.0%	Republican hold
District 3	159,937	41.79%	222,335	58.10%	433	0.11%	382,705	100.0%	Republican hold
District 4	216,685	62.27%	109,659	31.51%	21,647	6.22%	347,991	100.0%	Democratic hold
District 5	262,102	74.47%	88,753	25.22%	1,114	0.32%	351,969	100.0%	Democratic hold
District 6	174,944	49.26%	179,240	50.47%	969	0.27%	355,153	100.0%	Republican hold
District 7	197,791	60.38%	114,151	34.85%	15,634	4.77%	327,576	100.0%	Democratic hold
District 8	191,976	54.28%	160,520	45.39%	1,167	0.33%	353,663	100.0%	Democratic gain
Total	1,560,984	55.48%	1,210,409	43.02%	41,990	1.49%	2,813,383	100.0%	

== Redistricting ==
A redistricting plan was proposed by Republicans in the Minnesota Legislature on May 9, 2011. The plan was passed by the Minnesota House of Representatives on May 13 and the Minnesota Senate on May 18, but was vetoed by Democratic Governor Mark Dayton on May 19.

In February 2012, a state court panel redrew Minnesota's congressional boundaries with the effect of enacting a "least-change" map.

== District 1 ==
2012 Minnesota's 1st congressional district election
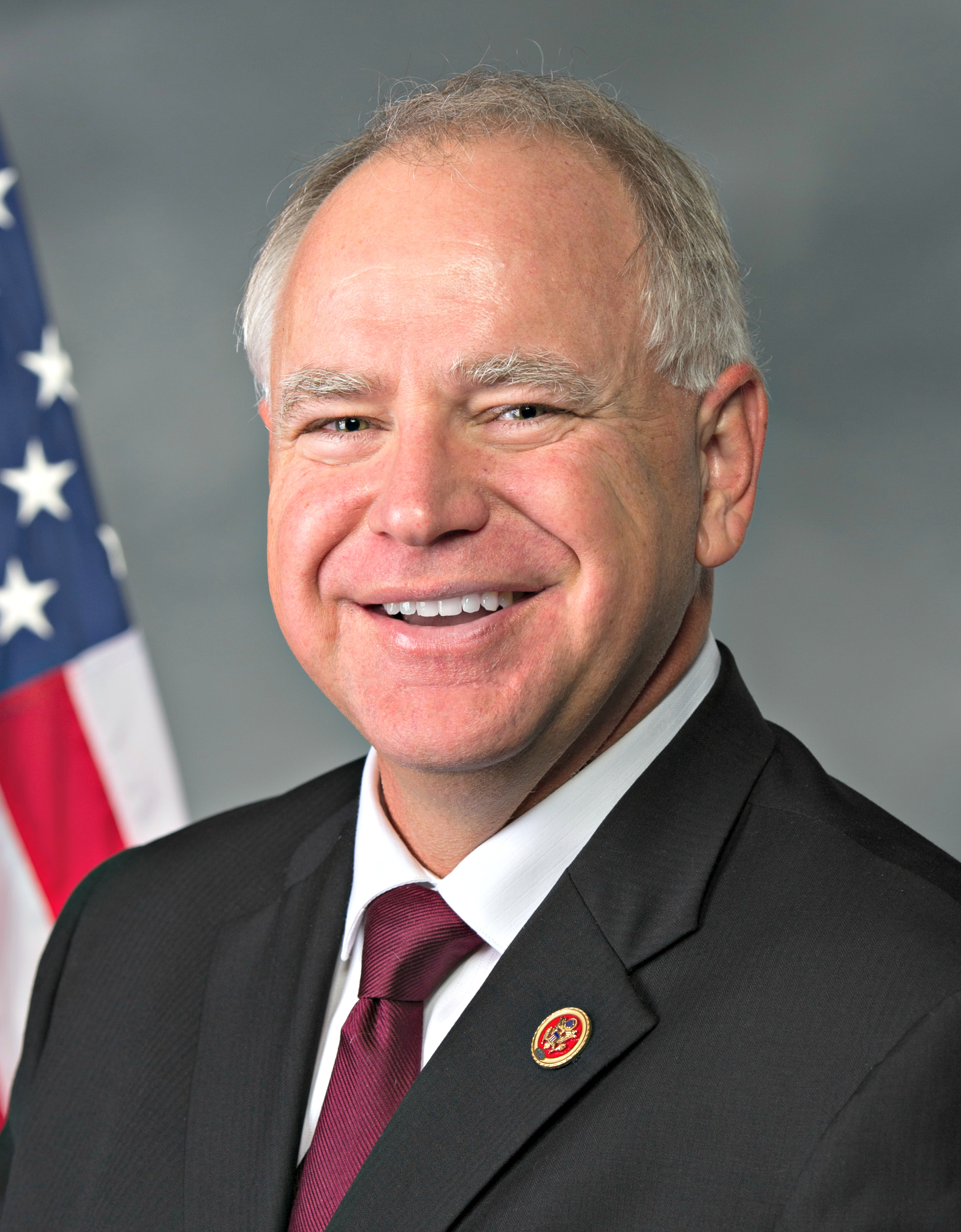

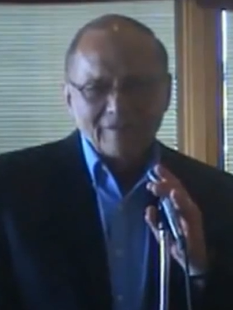
Nominee	Tim Walz	Allen Quist
Party	Democratic (DFL)	Republican
Popular vote	193,211	142,164
Percentage	57.5%	42.3%
- Walz: 40–50% 50–60% 60–70% 70–80% 80–90% >90% Quist: 50–60% 60–70% 70–80% 80–90% Tie: 40–50% 50% No votes
U.S. Representative before election
Tim Walz
Democratic (DFL)
Elected U.S. Representative
Tim Walz
Democratic (DFL)

Democrat Tim Walz, who had represented Minnesota's 1st congressional district since 2007, sought re-election. In redistricting, Murray County, Pipestone County and half of Cottonwood County were moved from the 1st district to the 7th, and Wabasha County was moved from the 1st district to the 2nd, while Le Sueur County and most of Rice County were moved from the 2nd district to the 1st. The 1st district was expected to continue to slightly favor Republicans.

=== Democratic primary ===
==== Candidates ====
===== Nominee =====
- Tim Walz, incumbent U.S. representative

==== Results ====
Democratic primary results
Party	Candidate	Votes	%
Democratic (DFL)	Tim Walz (incumbent)	15,697	100.0
Total votes		15,697	100.0

=== Republican primary ===
==== Candidates ====
===== Nominee =====
- Allen Quist, former state representative from legislative district 23B (1983–1989), candidate for governor in 1994 & 1998 and for this seat in 2010

===== Eliminated in primary =====
- Mike Parry, state senator from senate district 26 since 2010

===== Declined =====
- Randy Demmer, former state representative nominee for this seat in 2010
- Steve Drazkowski, state representative
- Julie Rosen, state senator

==== Results ====
Republican primary results
Party	Candidate	Votes	%
Republican	Allen Quist	12,540	54.1
Republican	Mike Parry	10,622	45.9
Total votes		23,162	100.0

=== General election ===
==== Endorsements ====
Tim Walz (DFL)

Labor unions

- AFL-CIO
- American Federation of State, County and Municipal Employees
- Education Minnesota
- National Association of Letter Carriers
- National Education Association
- Service Employees International Union
- United Steelworkers

Organizations

- Clean Water Action
- Feminist Majority
- NARAL Pro-Choice America
- NRA Political Victory Fund
- Planned Parenthood Action Fund
- Sierra Club
- Stonewall Democrats
- Veterans' Alliance for Security and Democracy
- VoteVets
Allen Quist (R)

Organizations

- Campaign for Working Families
- Eagle Forum
- National Right to Life Committee

==== Predictions ====
Source	Ranking	As of
The Cook Political Report	Safe D	November 5, 2012
Rothenberg	Safe D	November 2, 2012
Roll Call	Safe D	November 4, 2012
Sabato's Crystal Ball	Safe D	November 5, 2012
NY Times	Safe D	November 4, 2012
RCP	Safe D	November 4, 2012
The Hill	Safe D	November 4, 2012

==== Results ====
Walz handily dispatched Quist in the election, garnering 58% of the vote.

Minnesota's 1st congressional district, 2012
Party	Candidate	Votes	%
Democratic (DFL)	Tim Walz (incumbent)	193,211	57.5
Republican	Allen Quist	142,164	42.3
Write-in		505	0.2
Total votes		335,880	100.00
Democratic (DFL) hold			

==== Finances ====
===== Campaigns =====
Candidate (party)	Raised	Spent	Cash on hand
Tim Walz (DFL)	$1,975,606	$1,930,831	$63,237
Allen Quist (R)	$595,215	$595,312	$0

===== Outside Spending =====
Candidate (party)	Supported	Opposed
Tim Walz (DFL)	$26,390	$0
Allen Quist (R)	$276	$0

== District 2 ==
2012 Minnesota's 2nd congressional district election
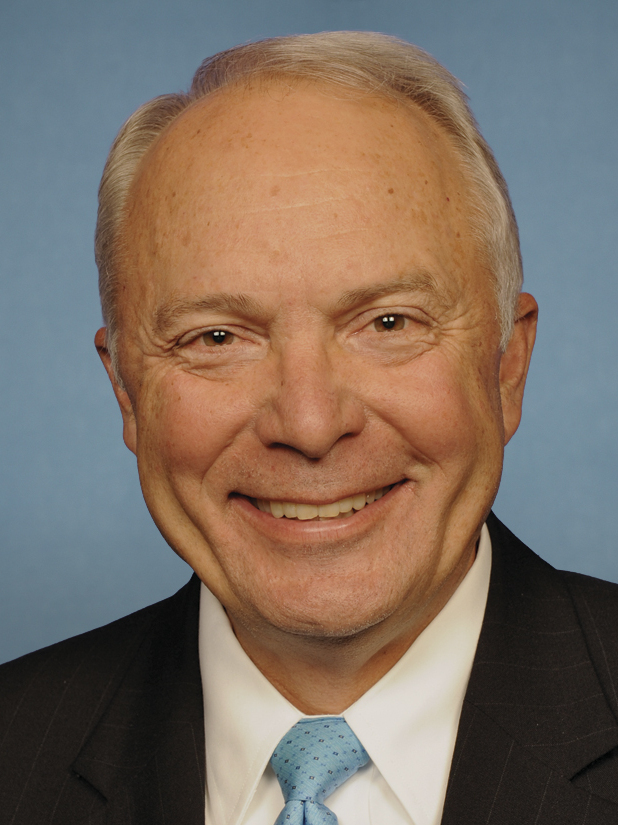

Nominee	John Kline	Mike Obermueller
Party	Republican	Democratic (DFL)
Popular vote	193,587	164,338
Percentage	54.0%	45.9%
- Precinct results Kline: 50–60% 60–70% 70–80% Obermueller: 40–50% 50–60% 60–70% 70–80% >90% Tie: 40–50% No votes
U.S. Representative before election
John Kline
Republican
Elected U.S. Representative
John Kline
Republican

Republican John Kline, who had represented Minnesota's 2nd congressional district since 2003, sought re-election.

In redistricting, Le Sueur County and Rice County were moved from the 2nd district to the 1st, and Carver County was moved from the 2nd district to the 3rd and 6th, while West St. Paul and parts of South St. Paul were moved from the 4th district to the 2nd. The 2nd district was made slightly more favorable to Democrats, but continues to favor Republicans.

=== Republican primary ===
==== Candidates ====
===== Nominee =====
- John Kline, incumbent U.S. representative

===== Eliminated in primary =====
- David Gerson, engineer

==== Results ====
Republican primary election
Party	Candidate	Votes	%
Republican	John Kline (incumbent)	15,859	85.1
Republican	David Gerson	2,772	14.9
Total votes		18,631	100.0

=== Democratic primary ===
Patrick Ganey, a member of the Northfield City Council; Kathleen Gaylord, a member of the Dakota County Commission; former state Representative Mike Obermueller; and Dan Powers, a former small business owner who unsuccessfully sought the DFL nomination in the 2nd district in 2010, sought the Democratic-Farmer-Labor Party nomination to challenge Kline. At the congressional district convention, the party endorsed Mike Obermueller.

==== Candidates ====
===== Nominee =====
- Mike Obermueller, former state representative from legislative district 38B (2009–2011)

===== Withdrawn =====
- Patrick Ganey, Northfield City Council member
- Kathleen Gaylord, Dakota County Commission member
- Dan Powers, former small business owner candidate for this seat in 2010

==== Results ====
Democratic primary results
Party	Candidate	Votes	%
Democratic (DFL)	Mike Obermueller	11,628	100.0
Total votes		11,628	100.0

=== General election ===
==== Endorsements ====
John Kline (R)

Organizations

- Campaign for Working Families
- National Right to Life Committee
- NRA Political Victory Fund
- United States Chamber of Commerce
Mike Obermueller (DFL)

Labor unions

- AFL-CIO
- American Federation of State, County and Municipal Employees
- Education Minnesota
- National Association of Letter Carriers
- Service Employees International Union
- United Steelworkers

Organizations

- Democratic Congressional Campaign Committee "Red to Blue" Program
- Planned Parenthood Action Fund
- Sierra Club

==== Polling ====
Poll source	Date(s) administered	Sample size	Margin of error	John Kline (R)	Mike Obermueller (DFL)	Undecided
SurveyUSA	October 17–18, 2012	565	±4.2%	49%	41%	11%

==== Predictions ====
Source	Ranking	As of
The Cook Political Report	Likely R	November 5, 2012
Rothenberg	Safe R	November 2, 2012
Roll Call	Likely R	November 4, 2012
Sabato's Crystal Ball	Likely R	November 5, 2012
NY Times	Lean R	November 4, 2012
RCP	Safe R	November 4, 2012
The Hill	Likely R	November 4, 2012

==== Results ====
Despite a strong challenge from Obermueller, Kline prevailed.

Minnesota's 2nd congressional district, 2012
Party	Candidate	Votes	%
Republican	John Kline (incumbent)	193,587	54.0
Democratic (DFL)	Mike Obermueller	164,338	45.9
Write-in		521	0.1
Total votes		358,446	100.0
Republican hold			

==== Finances ====
===== Campaigns =====
Candidate (party)	Raised	Spent	Cash on hand
John Kline (R)	$2,352,676	$1,957,356	$565,590
Mike Obermueller (DFL)	$717,173	$705,166	$12,007

===== Outside Spending =====
Candidate (party)	Supported	Opposed
John Kline (R)	$1,590	$74,348
Mike Obermueller (DFL)	$3,219	$0

== District 3 ==
2012 Minnesota's 3rd congressional district election
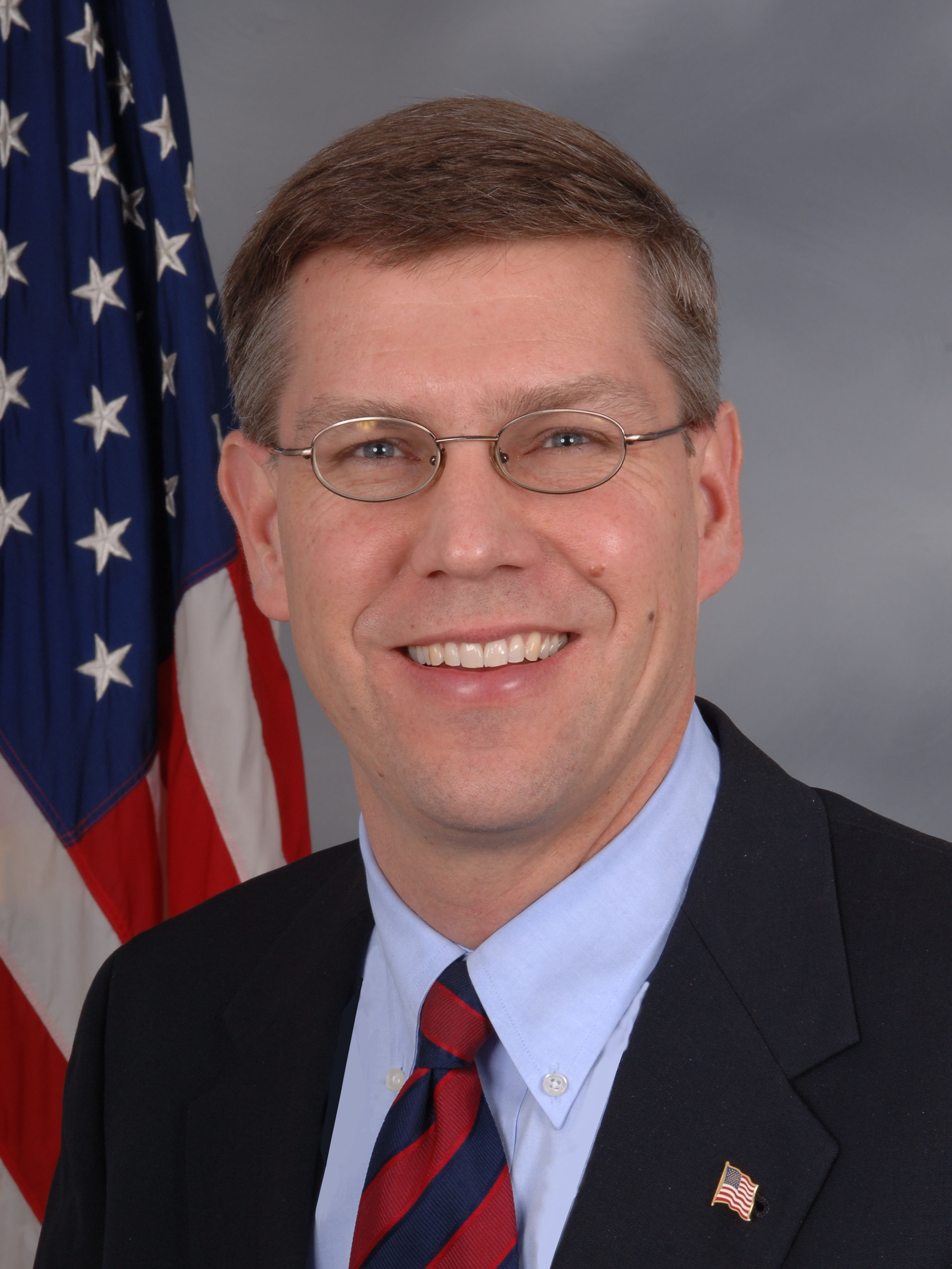

Nominee	Erik Paulsen	Brian Barnes
Party	Republican	Democratic (DFL)
Popular vote	222,335	159,937
Percentage	58.1%	41.8%
- Precinct results Paulsen: 40–50% 50–60% 60–70% 70–80% >90% Barnes: 40–50% 50–60% 60–70% 70–80% No votes
U.S. Representative before election
Erik Paulsen
Republican
Elected U.S. Representative
Erik Paulsen
Republican

Republican Erik Paulsen, who had represented Minnesota's 3rd congressional district since 2009 sought re-election.

In redistricting, the 3rd district was expanded to include eastern Carver County, while part of the northeastern Minneapolis–Saint Paul metro area was moved to the 5th. The district was made more favorable to Republicans.

=== Republican primary ===
==== Candidates ====
===== Nominee =====
- Erik Paulsen, incumbent U.S. representative

===== Eliminated in primary =====
- John W. Howard III, biologist

==== Results ====
Republican primary election
Party	Candidate	Votes	%
Republican	Erik Paulsen (incumbent)	18,672	90.2
Republican	John W. Howard III	2,032	9.8
Total votes		20,704	100.0

=== Democratic primary ===
Brian Barnes, an Edina businessman and former Navy Reserve officer and Sharon Sund, a Plymouth scientist and small-business owner sought the Democratic-Farmer-Labor Party nomination to challenge Paulsen. In the third district Democratic convention, Barnes won the party endorsement and Sund backed his candidacy. Sund was subsequently elected chair of the Hennepin County Democratic-Farmer-Labor Party.

==== Candidates ====
===== Nominee =====
- Brian Barnes, businessman and former Navy Reserve officer

===== Withdrawn =====
- Sharon Sund, Plymouth scientist and small-business owner

==== Results ====
Democratic primary results
Party	Candidate	Votes	%
Democratic (DFL)	Brian Barnes	11,786	100.0
Total votes		11,786	100.0

=== General election ===
==== Endorsements ====
Erik Paulsen (R)

Organizations

- Campaign for Working Families
- National Right to Life Committee
- NRA Political Victory Fund
- United States Chamber of Commerce
Brian Barnes (DFL)

Labor unions

- AFL-CIO
- American Federation of State, County and Municipal Employees
- Education Minnesota
- National Education Association
- Service Employees International Union
- United Steelworkers

Organizations

- National Organization for Women
- Stonewall Democrats

==== Predictions ====
Source	Ranking	As of
The Cook Political Report	Safe R	November 5, 2012
Rothenberg	Safe R	November 2, 2012
Roll Call	Safe R	November 4, 2012
Sabato's Crystal Ball	Safe R	November 5, 2012
NY Times	Safe R	November 4, 2012
RCP	Safe R	November 4, 2012
The Hill	Safe R	November 4, 2012

==== Results ====
Paulsen received 58% of the vote, defeating Barnes, who received 42%.

Minnesota's 3rd congressional district, 2012
Party	Candidate	Votes	%
Republican	Erik Paulsen (incumbent)	222,335	58.1
Democratic (DFL)	Brian Barnes	159,937	41.8
Write-in		433	0.1
Total votes		382,705	100.0
Republican hold			

==== Finances ====
===== Campaigns =====
Candidate (party)	Raised	Spent	Cash on hand
Erik Paulsen (R)	$3,113,793	$2,567,483	$693,846
Brian Barnes (DFL)	$400,435	$397,940	$2,494

===== Outside Spending =====
Candidate (party)	Supported	Opposed
Erik Paulsen (R)	$5,074	$0
Brian Barnes (DFL)	$924	$0

== District 4 ==
2012 Minnesota's 4th congressional district election
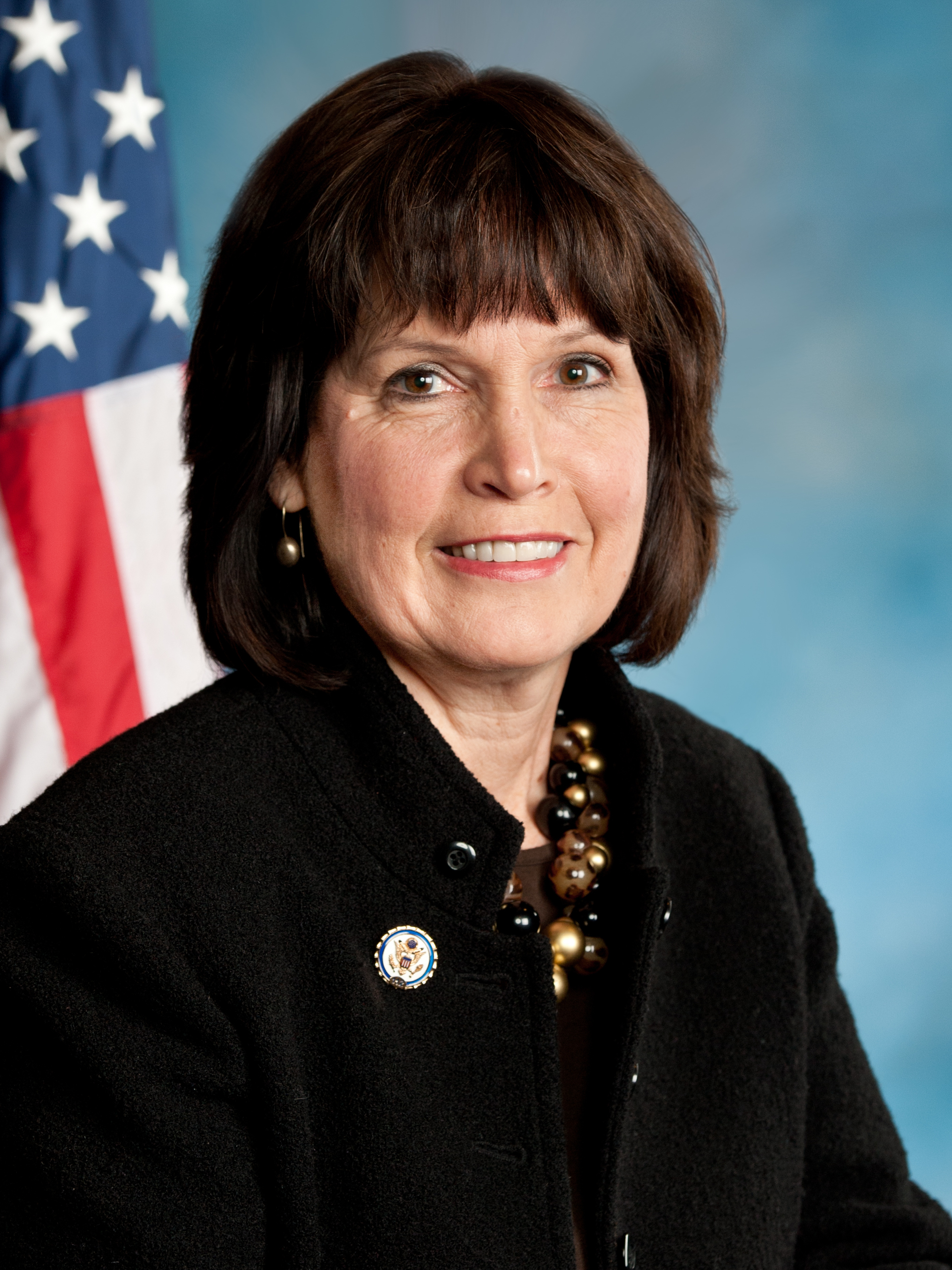

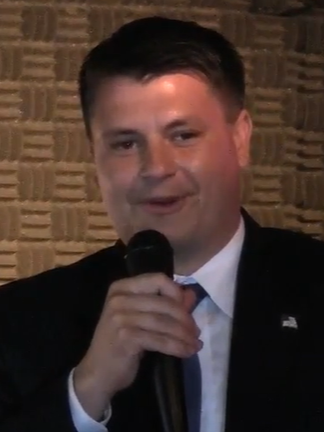

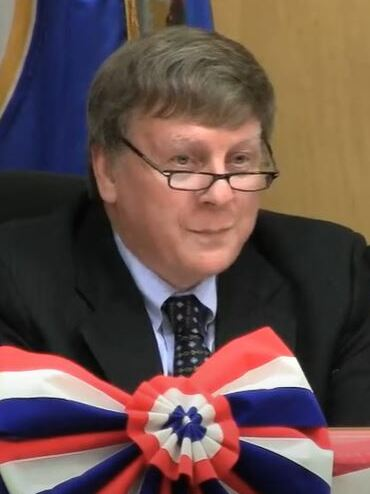
Nominee	Betty McCollum	Tony Hernandez	Steve Carlson
Party	Democratic (DFL)	Republican	Independence
Popular vote	216,685	109,659	21,135
Percentage	62.3%	31.5%	6.1%
- Precinct results McCollum: 40–50% 50–60% 60–70% 70–80% 80–90% Hernandez: 40–50% 50–60% 60–70% Tie: 50% No votes
U.S. Representative before election
Betty McCollum
Democratic (DFL)
Elected U.S. Representative
Betty McCollum
Democratic (DFL)

Democrat Betty McCollum, who had represented Minnesota's 4th congressional district since 2001, sought re-election. In redistricting, the 4th district was made slightly more favorable to Republicans, but continues to strongly favor Democrats.

The home of Republican U.S. Representative Michele Bachmann, who had represented Minnesota's 6th congressional district since 2007, was drawn into the 4th district in redistricting; however, Bachmann sought re-election in the 6th district.

McCollum retained her seat, defeating Hernandez.

=== Democratic primary ===
==== Candidates ====
===== Nominee =====
- Betty McCollum, incumbent U.S. representative

===== Eliminated in primary =====
- Diana Longrie, former mayor of Maplewood (2005–2009)
- Brian Stalboerger, software engineer

==== Results ====
Democratic primary results
Party	Candidate	Votes	%
Democratic (DFL)	Betty McCollum (incumbent)	27,291	84.2
Democratic (DFL)	Diana Longrie	3,212	9.9
Democratic (DFL)	Brian Stalboerger	1,913	5.9
Total votes		32,416	100.0

=== Republican primary ===
==== Candidates ====
===== Nominee =====
- Tony Hernandez, businessman and candidate for Senate in 2012

===== Eliminated in primary =====
- Ron Seiford, adjunct business instructor at Globe College

===== Withdrawn =====
- Dan Flood, retired Navy officer

===== Declined =====
- Michele Bachmann, incumbent U.S. representative for the 6th district

==== Results ====
Republican primary results
Party	Candidate	Votes	%
Republican	Tony Hernandez	6,876	64.1
Republican	Ron Seiford	3,856	35.9
Total votes		10,732	100.0

=== Independence primary ===
==== Candidates ====
===== Nominee =====
- Steve Carlson, development consultant, attorney and nominee for this seat in 2010

==== Results ====
Independence primary results
Party	Candidate	Votes	%
Independence	Steve Carlson	545	100.0
Total votes		545	100.0

=== General election ===
==== Endorsements ====
Betty McCollum (DFL)

Labor unions

- AFL-CIO
- American Federation of State, County and Municipal Employees
- Education Minnesota
- National Association of Letter Carriers
- National Education Association
- Service Employees International Union
- United Steelworkers

Organizations

- Citizens for Global Solutions
- Clean Water Action
- Feminist Majority
- Humane Society of the United States
- J Street
- National Organization for Women
- Planned Parenthood Action Fund
- Sierra Club
- Stonewall Democrats
Tony Hernandez (R)

Organizations

- Republican Liberty Caucus

==== Predictions ====
Source	Ranking	As of
The Cook Political Report	Safe D	November 5, 2012
Rothenberg	Safe D	November 2, 2012
Roll Call	Safe D	November 4, 2012
Sabato's Crystal Ball	Safe D	November 5, 2012
NY Times	Safe D	November 4, 2012
RCP	Safe D	November 4, 2012
The Hill	Safe D	November 4, 2012

==== Results ====
Minnesota's 4th congressional district, 2012
Party	Candidate	Votes	%
Democratic (DFL)	Betty McCollum (incumbent)	216,685	62.3
Republican	Tony Hernandez	109,659	31.5
Independence	Steve Carlson	21,135	6.1
Write-in		512	0.1
Total votes		347,991	100.0
Democratic (DFL) hold			

==== Finances ====
===== Campaigns =====
Candidate (party)	Raised	Spent	Cash on hand
Betty McCollum (DFL)	$931,990	$942,684	$48,014
Tony Hernandez (R)	$66,697	$68,016	$15
Steve Carlson (I)	Unreported		

===== Outside Spending =====
Candidate (party)	Supported	Opposed
Betty McCollum (DFL)	$1,334	$0
Tony Hernandez (R)	$2,752	$0
Steve Carlson (I)	$0	$0

== District 5 ==
2012 Minnesota's 5th congressional district election
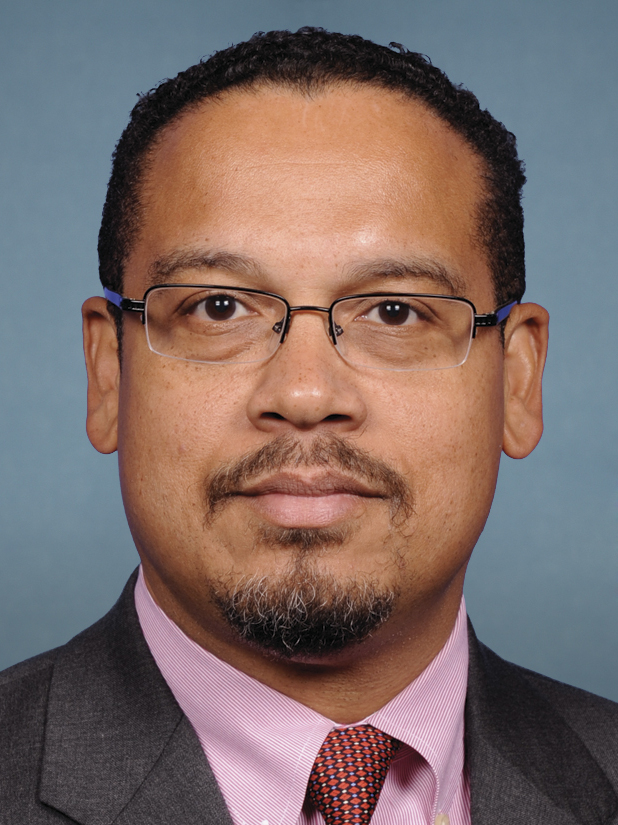

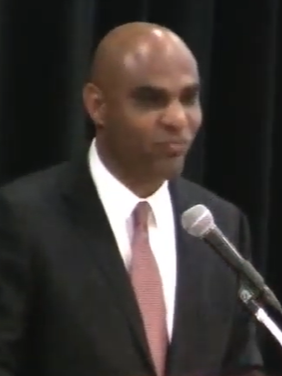
Nominee	Keith Ellison	Chris Fields
Party	Democratic (DFL)	Republican
Popular vote	262,102	88,753
Percentage	74.5%	25.2%
- Precinct results Ellison: 50–60% 60–70% 70–80% 80–90% >90% Fields: 50–60% No votes
U.S. Representative before election
Keith Ellison
Democratic (DFL)
Elected U.S. Representative
Keith Ellison
Democratic (DFL)

Minnesota's 5th congressional district has been represented by Democrat Keith Ellison since 2007. Gary Boisclair, an anti-abortion activist, and Gregg Iverson unsuccessfully challenged Ellison in the Democratic primary. In redistricting, the 5th district was expanded to include parts of Brooklyn Center, Edina and Minnetonka, and continued to strongly favor Democrats.

=== Democratic primary ===
==== Candidates ====
===== Nominee =====
- Keith Ellison, incumbent U.S. representative

===== Eliminated in primary =====
- Gary Boisclair, anti-abortion activist
- Gregg A. Iverson, perennial candidate and U.S. Army veteran

==== Results ====
Democratic primary results
Party	Candidate	Votes	%
Democratic (DFL)	Keith Ellison (incumbent)	30,609	89.6
Democratic (DFL)	Gregg A. Iverson	2,143	6.3
Democratic (DFL)	Gary Boisclair	1,397	4.1
Total votes		34,149	100.0

=== Republican primary ===
==== Candidates ====
===== Nominee =====
- Chris Fields, retired U.S. Marine

===== Withdrawn =====
- Lynne Torgerson, attorney, Independent candidate for State House, District 59A in 2008 and Independent candidate for this seat in 2010

==== Results ====
Republican primary results
Party	Candidate	Votes	%
Republican	Chris Fields	5,966	100.0
Total votes		5,966	100.0

=== General election ===
==== Endorsements ====
Keith Ellison (DFL)

Labor unions

- AFL-CIO
- Education Minnesota
- National Association of Letter Carriers
- National Education Association

Organizations

- Clean Water Action
- Feminist Majority
- Humane Society of the United States
- J Street
- NARAL Pro-Choice America
- National Organization for Women
- Planned Parenthood Action Fund
- Sierra Club
- Stonewall Democrats
Chris Fields (R)

Organizations

- Republican Liberty Caucus

==== Predictions ====
Source	Ranking	As of
The Cook Political Report	Safe D	November 5, 2012
Rothenberg	Safe D	November 2, 2012
Roll Call	Safe D	November 4, 2012
Sabato's Crystal Ball	Safe D	November 5, 2012
NY Times	Safe D	November 4, 2012
RCP	Safe D	November 4, 2012
The Hill	Safe D	November 4, 2012

==== Results ====
Ellison easily defeated Fields, carrying about 75% of the vote.

Minnesota's 5th congressional district, 2012
Party	Candidate	Votes	%
Democratic (DFL)	Keith Ellison (incumbent)	262,102	74.5
Republican	Chris Fields	88,753	25.2
Write-in		1,114	0.3
Total votes		351,969	100.0
Democratic (DFL) hold			

==== Finances ====
===== Campaigns =====
Candidate (party)	Raised	Spent	Cash on hand
Keith Ellison (DFL)	$2,053,544	$2,160,554	$56,570
Chris Fields (R)	$365,441	$357,683	$7,758

===== Outside Spending =====
Candidate (party)	Supported	Opposed
Keith Ellison (DFL)	$1,842	$0
Chris Fields (R)	$2,285	$0

== District 6 ==
2012 Minnesota's 6th congressional district election
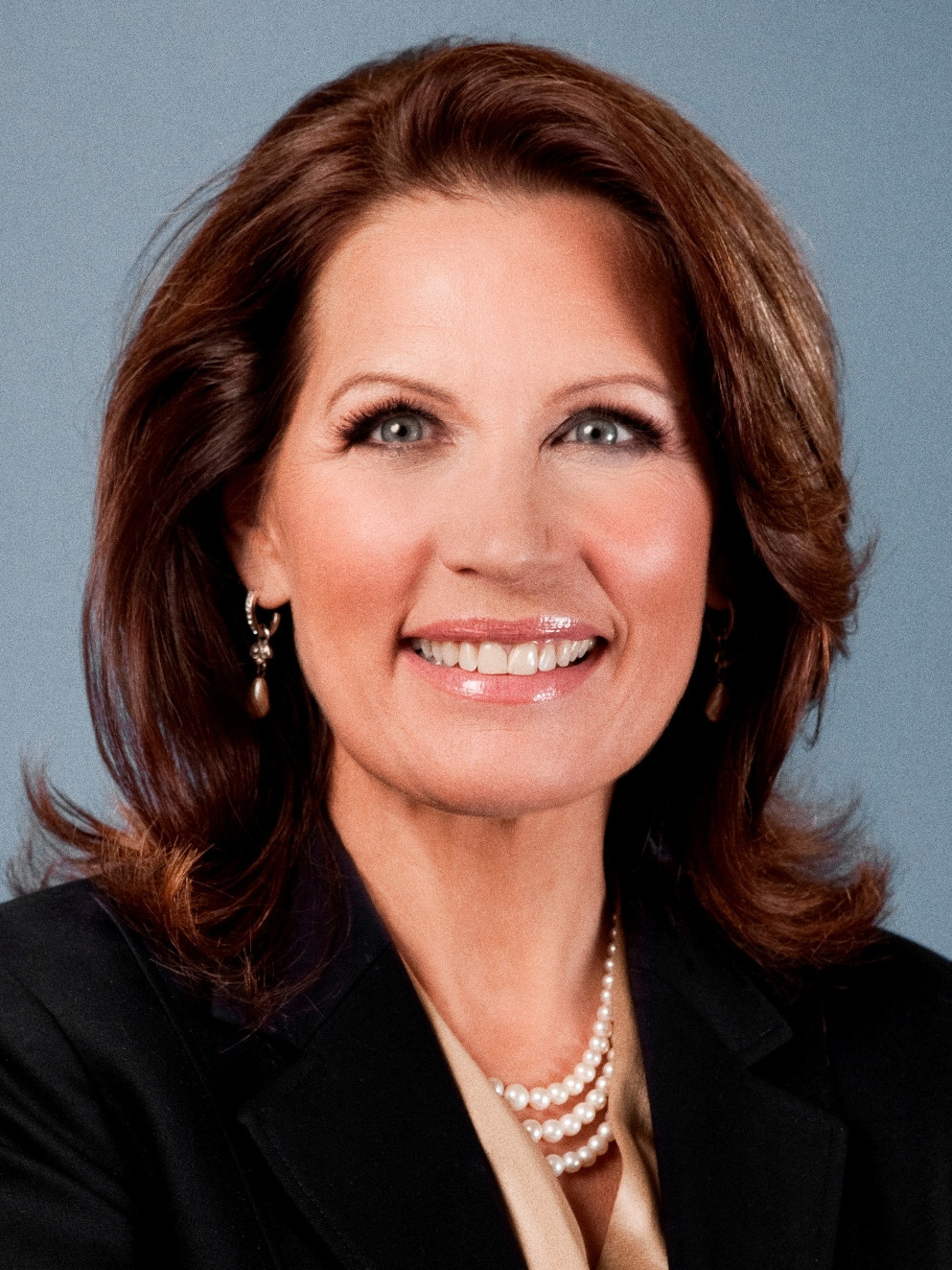

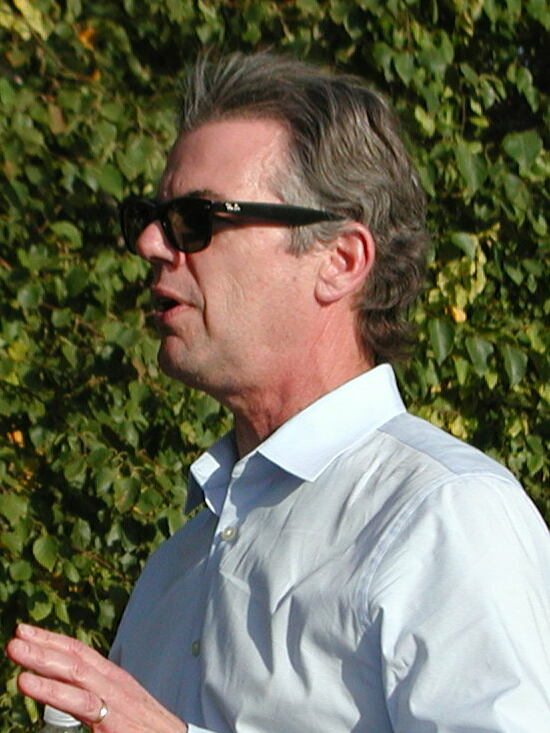
Nominee	Michele Bachmann	Jim Graves
Party	Republican	Democratic (DFL)
Popular vote	179,240	174,944
Percentage	50.5%	49.3%
- Precinct results Bachmann: 40–50% 50–60% 60–70% >90% Graves: 50–60% 60–70% 70–80% >90% Tie: 40–50% No votes
U.S. Representative before election
Michele Bachmann
Republican
Elected U.S. Representative
Michele Bachmann
Republican

Michele Bachmann, who had represented Minnesota's 6th congressional district since 2007 and unsuccessfully sought the Republican presidential nomination in 2012, sought re-election.

In redistricting, the 6th district was expanded to include Carver County and was made more favorable to Republicans.

=== Republican primary ===
Ron Seiford, an adjunct business instructor at Woodbury's Globe College, and Aubrey Immelman unsuccessfully challenged her in the Republican nomination, though Bachmann won by the lowest margin of any incumbent Republican congressional candidate in 50 years.

==== Candidates ====
===== Nominee =====
- Michele Bachmann, incumbent U.S. representative

===== Eliminated in primary =====
- Aubrey Immelman, professor, Republican candidate for this seat in 2008 and Independent candidate in 2010
- Stephen Thompson, computer consultant

===== Withdrawn =====
- Ron Seiford, adjunct business instructor at Globe College

==== Results ====
Republican primary results
Party	Candidate	Votes	%
Republican	Michele Bachmann (incumbent)	14,569	80.3
Republican	Stephen Thompson	2,322	12.8
Republican	Aubrey Immelman	1,242	6.9
Total votes		18,133	100.0

=== Democratic primary ===
Jim Graves, a hotel executive, won the Democratic-Farmer-Labor Party nomination at the party's convention in April 2012.

==== Candidates ====
===== Nominee =====
- Jim Graves, hotel executive

===== Withdrawn =====
- Brian McGoldrick, businessman
- Anne Nolan, attorney and business consultant
- Mike Starr, substitute teacher

==== Results ====
Democratic primary results
Party	Candidate	Votes	%
Democratic (DFL)	Jim Graves	8,600	100.0
Total votes		8,600	100.0

=== General election ===
==== Campaign ====
During a Minnesota Public Radio-moderated debate Graves stated that abortion is an issue between a woman, her family and her God: "I don't want the government to be involved in that process."

==== Endorsements ====
Michele Bachmann (R)

Organizations

- Campaign for Working Families
- Eagle Forum
- Maggie's List
- National Right to Life Committee
- NRA Political Victory Fund
- Susan B. Anthony List
- United States Chamber of Commerce
Jim Graves (DFL)

U.S. representatives

- Barney Frank, U.S. representative from Massachusetts's 4th congressional district (1981–present)

State officials

- Arne Carlson, former Republican Governor

Labor unions

- AFL-CIO
- American Federation of State, County and Municipal Employees
- Education Minnesota
- National Association of Letter Carriers
- National Education Association
- Service Employees International Union
- United Steelworkers

Organizations

- Democratic Congressional Campaign Committee "Red to Blue" Program

==== Debates ====
- Complete video of debate, November 4, 2012

==== Polling ====
Poll source	Date(s) administered	Sample size	Margin of error	Michele Bachmann (R)	Jim Graves (DFL)	Undecided
Pulse Opinion Research	October 16, 2012	1,000	±3.0%	51%	45%	6%
SurveyUSA	October 9–11, 2012	598	±4.1%	50%	41%	9%
Greenberg Quinlan Rosner Research Graves (DFL)	October 4–5, 2012	403	±4.9%	47%	45%	7%
Greenberg Quinlan Rosner Research Graves (DFL)	August 29–30, 2012	401	±?%	48%	46%	6%
Greenberg Quinlan Rosner Research Graves (DFL)	June 12–14, 2012	505	±4.4%	48%	43%	9%

==== Predictions ====
Source	Ranking	As of
The Cook Political Report	Lean R	November 5, 2012
Rothenberg	Lean R	November 2, 2012
Roll Call	Lean R	November 4, 2012
Sabato's Crystal Ball	Likely R	November 5, 2012
NY Times	Safe R	November 4, 2012
RCP	Lean R	November 4, 2012
The Hill	Lean R	November 4, 2012

==== Results ====
Bachmann narrowly retained the seat, receiving 4,298 more votes than Graves.

Minnesota's 6th congressional district, 2012
Party	Candidate	Votes	%
Republican	Michele Bachmann (incumbent)	179,240	50.5
Democratic (DFL)	Jim Graves	174,944	49.3
Write-in		969	0.3
Total votes		355,153	100.0
Republican hold			

==== Finances ====
===== Campaigns =====
Candidate (party)	Raised	Spent	Cash on hand
Michele Bachmann (R)	$14,995,937	$11,946,232	$2,070,568
Jim Graves (DFL)	$2,309,982	$2,279,384	$30,598

===== Outside Spending =====
Candidate (party)	Supported	Opposed
Michele Bachmann (R)	$66,397	$66,014
Jim Graves (DFL)	$2,878	$72,438

== District 7 ==
2012 Minnesota's 7th congressional district election
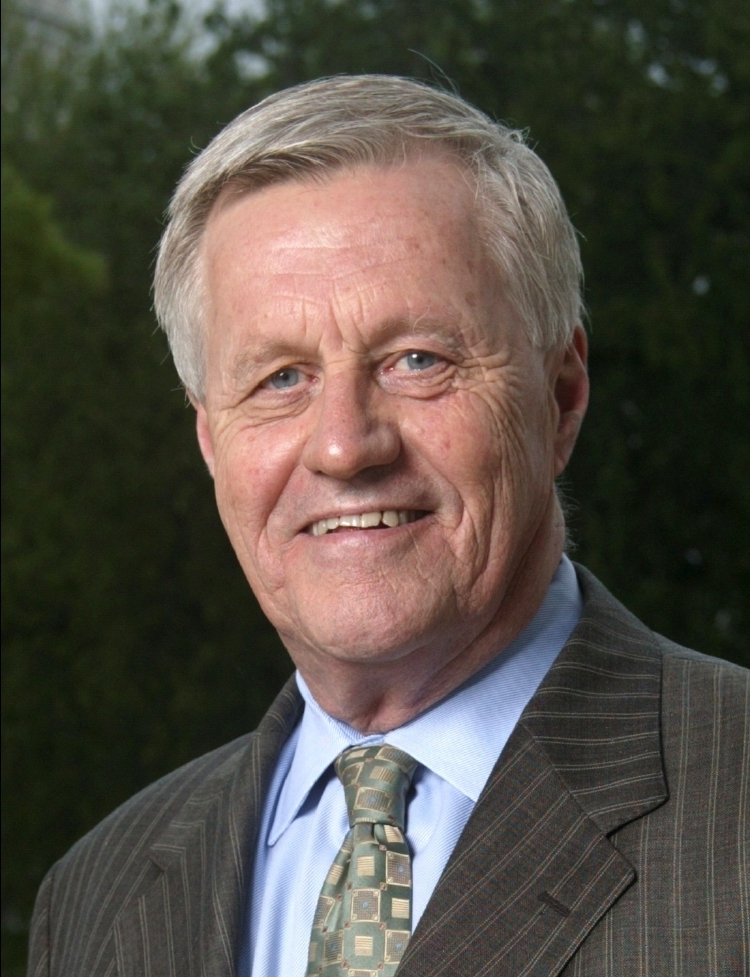

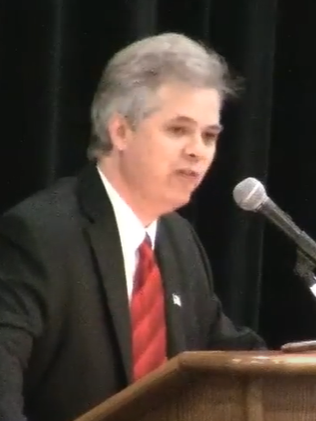
Nominee	Collin Peterson	Lee Byberg
Party	Democratic (DFL)	Republican
Popular vote	197,791	114,151
Percentage	60.4%	34.8%
- Precinct results Peterson: 40–50% 50–60% 60–70% 70–80% 80–90% >90% Byberg: 40–50% 50–60% 60–70% 70–80% 80–90% >90% Tie: 40–50% 50% No votes
U.S. Representative before election
Collin Peterson
Democratic (DFL)
Elected U.S. Representative
Collin Peterson
Democratic (DFL)

Democrat Collin Peterson, who had represented Minnesota's 7th congressional district since 1991, sought re-election. In redistricting, the 7th district was expanded to include rural counties in southern Minnesota, while cities were moved from the 6th and 8th districts into the 7th.

=== Democratic primary ===
==== Candidates ====
===== Nominee =====
- Collin Peterson, incumbent U.S. representative

=== Republican primary ===
==== Candidates ====
===== Nominee =====
- Lee Byberg, business executive and nominee for this seat in 2010

===== Withdrawn =====
- Gretchen Hoffman, state senator

=== Independence primary ===
==== Candidates ====
===== Nominee =====
- Adam Steele, tax consultant and perennial candidate

=== General election ===
==== Endorsements ====
Collin Peterson (DFL)

Labor unions

- AFL-CIO
- American Federation of State, County and Municipal Employees
- Education Minnesota
- National Association of Letter Carriers
- National Education Association
- United Steelworkers

Organizations

- NRA Political Victory Fund
Lee Byberg (R)

Organizations

- Campaign for Working Families
- Republican Liberty Caucus

==== Predictions ====
Source	Ranking	As of
The Cook Political Report	Safe D	November 5, 2012
Rothenberg	Safe D	November 2, 2012
Roll Call	Safe D	November 4, 2012
Sabato's Crystal Ball	Safe D	November 5, 2012
NY Times	Safe D	November 4, 2012
RCP	Safe D	November 4, 2012
The Hill	Likely D	November 4, 2012

==== Results ====
Minnesota's 7th congressional district, 2012
Party	Candidate	Votes	%
Democratic (DFL)	Collin Peterson (incumbent)	197,791	60.4
Republican	Lee Byberg	114,151	34.8
Independence	Adam Steele	15,298	4.7
Write-in		336	0.1
Total votes		327,576	100.0
Democratic (DFL) hold			

==== Finances ====
===== Campaigns =====
Candidate (party)	Raised	Spent	Cash on hand
Collin Peterson (DFL)	$1,129,343	$1,497,202	$34,417
Lee Byberg (R)	$583,839	$601,966	-$681
Adam Steele (I)	Unreported		

===== Outside Spending =====
Candidate (party)	Supported	Opposed
Collin Peterson (DFL)	$2,506	$0
Lee Byberg (R)	$13,449	$0
Adam Steele (I)	$0	$0

== District 8 ==
2012 Minnesota's 8th congressional district election
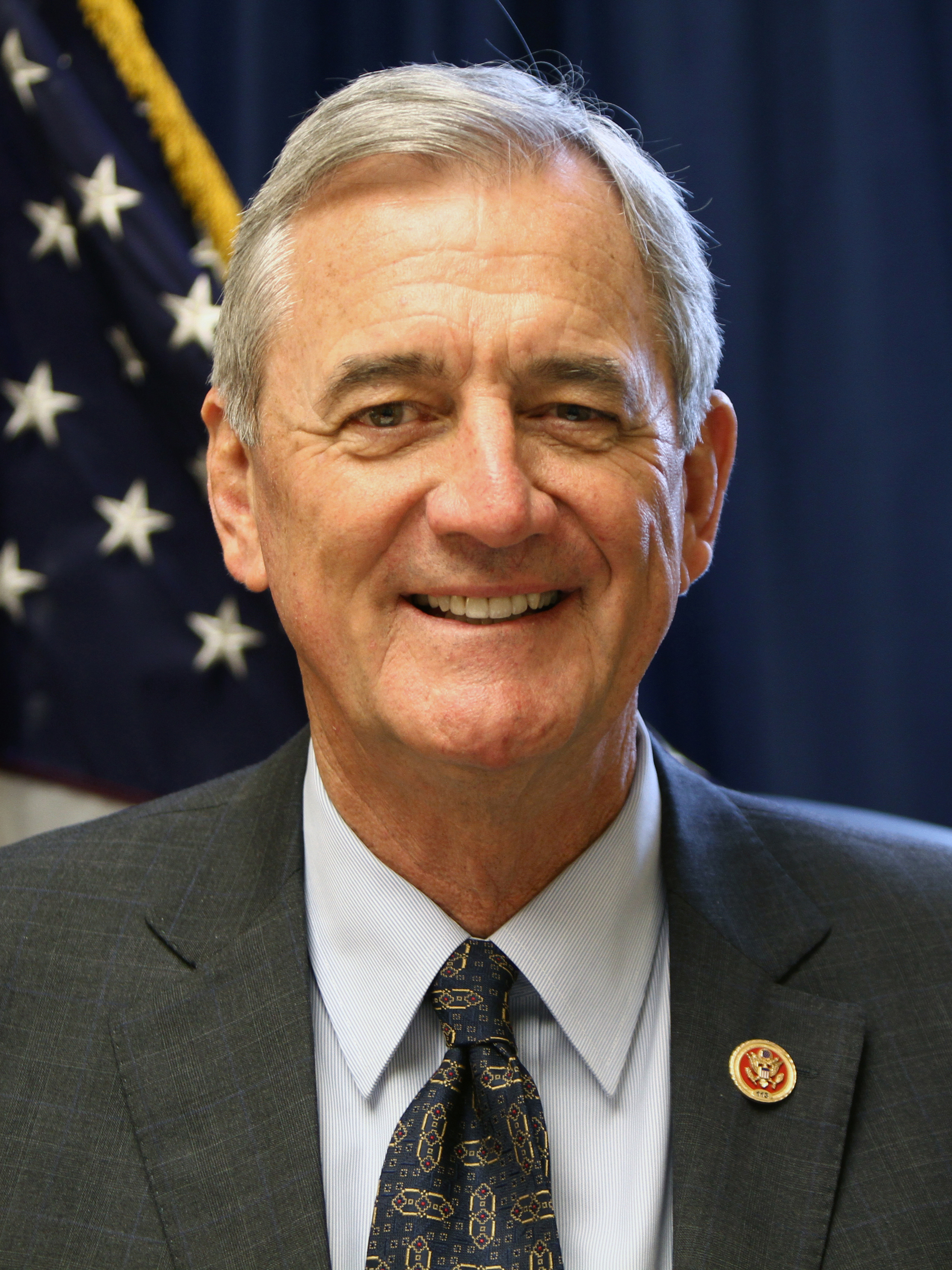

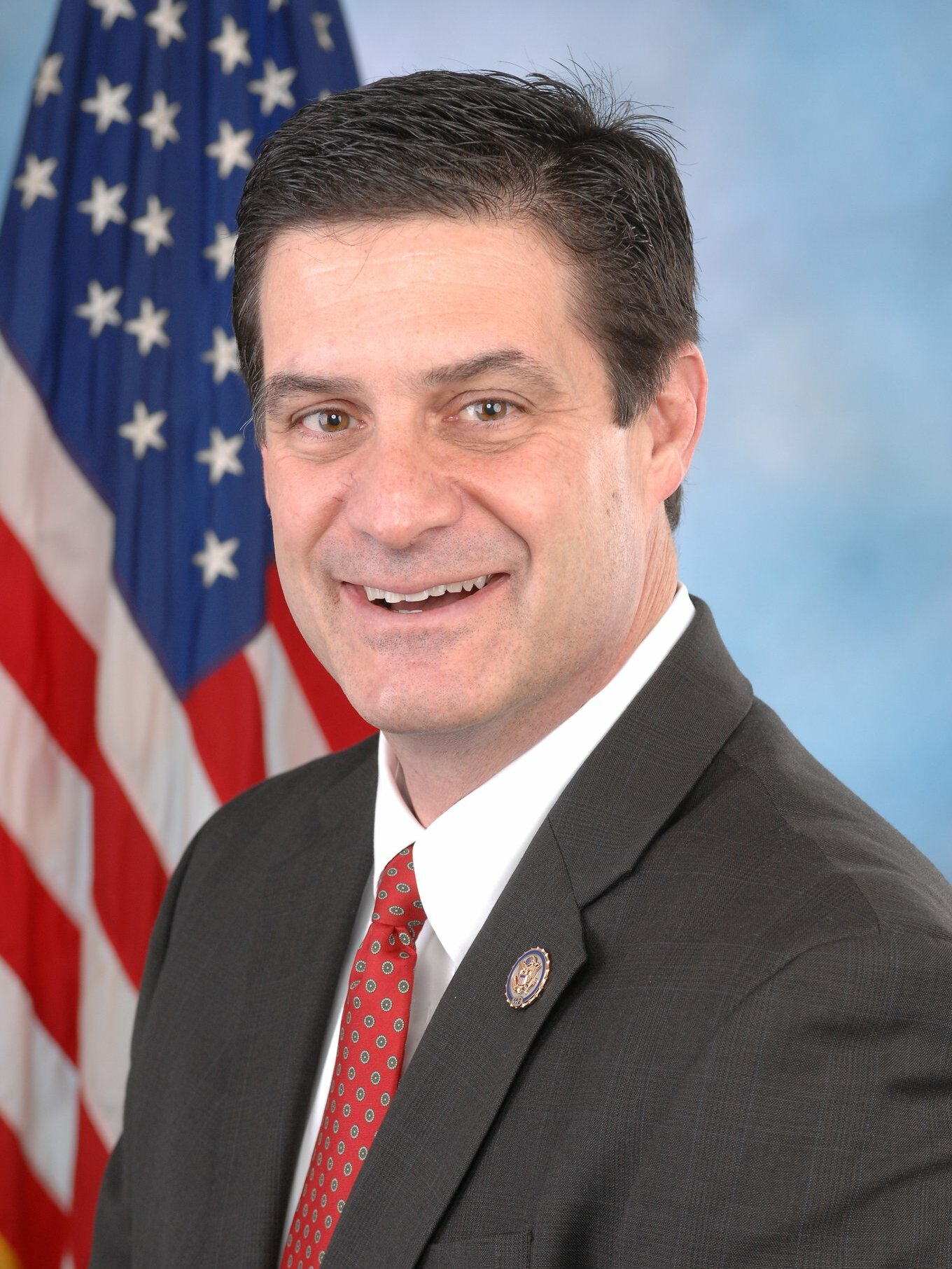
Nominee	Rick Nolan	Chip Cravaack
Party	Democratic (DFL)	Republican
Popular vote	191,976	160,520
Percentage	54.3%	45.4%
- Precinct results Nolan: 50–60% 60–70% 70–80% 80–90% >90% Cravaack: 40–50% 50–60% 60–70% 70–80% 80–90% >90% Tie: 40–50% 50% No votes
U.S. Representative before election
Chip Cravaack
Republican
Elected U.S. Representative
Rick Nolan
Democratic (DFL)

Republican Chip Cravaack, who was first elected to represent Minnesota's 8th congressional district in 2010, sought re-election.

In redistricting, the 8th district was not significantly changed and remained competitive.

Cravaack was endorsed by the Mesabi Daily News in Virginia and the Duluth News Tribune. On November 6, he lost his seat to former Democratic congressman Rick Nolan, 54% to 45%.

=== Republican primary ===
==== Candidates ====
===== Nominee =====
- Chip Cravaack, incumbent U.S. representative

==== Results ====
Republican primary results
Party	Candidate	Votes	%
Republican	Chip Cravaack (incumbent)	20,471	100.0
Total votes		20,471	100.0

=== Democratic primary ===
==== Candidates ====
===== Nominee =====
- Rick Nolan, former U.S. representative from the 6th district (1975–1981)

===== Eliminated in primary =====
- Jeff Anderson, former Duluth city councilor (2007–2011)
- Tarryl Clark, former state senator from senate district 15 (2006–2011) and nominee for the 6th district in 2010

===== Withdrawn =====
- Daniel Fanning, former deputy state director for Senator Al Franken

===== Declined =====
- Tom Bakk, minority leader of the Minnesota Senate
- Carly Melin, State representative
- Don Ness, mayor of Duluth
- Roger Reinert, state senator
- Tom Rukavina, state representative
- Anthony Sertich, former state house majority leader
- Yvonne Prettner Solon, incumbent lieutenant governor

==== Campaign ====
Nolan was victorious in a February 2012 caucus, receiving 1,537 votes to Anderson's 1,008 and Clark's 408. 269 uncommitted votes were cast.

Delegates to a convention held in May 2012 could endorse one candidate, but candidates who did not receive the party's endorsement were nonetheless able to run in the August 2012 primary.

==== Endorsements ====
Tarryl Clark

Labor unions

- United Steelworkers

Organizations

- EMILY's List
- Feminist Majority
- National Organization for Women

==== Results ====
Democratic primary results
Party	Candidate	Votes	%
Democratic (DFL)	Richard Nolan	20,840	38.3
Democratic (DFL)	Tarryl Clark	17,554	32.2
Democratic (DFL)	Jeff Anderson	16,035	29.5
Total votes		54,429	100.0

=== General election ===
==== Endorsements ====
Chip Cravaack (R)

Organizations

- Campaign for Working Families
- Gun Owners of America
- National Republican Congressional Committee "Patriot" Program
- National Right to Life Committee
- NRA Political Victory Fund
- United States Chamber of Commerce
Rick Nolan (DFL)

Labor unions

- AFL-CIO
- American Federation of State, County and Municipal Employees
- Education Minnesota
- National Association of Letter Carriers
- National Education Association
- Service Employees International Union

Organizations

- Council for a Livable World
- Democratic Congressional Campaign Committee "Red to Blue" Program
- Planned Parenthood Action Fund
- Progressive Change Campaign Committee

==== Debates ====
- Complete video of debate, October 12, 2012

==== Polling ====
Poll source	Date(s) administered	Sample size	Margin of error	Chip Cravaack (R)	Rick Nolan (DFL)	Undecided
SurveyUSA	November 1–3, 2012	585	±4.1%	45%	47%	8%
Public Policy Polling	October 25–26, 2012	1,020	±3.8%	44%	48%	8%
OnMessage (R-Cravaack)	October 24–25, 2012	400	±4.9%	50%	40%	10%
Pulse Opinion Research	October 16, 2012	1,000	±3.0%	43%	50%	7%
Victoria Research (D-Nolan)	October 7–8, 2012	400	±4.9%	44%	48%	8%
Global Strategy Group (D-DCCC)	October 4–7, 2012	405	±4.9%	42%	42%	16%
SurveyUSA	September 6–9, 2012	578	±4.3%	45%	46%	9%
GBA Strategies (D-House Majority PAC)	August 26–27, 2012	400	±4.9%	44%	47%	9%
Global Strategy Group (D-DCCC)	August 21–29, 2012	400	±4.9%	44%	45%	11%

==== Predictions ====
Source	Ranking	As of
The Cook Political Report	Tossup	November 5, 2012
Rothenberg	Tossup	November 2, 2012
Roll Call	Tossup	November 4, 2012
Sabato's Crystal Ball	Lean D (flip)	November 5, 2012
NY Times	Tossup	November 4, 2012
RCP	Tossup	November 4, 2012
The Hill	Tossup	November 4, 2012

==== Results ====
Nolan triumphed over Cravaack, receiving 54% of the vote.

Minnesota's 8th congressional district, 2012
Party	Candidate	Votes	%
Democratic (DFL)	Rick Nolan	191,976	54.3
Republican	Chip Cravaack (incumbent)	160,520	45.4
Write-in		1,167	0.3
Total votes		353,663	100.0
Democratic (DFL) gain from Republican			

==== Finances ====
===== Campaigns =====
Candidate (party)	Raised	Spent	Cash on hand
Chip Cravaack (R)	$2,374,760	$2,377,366	$26,314
Rick Nolan (DFL)	$1,256,440	$1,230,233	$26,208

===== Outside Spending =====
Candidate (party)	Supported	Opposed
Chip Cravaack (R)	$262,787	$4,581,449
Rick Nolan (DFL)	$600,396	$3,711,631
