= Lynn Wardlow =

American politician

Member of the Minnesota House of Representatives from the 38B district
- In office 2003–2009
- Preceded by: Tim Pawlenty
- Succeeded by: Mike Obermueller

Personal details
- Born: November 11, 1943 (age 82) Spencer, Iowa, U.S.
- Party: Republican
- Spouse: Sheryl
- Children: 2
- Education: Augustana College (BA); Minnesota State University, Mankato (MS)
- Occupation: teacher legislator military officer

Military service
- Allegiance: United States
- Branch/service: United States Marine Corps
- Years of service: 1969–1995
- Rank: Lieutenant Colonel

Lynn D. Wardlow (born November 11, 1943) is an American politician who served as a member of the Minnesota House of Representatives, where he represented District 38B from 2003 to 2009. The district includes over half of the city of Eagan in Dakota County, which is in the southeastern part of the Twin Cities metropolitan area. A Republican, he was elected to the open seat vacated by Minnesota Governor Tim Pawlenty in 2002.

== Early life and education ==
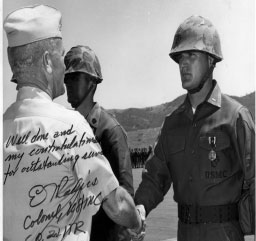
1st Lt. Lynn Wardlow receiving Navy Commendation with "Combat V"

Before running for political office, Wardlow was a middle school and high school mathematics teacher and coach for over 30 years in the Rosemount-Eagan-Apple Valley School District. He also served in Vietnam in 1969 as a lieutenant in the U.S. Marine Corps, earning two Navy Commendation Medals with one a Combat V. He retired from the Marine Corps Reserve in 1995 at the rank of lieutenant colonel. He holds a B.A. from Augustana College in Sioux Falls, South Dakota, and a M.S. in Mathematics from Minnesota State University, Mankato in Mankato.

== Career ==
As a legislator, he focused on the issues of education, transportation, tax reduction, small business promotion, and health care reform.

While in office, Wardlow served on the following House committees: E-12 Education, Early Childhood Learning Finance Division, Education Finance and Economic Competitiveness Finance Division, Mental Health Division, and Veterans Affairs Division. In the November 2008 general election, Wardlow was unseated by Democrat Mike Obermueller in his bid for a fourth term.

== Personal life ==
His son, Doug Wardlow, subsequently ran for the same seat in the 2010 general election, unseating Obermueller.
