= Temple of ECK =

Religious temple in Chanhassen, Minnesota

Coordinates: 44°52′05″N 93°33′01″W

Temple of ECK

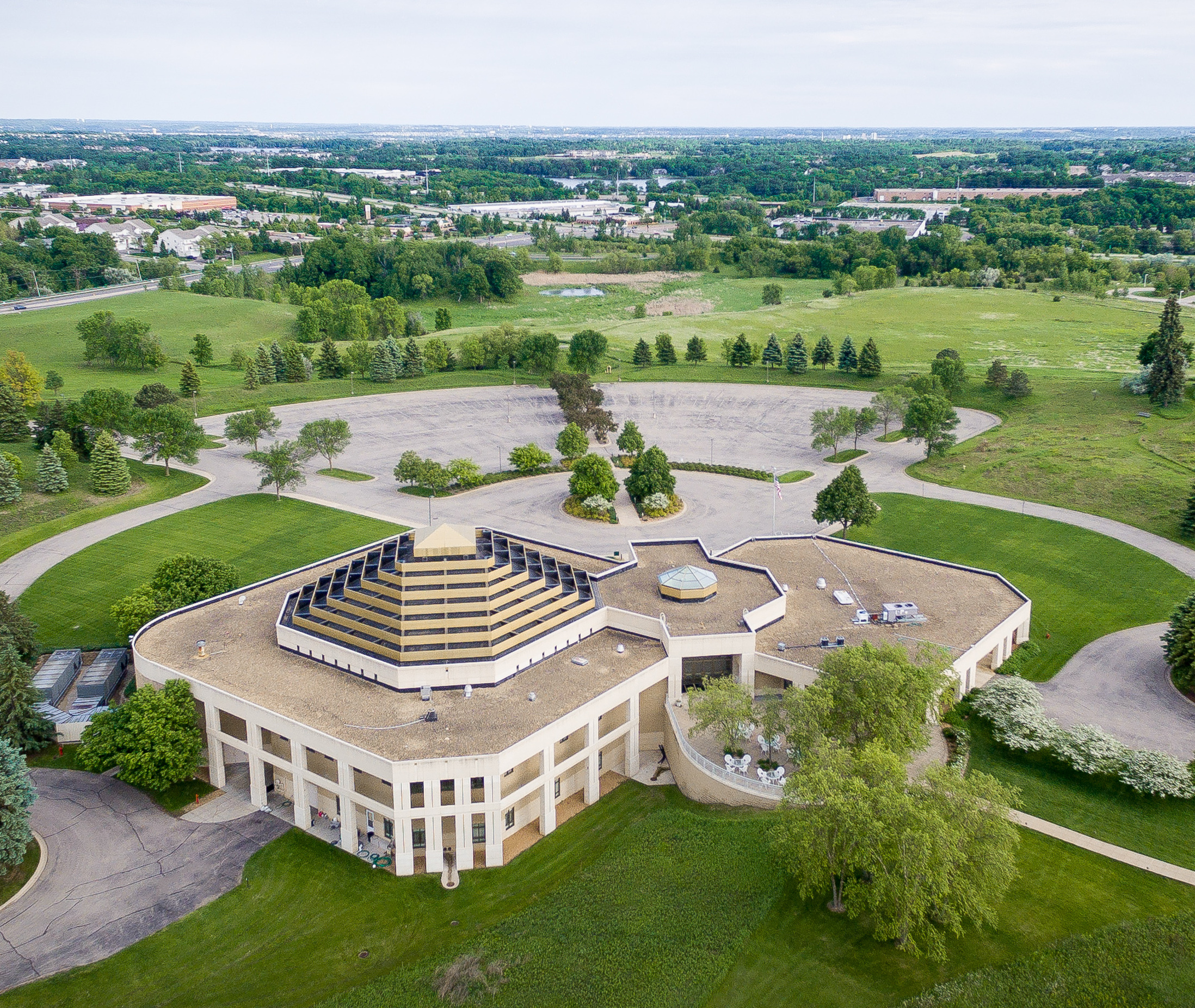
Overhead view

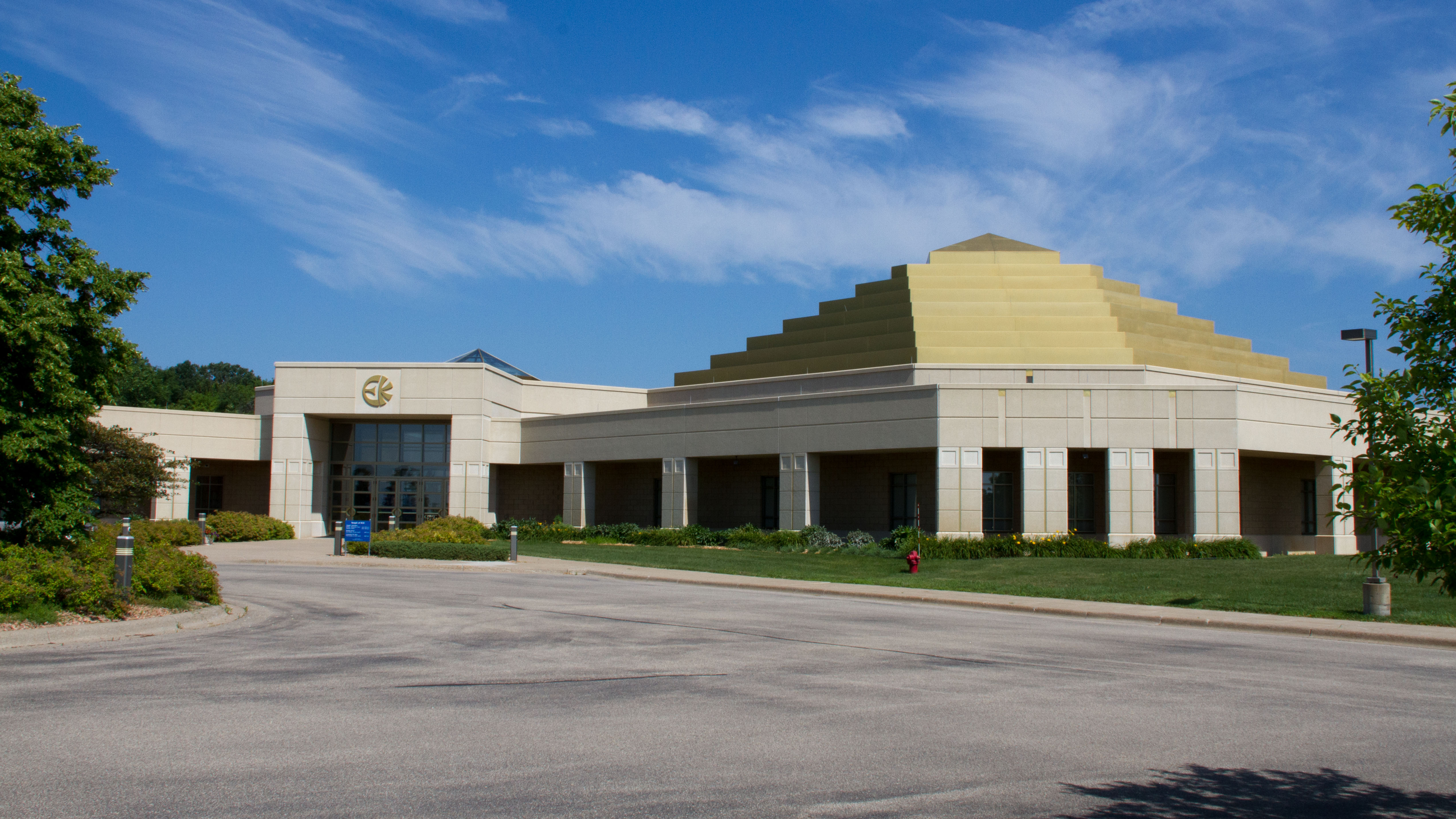
From the parking lot

The Temple of ECK is the center of the Eckankar faith in the United States. It is located near Lake Ann in Chanhassen, Minnesota, on about 174 acres (70 ha) of land. The land was purchased by the church in 1985, and the temple was built at a cost of $8.2 million, with construction beginning in 1989. The building was completed in 1990.

== Opposition ==
Five hundred residents of the Chanhassen signed a petition opposing the construction of the building. Some residents were worried about property values and an allegedly cult-like nature of the religion. Others found it to be a poor use of land, thinking it should be used for development that would create a larger tax base. 2,576 people signed a petition asking the city to purchase the land. Nonetheless, after hearing 2 1/2 hours of feedback from residents, the Chanhassen Planning Commission voted on March 1, 1989, to recommend to the city council that a construction permit be issued. The city council approved the permit for the 800-seat church on May 22, 1989.

== Building ==
Excavation began in October 1989, and the temple was dedicated a year later on October 22, 1990. Its architectural style is defined by a "golden ziggurat", though more closely resembling a pyramid, symbolizing ascension. Some 52,000 concrete blocks and 225 tons of steel were used in the building of the 50,000-square-foot (4,600 m^{2}) temple. The building contains classrooms, worship spaces, and other meeting areas. As of 2018, photos of the religion's then leader, Harold Klemp, hung in every room. A golden "EK" emblem sits above the main glass doors. The main 8,000-square foot sanctuary has seating for 800 people and a 1,000-square foot stage. A large, six-pointed stained glass blue star representing the Holy Spirit is on the ceiling.

The temple sits on 173 acres (70 ha) of land, making Eckankar the fourth-largest landowner in the city. Some 2 miles (3.2 km) of prairie walking paths for contemplation are open to the public.

Prior to the construction of the temple, the Eckankar headquarters were in New Hope, Minnesota.
