= Jim Graves =

American hotel founder

Personal details
- Born: September 27, 1953 (age 73) St. Cloud, Minnesota
- Party: Democratic-Farmer-Labor
- Education: St. Cloud State University (BS)
- Occupation: Businessman
- Website: Jim Graves for Congress

James Joseph Graves (born September 27, 1953) is an American businessman and founder of the nationwide AmericInn hotel franchise. He was the Democratic Party nominee for the United States House of Representatives in Minnesota's 6th congressional district in 2012, challenging Republican incumbent Michele Bachmann.

A native of Minnesota, Graves graduated from St. Cloud State University with a BS in education. He worked as a teacher prior to founding the AmericInn in Rogers, Minnesota in 1979. As CEO, Graves grew the hotel from a small business to a nationwide hotel franchise. In 1993 he also co-founded the Graves Hospitality Corporation in Minneapolis. His luxury Graves 601 Hotel is rated by Travel + Leisure as one of the world's top 500 accommodations.

Graves gained national attention during his competitive congressional race against Republican incumbent Michele Bachmann in 2012. Despite being outspent by a 12 to 1 margin in Minnesota's most conservative district, Graves lost the general election by 4,300 votes, or less than one-percent. In 2013, he announced his candidacy for Minnesota's 6th congressional district. On May 31, 2013, Graves announced that he was suspending his campaign indefinitely.

Graves was inducted into the Twin Cities Business Hall of Fame in 2015.

== Early life and education ==
Born in St. Cloud, Minnesota, Graves attended Cathedral High School before earning a Bachelor of Science degree in education from St. Cloud State University. During college, he and his wife performed as professional musicians and folk music singers.

== Professional background ==
Graves worked as a teacher at Holy Spirit Elementary School in St. Cloud for two years prior to entering business. In 1979 he founded AmericInn as a small business that expanded into a nationwide chain, and in 1993, began the luxury Graves Hospitality Corporation with his son.

== 2012 campaign ==
In 2012, Graves received the Democratic Party nomination for the U.S. House of Representatives and began attracting national media attention after polls showed he was a competitive challenger to Congresswoman Michele Bachmann. Graves donated more than $500,000 to his own campaign.

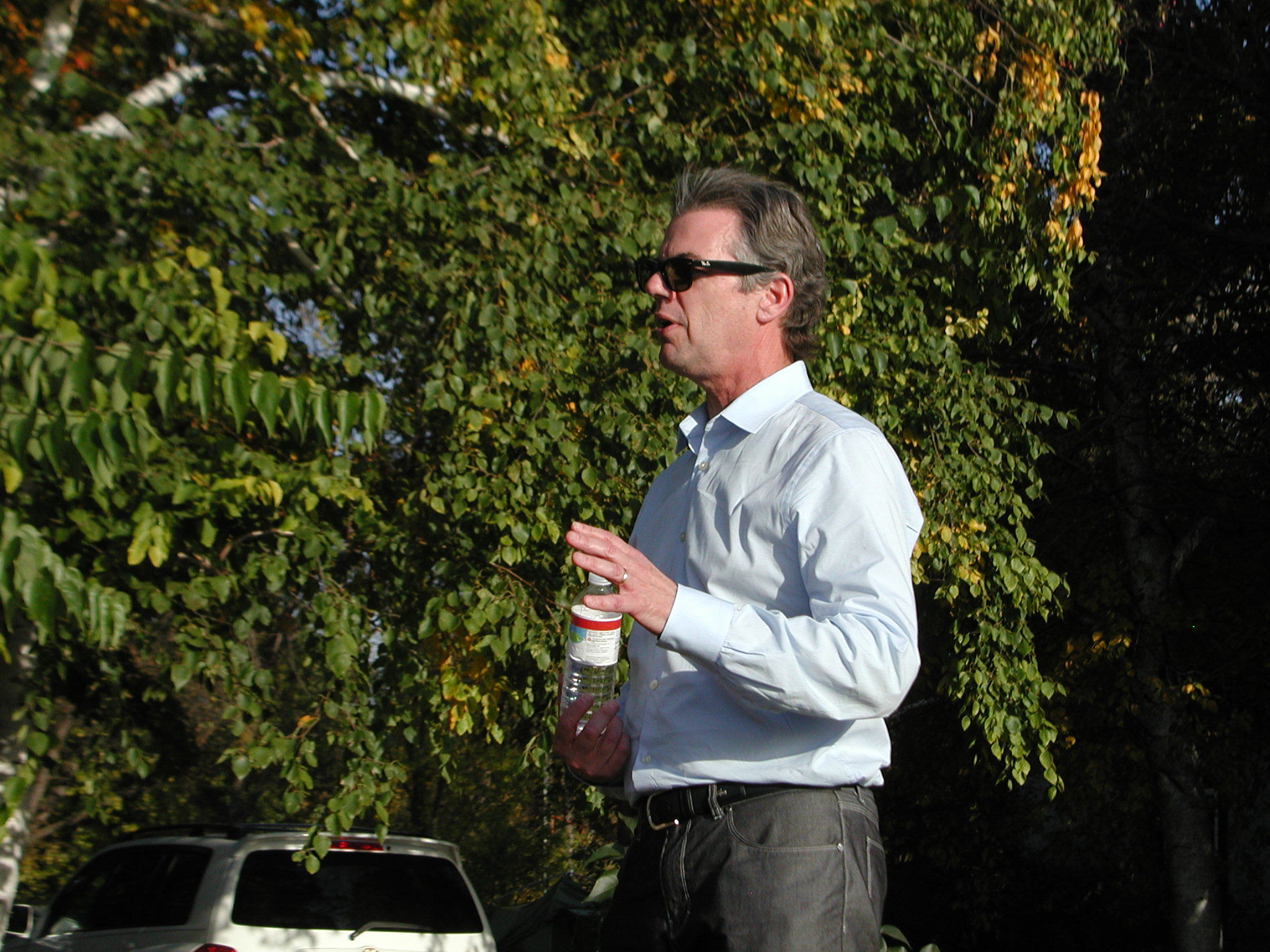
Jim Graves speaks to crowd at Buffalo, MN, Sep 29, 2012

Graves' campaign received bipartisan support across the political spectrum. He was endorsed by former Republican Governor Arne Carlson of Minnesota, former Minnesota Independence Party Gubernatorial Candidate Tom Horner, and Massachusetts Democratic Congressman Barney Frank, among others.

Graves came close to pulling off an upset victory against Rep. Bachmann, in what was one of the costliest congressional races in history. He lost by just one percent, despite being outspent twelve to one in what is widely considered Minnesota's most conservative district.

On the issue of abortion, during his 2012 campaign with Rep. Bachmann, Graves revealed he is pro-choice, stating during a Minnesota Public Radio-moderated debate that abortion is an issue between a woman, her family and her God: "I don't want the government to be involved in that process."

== 2014 campaign ==
On April 11, 2013, Graves' campaign manager announced Graves' intention to run for the House of Representatives again in 2014, remaining in the sixth district.

After Rep. Bachmann decided not to run again, Graves announced that he was not running in 2014.

== Personal ==
Graves is Catholic and has three sons with his wife, Julie. Graves has a net worth estimated between $22 million and $111 million (USD).
