= Lake Ann (Minnesota) =

Lake in the state of Minnesota, United States

- Location of Lake Ann in the state of Minnesota Lake Ann (the United States)
- Location: Carver County, Minnesota
- Coordinates: 44°52′15″N 93°33′35″W
- Type: Mesotrophic lake
- Surface area: 119 acres (48 ha)
- Average depth: 16.8 ft (5.1 m)
- Max. depth: 40 ft (12 m)
- Water volume: 2,005 acre⋅ft (2,473,000 m^{3})
- Shore length^{1}: 1.71 mi (2.75 km)
- Settlements: Chanhassen, Minnesota
- Website: Lake Ann
- ^{1} Shore length is not a well-defined measure.

Lake Ann is a lake in Carver County, Minnesota, in the United States.

== Fishing ==
Lake Ann contains various species of fish including black, brown and yellow bullheads, banded killifish, black crappie, blackchin shiner, bluegill, central mudminnow, largemouth bass, northern pike, pumpkinseed, walleye, white sucker, yellow perch, common carp, Bluntnose minnow, golden shiner, Johnny darter, Spottail shiner as well as two species of sunfish: green and hybrid. Lake Ann has two invasive species: Brittle naiad and Eurasian watermilfoil

In 2026, Lake Ann has special fishing regulations:

- Largemouth Bass: catch-and-release only.
- Northern Pike: All from 24-36’’ must be immediately released. Possession limit three, only one over 36”.

== History ==
Native American tribes occupied the lake long before European settlers.

French-Canadian trappers and fur traders arrived from the Hudson-Bay Company but soon were replaced by the American Fur Company. However, Lake Ann soon became a site for those interested in lumbering. During this time, towns and camps emerged. Lake Ann got its name from the wife of William S. Judd, an early settler. Early settlements were known for their local legends. Present-day historical societies have collections of newspaper clippings and hand-written accounts describing celebrity trappers, lumberjacks, and river drovers.

In the 1970s, Chanhassen developed its first city park on the south shore of the lake, known as Lake Ann Park. The park was built during a population growth spur. The park was part of a redevelopment plan which included adding more companies to the area, which brought in more residents. Today, Lake Ann Park in one of many parks in the city.

Prince owned significant acreage on the west side of the lake until his death in 2016. His estate sold the property in 2019 for development.

== See also ==
- List of lakes in Minnesota
- Chanhassen, Minnesota
- The Temple of Eck on Lake Ann
