= Doug Wardlow =

American attorney and politician

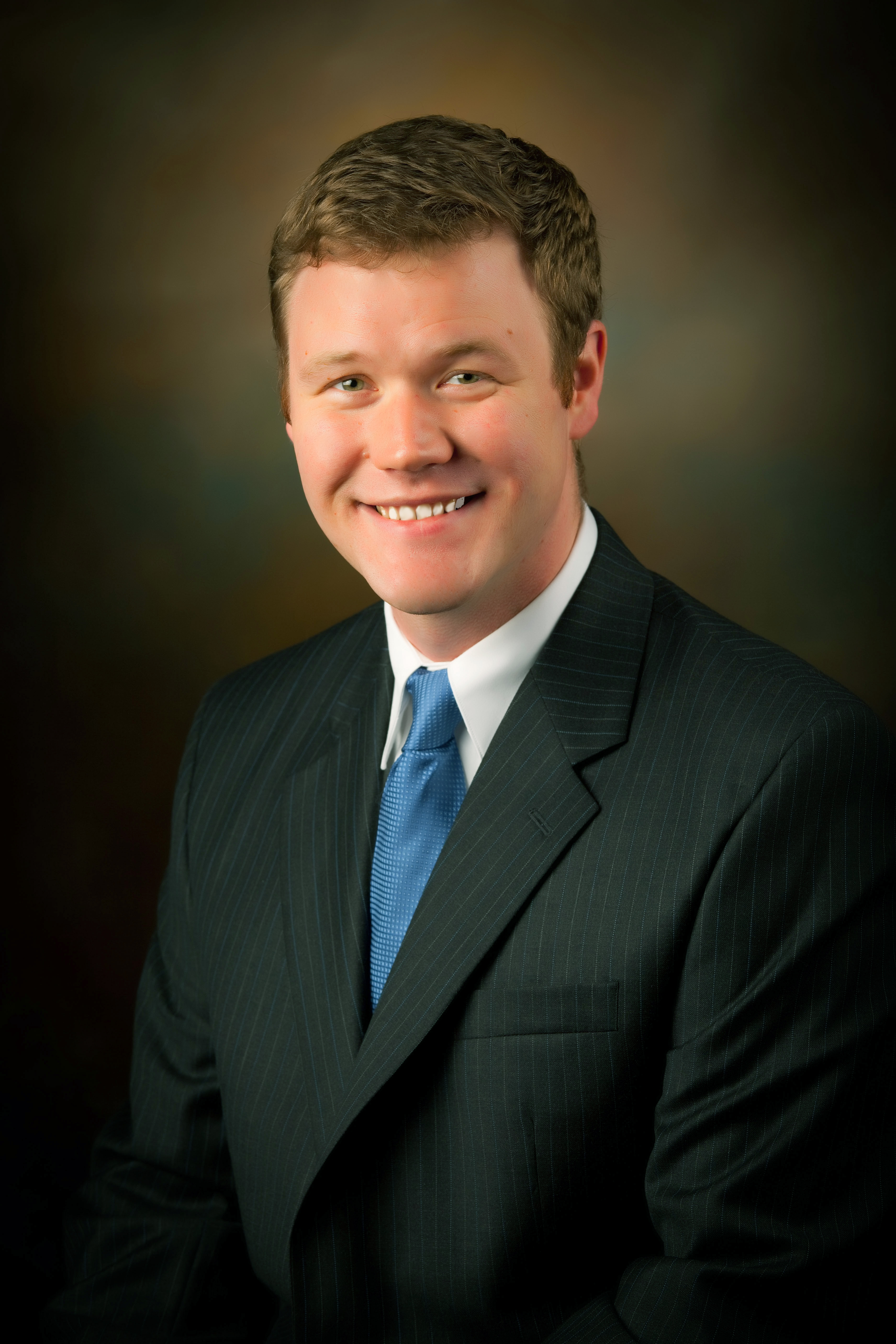

Member of the Minnesota House of Representatives from the 38B district
- In office January 4, 2011 – January 7, 2013
- Preceded by: Mike Obermueller
- Succeeded by: Redistricted

Personal details
- Born: July 3, 1978 (age 48) Eagan, Minnesota, U.S.
- Party: Republican
- Spouse: Jenny
- Children: 3
- Relatives: Lynn Wardlow (father)
- Education: Georgetown University (BA, JD)

Douglas G. Wardlow (born July 3, 1978) is an American attorney and politician who served as a Minnesota state representative from district 38B. Wardlow was the unsuccessful Republican nominee in the 2018 Minnesota Attorney General election.

== Early life and education ==
Wardlow graduated from Eagan High School in Eagan, Minnesota, where he was one of the four valedictorians of his class. He attended Georgetown University in Washington, D.C., studied Mandarin Chinese at Beijing University in Beijing, China, and graduated magna cum laude from Georgetown University with a B.A. in Political Theory with a minor in Mandarin Chinese.

Wardlow earned his J.D., cum laude from Georgetown Law Center. During law school, he also spent a summer clerking at the law firm of Lee and Li in Taipei, Taiwan. He also returned to Beijing University, completing English-language coursework on Chinese law.

== Career ==
After graduating law school, Wardlow served as a judicial law clerk for Associate Justice G. Barry Anderson of the Minnesota Supreme Court. Following his judicial clerkship, Wardlow worked as a litigation attorney for Minneapolis law firm of Parker Rosen, where he specialized in eminent domain, employment law and business law. Wardlow also worked in international trade law.

=== Minnesota House of Representatives ===
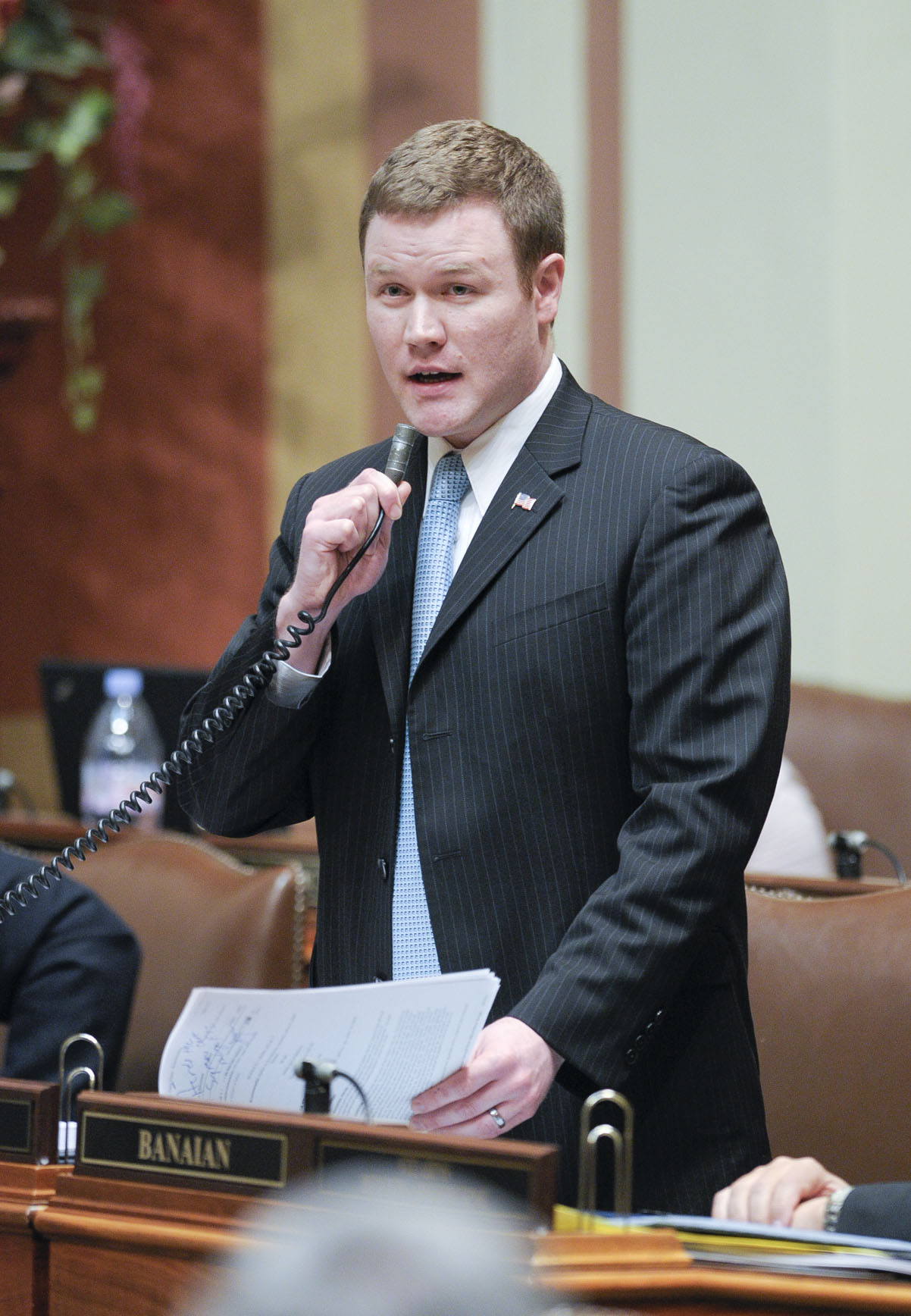
Wardlow on the floor of the Minnesota House of Representatives in 2011.

Wardlow was first elected to the Minnesota House of Representatives in 2010. He served on the Civil Law, Judiciary Policy and Finance, and Taxes committees, and on the Taxes Subcommittee for the Property and Local Tax Division. He narrowly lost his bid for reelection in 2012 to Democrat Laurie Halverson, in the newly created district 51B.

Wardlow wrote a bill that sought to prohibit the creation of health care exchanges that were a component of the Affordable Care Act, but the bill did not become law. He also unsuccessfully pushed for a state constitutional "right to work" amendment that would have banned employers and unions from requiring employees to become dues-paying union members.

=== Alliance Defending Freedom ===
Wardlow worked for Alliance Defending Freedom, but left the group when he launched his bid to become Minnesota Attorney General in 2018. While working for the organization in 2017, Wardlow testified in a school board meeting against allowing transgender students to access facilities in accordance with their gender identities, stating that such policies would "expose children to members of the opposite sex in restrooms or in locker rooms." Wardlow has argued that transgender students using bathrooms reflecting their gender threatens the safety and privacy of other students, and that requiring students to refer to transgender people in accordance with their gender identities violates students' First Amendment right to freedom of speech.

In 2016, Wardlow won a federal lawsuit regarding a Detroit funeral home that fired a transgender employee. The court ruled that the employer did not discriminate against an employee because transgender individuals are a protected class under federal employment laws. The court also ruled that the employer could not be forced to make employment decisions "that go against its sincerely held religious beliefs".

In 2015, Wardlow opposed marriage between two individuals of the same sex. He told The Colorado Independent that the Supreme Courts' decision in favor of same-sex marriage was a "totalitarian impulse," and that the country was not "many steps away from tyranny." According to The Colorado Independent, "[Wardlow's] hope is that the country will experience a “culture shift” and return to what he sees as the United States’ historical roots in Judeo-Christian beliefs and the idea that marriage is an exclusively heterosexual institution. He also acknowledges that without a change in the law, the Constitution now protects marriage equality and there is little Christians can do to change that without regaining broader power.”

=== 2018 Minnesota Attorney General election ===
On August 14, 2018, Wardlow won the Republican primary for Attorney General of Minnesota. He faced Democratic U.S. Rep. Keith Ellison. Grassroots–Legalize Cannabis Party candidate Noah Dilly Johnson had endorsed Ellison, but remained on the general election ballot. Wardlow had previously been endorsed by the Republican Party at its June 2, 2018, state convention. Wardlow lost the election to Ellison by a 49–45% margin.

During his campaign, Wardlow said he would enforce same-sex marriage laws; however, Wardlow previously opposed gay marriage and the Obergefell v. Hodges decision, which he described in 2015 as a "tyrannical impulse". Wardlow has stated that he would not join other Republican attorney generals who sued to overturn the Affordable Care Act. During his campaign for Minnesota Attorney General, Wardlow stated the office is not a "policymaking position" and would refrain from anything "legislative in scope."

Wardlow stated that, if elected, he would "fire 42 Democratic attorneys right off the bat" from the Attorney General's Office, leading to concern that he might politicize the office and make hiring decisions based on political loyalty rather than merit.

Controversy arose around Wardlow during the 2018 campaign. Former Minnesota Supreme Court Justice Paul Anderson remarked, after learning that Wardlow had maintained a politically conservative legal blog during his time as a law clerk, that "I found the conduct of Mr. Wardlow so egregious, so undermining of the ethics and the standards we have on the court I thought he should have been terminated immediately." He initially promised to keep the attorney general's office apolitical, but received backlash after a tape caught his remarks saying, “We’re going to fire 42 Democratic attorneys right off the bat and get Republican attorneys in there."

In addition, a high school classmate of Wardlow's, Ryan Durant, accused Wardlow of anti-gay bullying during high school, also claiming that Wardlow had mocked him after Durant returned to school following a suicide attempt.

Wardlow admitted to committing campaign finance violations in the 2018. He was fined $46,000. Wardlow agreed to pay this amount to the Minnesota Campaign Finance and Public Disclosure Board as a fine. Wardlow was supposed to spend $864,072 during the race. However, over two years, his campaign committee spent $910,490.

=== MyPillow and Mike Lindell ===
In 2020, Wardlow joined MyPillow as Mike Lindell's General Counsel, overseeing legal aspects of the company. Wardlow remained part of Lindell's legal counsel during Lindell's attempt to overturn the 2020 election, when both Lindell's personal and corporate accounts were permanently banned from Twitter. Wardlow also served on Lindell's legal team to advise Lindell about a possible run for Governor of Minnesota. The legal team was tasked with recommending marketing changes needed to make him a viable political candidate.

=== 2022 Minnesota Attorney General election ===
Wardlow announced his running for Minnesota Attorney General in February 2021, and will seek GOP nomination. He is seeking a rematch with Attorney General Keith Ellison in the statewide election.

Wardlow came under criticism over statements made following the killing of Daunte Wright by police officer Kimberly Potter in Brooklyn Center, Minnesota. Wardlow was a guest of conservative talk show host Joe Pags, when he stated that Daunte Wright "might still be alive if we didn't have so much pressure against the police." In the interview, Wardlow and Pags both attributed some recent police killings to victims' failure to comply with officers, something Wardlow said was the result of "a false narrative that's being spread and perpetuated by folks like Keith Ellison and Rashida Tlaib and Ilhan Omar." The narrative, Wardlow said, makes people believe "police hate people of a certain race" and that there's "systemic racism" in police departments, both of which he said are "completely untrue." He also stated that because of public pressure, "the morale of police is so low, it makes it more likely for them to make mistakes and for accidents like this to happen." The Minnesota DFL Party stated that his comments were "beyond insulting", calling him "not fit to serve Minnesotans."

== Personal life ==
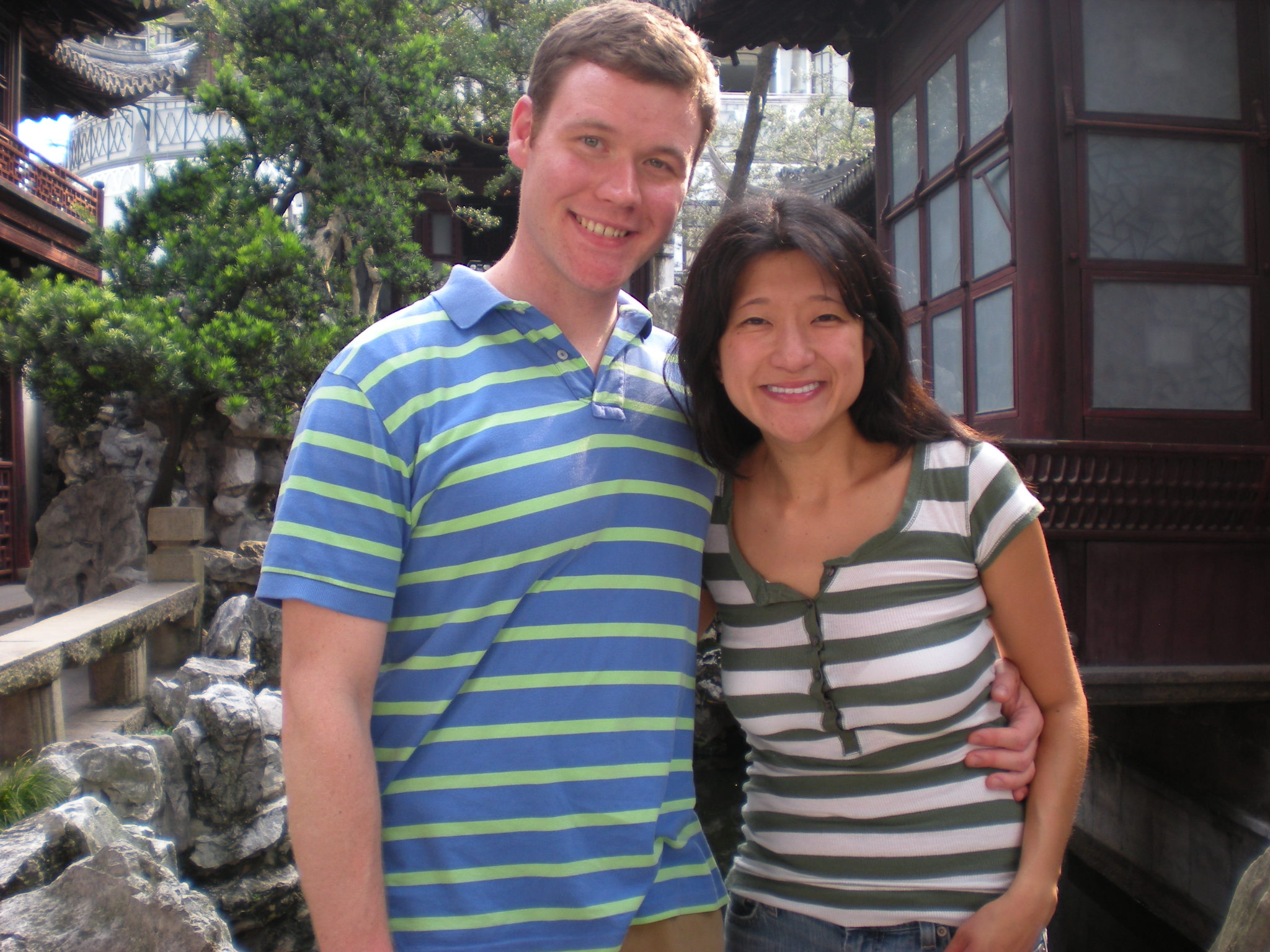
Wardlow with wife Jenny in 2008.

Wardlow and his family have long been active in government and politics. While attending Georgetown University, he volunteered at the offices of U.S. Representatives John Kline and Gil Gutknecht, and also worked as a volunteer legal research clerk for U.S. Senator Chuck Grassley. His father, Lynn Wardlow, also served as a Minnesota State Representative for the same district from 2003 to 2009. Wardlow resides in Prior Lake, Minnesota with his wife Jenny and three children.

Party political offices
Preceded by Scott Newman	Republican nominee for Attorney General of Minnesota; 2018	Succeeded by Jim Schultz
