= Debbie Turner =

American actress

Debra Turner
- Born: September 5, 1956 (age 70); Arcadia, California
- Occupation: Floral designer
- Years active: 1965–present
- Spouse: Richard Larson (1980-present)
- Children: 4

Debra Turner (born September 5, 1956) is an American actress who played the role of Marta von Trapp in the film The Sound of Music.

== Life and career ==
Turner was born and raised in Arcadia, California. In 1964, she won the role of Marta Von Trapp in The Sound of Music. Shortly after the film debuted, Turner left the film industry and returned to school to finish her education.

Turner appeared as a party guest in the 1979 film North Dallas Forty. By 1985, she had relocated to Chanhassen, Minnesota, where she raised four daughters with her husband Rick. Though not active in the film industry, Turner regularly visits with her The Sound of Music castmates and has made a number of television appearances, including The Oprah Winfrey Show where she discussed the film's 45th anniversary. Turner was also selected as one of three float judges for the 2011 Tournament of Roses Parade.

In 2026, her granddaughter Fifer played the role of Marta in a production of the musical in Thief River Falls, Minnesota.
