= AmericInn =

American hotel franchise

AmericInn International Inc.
- Type: Subsidiary
- Industry: Hospitality, hotels
- Founded: 1979
- Founder: Jim Graves
- Headquarters: Parsippany, New Jersey, U.S.
- Number of locations: 218 (December 31, 2023)
- Area served: 20 states
- Parent: Wyndham Hotels & Resorts (previously owned by Northcott Hospitality)
- Website: www.americinn.com

AmericInn by Wyndham is an American hotel franchise founded in 1979 in the suburban Twin Cities. The chain is a mid-priced, limited-service division of Wyndham Hotels & Resorts.

== History ==
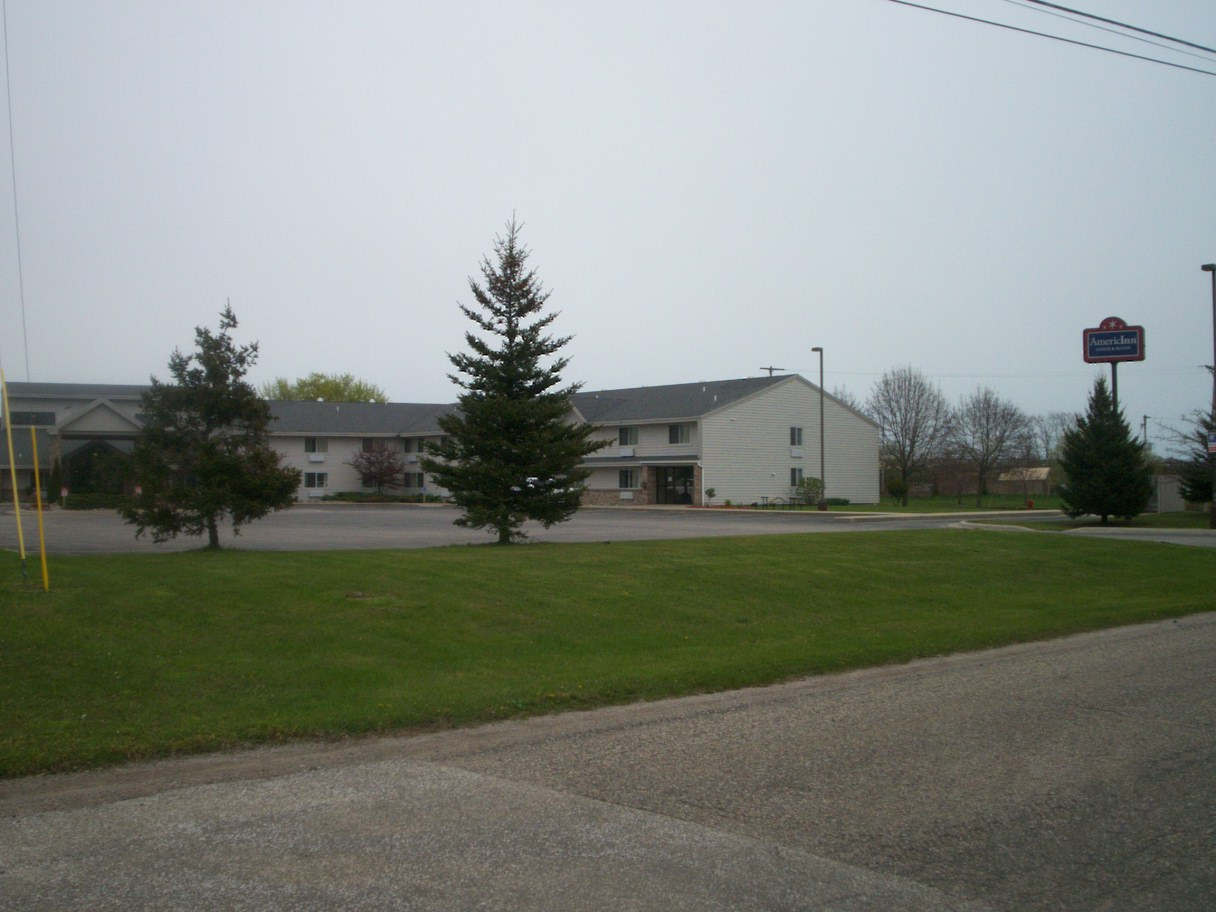
An AmericInn in Oscoda, Michigan.

The AmericInn Franchise was founded by Jim Graves, and the first location opened in 1979 in Rogers, Minnesota. By 1990, there were more than 20 AmericInn properties located in Minnesota and Wisconsin. In 1994, AmericInn began franchising with the help of Wyman Nelson, an entrepreneur known for expanding the Perkins Restaurant and Bakery chain in the 1960s and 1970s.

Expansion outside the Midwestern United States began in 2000. AmericInn has 240 motels, with more than 80 percent of its locations in the Upper Midwest. Wyndham Hotels & Resorts bought the brand in July 2017.

== Concept ==
Rooms are built with masonry block, sound deadening foam and heavy drywall between rooms, as well as concrete slabs, to minimize noise within rooms.

== Properties ==
As of December 31, 2023, AmericInn by Wyndham consists of 218 locations with 12,866 rooms throughout the United States, with the majority located in the Midwestern United States.
