= Mike Obermueller =

American lawyer and politician

Member of the Minnesota House of Representatives from the 38B district
- In office January 6, 2009 – January 3, 2011
- Preceded by: Lynn Wardlow
- Succeeded by: Doug Wardlow

Personal details
- Born: Michael Edward Obermueller; April 21, 1973 (age 53) Marshfield, Wisconsin, U.S.
- Party: Democratic
- Spouse: Sara
- Children: 2
- Education: Loras College (BA); University of Iowa (JD)
- Profession: Attorney, legislator

Michael Edward Obermueller (born April 21, 1973) is a Minnesota lawyer and politician, a former member of the Minnesota House of Representatives. He represented District 38B in the southeastern Twin Cities metropolitan area from 2009 to 2011. In 2012 and 2014 Obermueller was the Democratic-Farmer-Labor Party candidate for United States Congress in the second congressional district, challenging incumbent John Kline.

== Early life, education and career ==
Raised on a dairy farm near Glenwood City, Wisconsin, Obermueller attended Loras College in Dubuque, Iowa, graduating magna cum laude in 1996 with a B.A. in Media and Public Address, with a Political Science emphasis. He went on to the University of Iowa College of Law in Iowa City, earning his J.D. With High Distinction in 2001. Between college and law school, he worked as Director of Campus Dining Services for Aramark Corporation at Mount Marty College in Yankton, South Dakota.

Obermueller is an attorney for the Minneapolis law firm of Winthrop & Weinstine, P.A., where he focuses on commercial litigation and construction law.

== Political career ==
Obermueller was first elected in 2008, succeeding three-term incumbent Rep. Lynn Wardlow. He was unseated by Republican Doug Wardlow in the 2010 general election. He was a member of the House K-12 Education Policy and Oversight Committee, and also served on the Finance subcommittees for the Bioscience and Workforce Development Policy and Oversight Division, of which he was vice chair, the Energy Finance and Policy Division, and the Higher Education and Workforce Development Finance and Policy Division.

=== 2012 U.S. House campaign ===
In 2012 Obermueller won the endorsement of the Democratic-Farmer-Labor Party for United States Congress in Minnesota's 2nd congressional district, challenging five-term incumbent John Kline. He was unsuccessful, garnering 46% of the vote to Kline's 54%.

=== 2014 U.S. House campaign ===
In 2014 Obermueller again was the Democratic-Farmer-Labor Party candidate for United States Congress in Minnesota's 2nd congressional district. This time incumbent John Kline defeated Obermuller by a 17-point margin.

== Personal life ==
Participating in his local community, Obermueller is a member of the Dakota County Regional Chamber of Commerce and the Knights of Columbus, a board member for the Eagan Art Festival, and a volunteer coach for the Eagan Athletic Association.
