= Electoral history of Tim Walz =

Elections featuring Governor of Minnesota

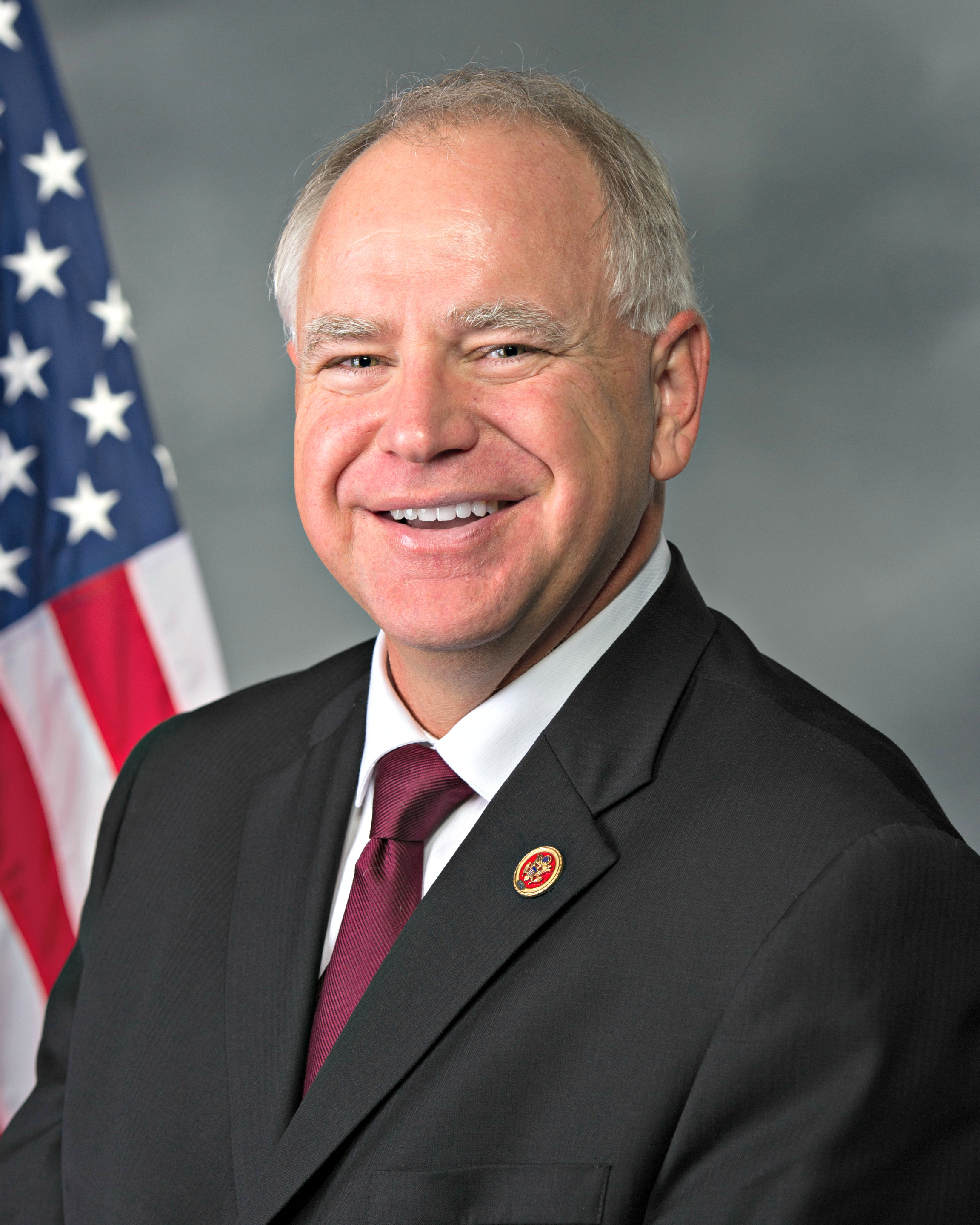
Tim Walz in 2013

Tim Walz is the 41st and current governor of Minnesota. He previously represented Minnesota's 1st congressional district in the United States House of Representatives from 2007 to 2019. He also ran for the U.S. Vice Presidency in 2024.

== U.S. House elections ==
=== 2006 ===
2006 United States House of Representatives elections in Minnesota, District 1
Primary election
Party	Candidate	Votes	%
Democratic (DFL)	Tim Walz	26,475	100.0
Total votes		26,475	100.0
General election
Democratic (DFL)	Tim Walz	141,556	52.7
Republican	Gil Gutknecht (incumbent)	126,486	47.1
Write-in		379	0.1
Total votes		268,421	100.0
Democratic (DFL) gain from Republican			

=== 2008 ===
2008 United States House of Representatives elections in Minnesota, District 1
Primary election
Party	Candidate	Votes	%
Democratic (DFL)	Tim Walz (incumbent)	20,998	100.0
Total votes		20,998	100.0
General election
Democratic (DFL)	Tim Walz (incumbent)	207,753	62.5
Republican	Brian J. Davis	109,453	32.9
Independence	Gregory Mikkelson	14,904	4.5
Write-in		290	0.1
Total votes		332,110	100.0
Democratic (DFL) hold			

=== 2010 ===
2010 United States House of Representatives elections in Minnesota, District 1
Party	Candidate	Votes	%
Democratic (DFL)	Tim Walz (incumbent)	122,365	49.3
Republican	Randy Demmer	109,242	44.0
Independence	Steven Wilson	13,242	5.3
Independent	Lars Johnson	3,054	1.2
Write-in		102	0.0
Total votes		248,035	100.0
Democratic (DFL) hold			

=== 2012 ===
2012 United States House of Representatives elections in Minnesota, District 1
Primary election
Party	Candidate	Votes	%
Democratic (DFL)	Tim Walz (incumbent)	15,697	100.0
Total votes		15,697	100.0
General election
Democratic (DFL)	Tim Walz (incumbent)	193,211	57.5
Republican	Allen Quist	142,164	42.3
Write-in		505	0.2
Total votes		335,880	100.0
Democratic (DFL) hold			

=== 2014 ===
2014 United States House of Representatives elections in Minnesota, District 1
Party	Candidate	Votes	%
Democratic (DFL)	Tim Walz (incumbent)	19,983	100.0
Total votes		19,983	100.0
General election
Democratic (DFL)	Tim Walz (incumbent)	122,851	54.2
Republican	Jim Hagedorn	103,536	45.7
Write-in		308	0.1
Total votes		226,695	100.0
Democratic (DFL) hold			

=== 2016 ===
2016 United States House of Representatives elections in Minnesota, District 1
Party	Candidate	Votes	%
Democratic (DFL)	Tim Walz (incumbent)	13,538	100.0
Total votes		13,538	100.0
General election
Democratic (DFL)	Tim Walz (incumbent)	169,074	50.4
Republican	Jim Hagedorn	166,526	49.6
Write-in		277	0.1
Total votes		335,877	100.0
Democratic (DFL) hold			

== Gubernatorial elections ==
=== 2018 ===
2018 Minnesota Democratic–Farmer–Labor Party gubernatorial primary
Party	Candidate	Votes	%
Democratic (DFL)	Tim Walz	242,832	41.60%
Democratic (DFL)	Erin Murphy	186,969	32.03%
Democratic (DFL)	Lori Swanson	143,517	24.59%
Democratic (DFL)	Tim Holden	6,398	1.10%
Democratic (DFL)	Olé Savior	4,019	0.69%
Total votes		583,735	100%

2018 Minnesota gubernatorial election
Party	Candidate	Votes	%	±%
Democratic (DFL)	Tim Walz/Peggy Flanagan	1,393,096	53.84%	+3.77%
Republican	Jeff Johnson/Donna Bergstrom	1,097,705	42.43%	−2.08%
Grassroots	Chris Wright/Judith Schwartzbacker	68,667	2.65%	+1.07%
Libertarian	Josh Welter/Mary O'Connor	26,735	1.03%	+0.11%
Write-in		1,084	0.04%	0.00%
Total votes		2,587,287	100.0%	N/A
Democratic (DFL) hold				

=== 2022 ===
2022 Minnesota gubernatorial election
Party	Candidate	Votes	%	±%
Democratic (DFL)	Tim Walz/Peggy Flanagan (incumbent)	1,312,311	52.27%	−1.57%
Republican	Scott Jensen/Matt Birk	1,119,911	44.61%	+2.18%
Legal Marijuana Now	James McCaskel/David Sandbeck	29,435	1.17%	N/A
Grassroots—LC	Steve Patterson/Matt Huff	22,604	0.90%	−1.75%
Independence	Hugh McTavish/Mike Winter	18,156	0.72%	N/A
Socialist Workers	Gabrielle Prosser/Kevin Dwire	7,240	0.29%	N/A
Write-in		1,026	0.04%	0.00%
Total votes		2,510,683	100.0%	
Democratic (DFL) hold				

== Vice presidential elections ==
=== 2024 ===
==== Nomination ====
2024 Democratic National Convention, vice presidential tally
Candidate	Votes	%
Tim Walz	_ (Note: Chosen by acclamation.)	100.00
Total votes		100.00

==== General election ====
Electoral college map of the 2024 election

Electoral results
Presidential candidate	Party	Home state	Popular vote		Electoral vote	Running mate		
Presidential candidate	Party	Home state	Count	Percentage	Electoral vote	Vice-presidential candidate	Home state	Electoral vote
Donald Trump	Republican	Florida	77,236,275	49.9%	312	JD Vance	Ohio	312
Kamala Harris	Democratic	California	74,938,474	48.4%	226	Tim Walz	Minnesota	226
Jill Stein	Green	Massachusetts	782,068	0.5%	0	Butch Ware	California	0
Robert F. Kennedy Jr.	Independent	New York	755,018	0.5%	0	Nicole Shanahan	California	0
Other					—	Other		—
Total				100%	538			538
Needed to win					270			270
