= 2014 United States House of Representatives elections in Minnesota =

- November 4, 2014

All 8 Minnesota seats to the United States House of Representatives
	Majority party	Minority party
Party	Democratic (DFL)	Republican
Last election	5	3
Seats won	5	3
Seat change	Steady	Steady
Popular vote	985,760	913,539
Percentage	50.20%	46.53%
Swing	▼5.28%	▲3.51%

Democratic
40–50%
50–60%
60–70%
70–80%
Republican
40–50%
50–60%
60–70%

The 2014 United States House of Representatives elections in Minnesota took place in the U.S. state of Minnesota on November 4, 2014, to elect Minnesota's eight representatives in the United States House of Representatives for two-year terms, one from each of Minnesota's eight congressional districts. Primary elections were held on August 12, 2014.

In these elections, Minnesotans elected their oldest U.S. House delegation across the 80 cycles since statehood, at an average age of 58.8 years: Rick Nolan (age 70), Collin Peterson (70), John Kline (67), Betty McCollum (60), Keith Ellison (51), Tom Emmer (53), Tim Walz (50) and Erik Paulsen (49).

== Overview ==
=== Statewide ===
Party	Candidates	Votes		Seats		
Party	Candidates	No.	%	No.	+/–	%
Democratic-Farmer-Labor	8	985,760	50.20	5	Steady	62.50
Republican	8	913,539	46.53	3	Steady	37.50
Independence	4	50,836	2.59	0	Steady	0.0
Green	1	11,450	0.58	0	Steady	0.0
Write-in	8	1,954	0.10	0	Steady	0.0
Total	29	1,963,539	100.0	8	Steady	100.0

Popular vote
Democratic	50.20%
Republican	46.53%
Independence	2.59%
Other	0.68%

House seats
Democratic	62.50%
Republican	37.50%

=== By district ===
Results of the 2014 United States House of Representatives elections in Minnesota by district:

District	Democratic (DFL)		Republican		Others		Total		Result
District	Votes	%	Votes	%	Votes	%	Votes	%	Result
District 1	122,851	54.19%	103,536	45.67%	308	0.14%	226,695	100.0%	Democratic hold
District 2	95,565	38.87%	137,778	56.04%	12,505	5.09%	245,848	100.0%	Republican hold
District 3	101,846	37.78%	167,515	62.14%	224	0.08%	269,585	100.0%	Republican hold
District 4	147,857	61.19%	79,492	32.90%	14,288	5.91%	241,637	100.0%	Democratic hold
District 5	167,079	70.79%	56,577	23.97%	12,354	5.24%	236,010	100.0%	Democratic hold
District 6	90,926	38.39%	133,328	56.29%	12,592	5.32%	236,846	100.0%	Republican hold
District 7	130,546	54.21%	109,955	45.66%	334	0.14%	240,835	100.0%	Democratic hold
District 8	129,090	48.52%	125,358	47.11%	11,635	4.37%	266,083	100.0%	Democratic hold
Total	985,760	50.20%	913,539	46.53%	64,240	3.27%	1,963,539	100.0%	

== District 1 ==
2014 Minnesota's 1st congressional district election
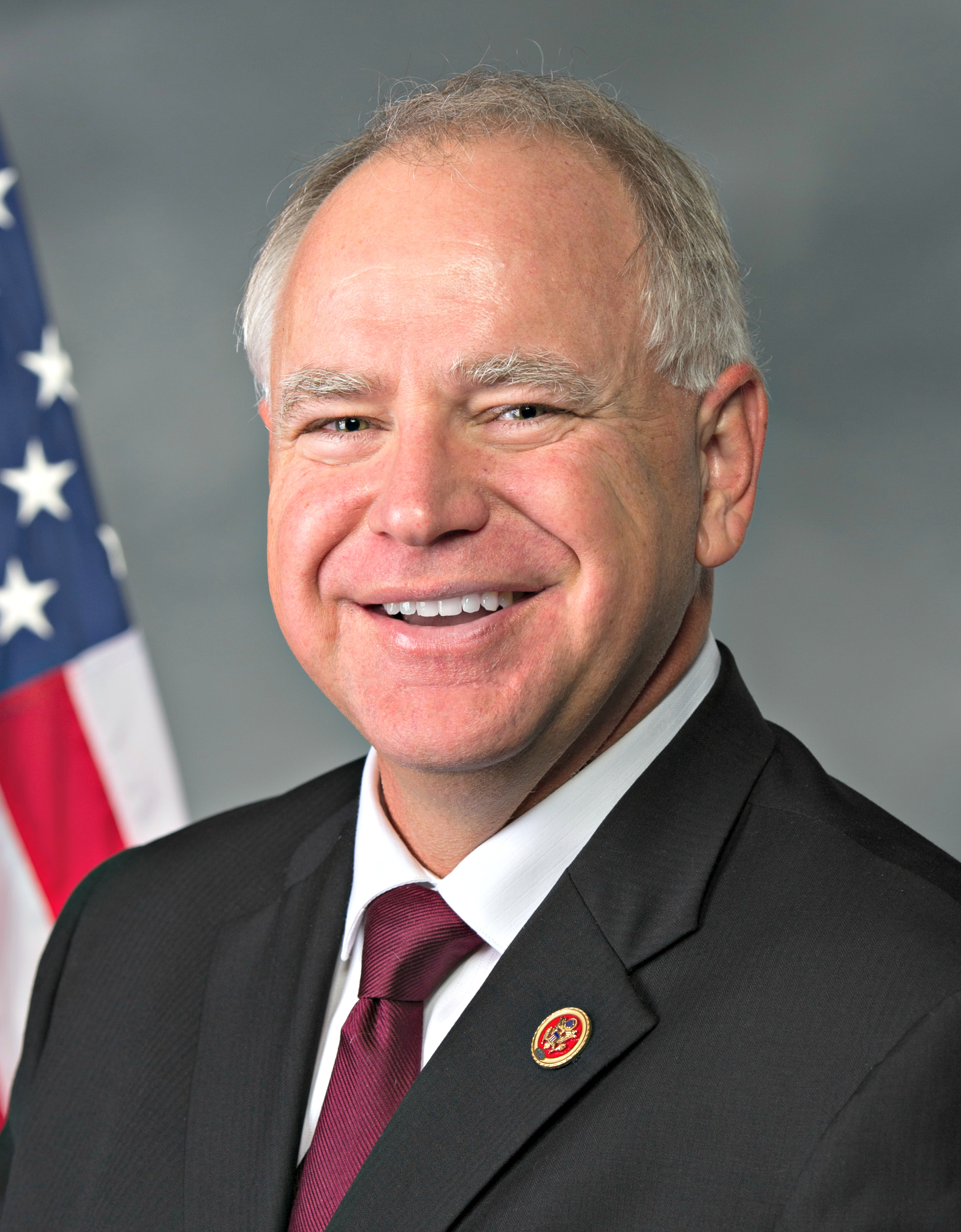

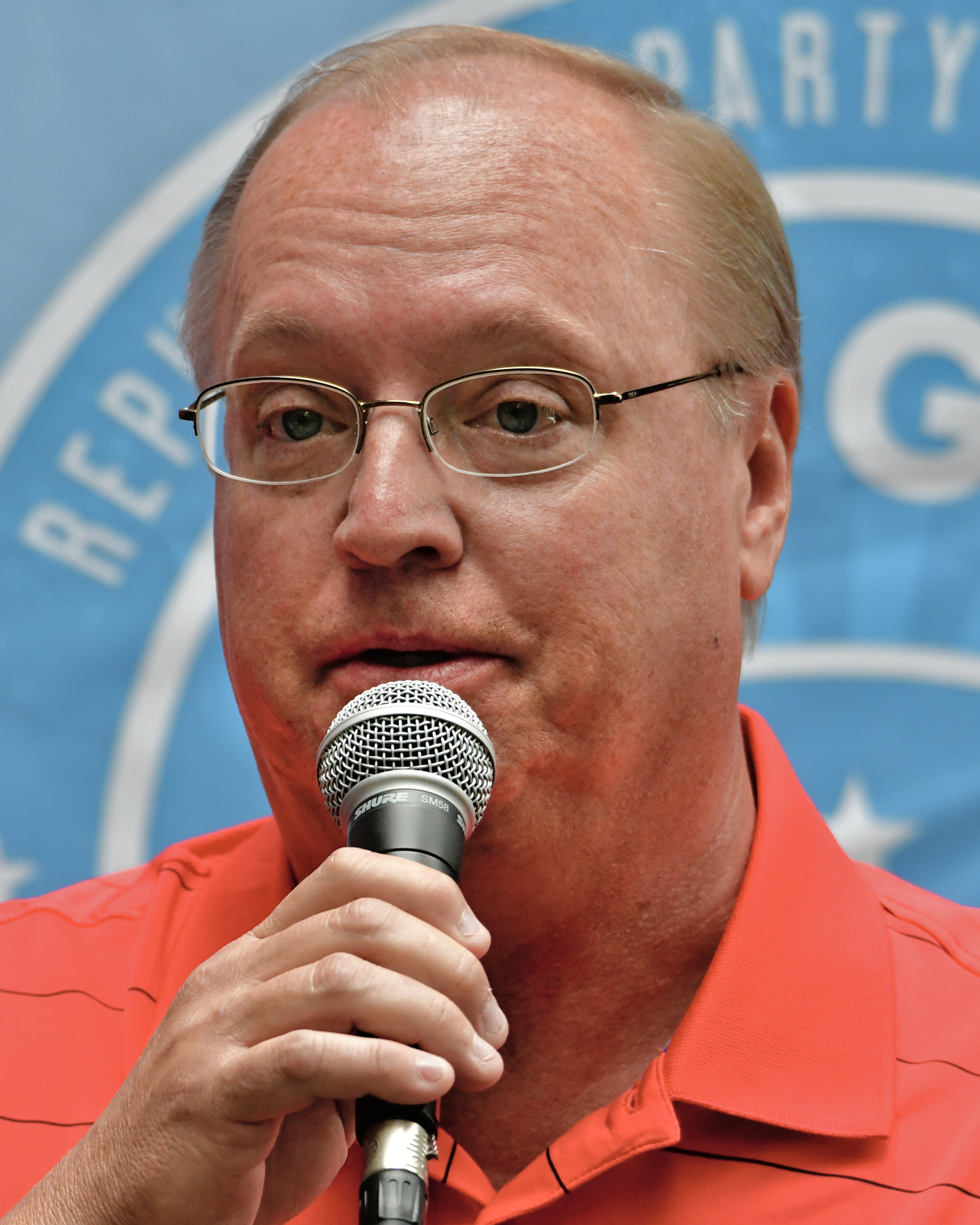
Nominee	Tim Walz	Jim Hagedorn
Party	Democratic (DFL)	Republican
Popular vote	122,851	103,536
Percentage	54.2%	45.7%
- Walz: 50–60% 60–70% 70–80% 80–90% Hagedorn: 50–60% 60–70% 70–80% 80–90% >90% Tie: 40–50% 50% No votes
U.S. Representative before election
Tim Walz
Democratic (DFL)
Elected U.S. Representative
Tim Walz
Democratic (DFL)

Incumbent Democrat Tim Walz, who had represented the district since 2007, ran for re-election. He was re-elected with 57.5% of the vote in 2012, and the district had a PVI of R+1.

=== Democratic–Farmer–Labor primary ===
==== Candidates ====
===== Nominee =====
- Tim Walz, incumbent U.S. Representative

==== Results ====
Democratic–Farmer–Labor primary results
Party	Candidate	Votes	%
Democratic (DFL)	Tim Walz (incumbent)	19,983	100.0
Total votes		19,983	100.0

=== Republican primary ===
Republican State Representative Mike Benson, Jim Hagedorn of Blue Earth and U.S. Army veteran Aaron Miller of Byron all sought the nomination to challenge Walz. Hagedorn and Miller had pledged to abide by the Republican endorsement while Benson did not. On April 5, 2014, Aaron Miller won the GOP endorsement. Benson and Hagedorn then withdrew, though Hagedorn re-entered the race on May 18, expressing concerns that Miller was not dedicating enough time to the race.

==== Candidates ====
===== Nominee =====
- Jim Hagedorn, former congressional affairs officer for the Bureau of Engraving and Printing and candidate for this seat in 2010

===== Eliminated in primary =====
- Aaron Miller, U.S. Army veteran

===== Withdrawn =====
- Mike Benson, state representative

===== Declined =====
- Jeremy Miller, state senator

==== Results ====
Republican primary results
Party	Candidate	Votes	%
Republican	Jim Hagedorn	12,748	54.0
Republican	Aaron Miller	10,870	46.0
Total votes		23,618	100.0

=== General election ===
==== Polling ====
Poll source	Date(s) administered	Sample size	Margin of error	Tim Walz (DFL)	Jim Hagedorn (R)	Undecided
New York Times/CBS News Battleground Tracker	October 16–23, 2014	329	± 8.0%	47%	36%	17%
Harper Polling (R-Hagedorn)	September 9–10, 2014	437	± 4.7%	38%	32%	31%

Hypothetical polling

Tim Walz vs. generic opponent

Poll source	Date(s) administered	Sample size	Margin of error	Tim Walz (DFL)	Generic Opponent	Undecided
Harper Polling (R-Hagedorn)	September 9–10, 2014	437	± 4.7%	34%	39%	27%

Generic Democrat vs. generic Republican

Poll source	Date(s) administered	Sample size	Margin of error	Generic Democrat	Generic Republican	Undecided
Harper Polling (R-Hagedorn)	September 9–10, 2014	437	± 4.7%	34%	40%	26%

==== Predictions ====
Source	Ranking	As of
The Cook Political Report	Likely D	November 3, 2014
Rothenberg	Safe D	October 24, 2014
Sabato's Crystal Ball	Safe D	October 30, 2014
RCP	Safe D	November 2, 2014
Daily Kos Elections	Safe D	November 4, 2014

==== Results ====
Minnesota's 1st congressional district, 2014
Party	Candidate	Votes	%
Democratic (DFL)	Tim Walz (incumbent)	122,851	54.2
Republican	Jim Hagedorn	103,536	45.7
Write-in		308	0.1
Total votes		226,695	100.0
Democratic (DFL) hold			

==== Finances ====
===== Campaigns =====
Candidate (party)	Raised	Spent	Cash on hand
Tim Walz (DFL)	$1,575,565	$1,559,503	$79,299
Jim Hagedorn (R)	$240,931	$238,634	$2,297

===== Outside Spending =====
Candidate (party)	Supported	Opposed
Tim Walz (DFL)	$3,734	$0
Jim Hagedorn (R)	$896	$0

== District 2 ==
2014 Minnesota's 2nd congressional district election
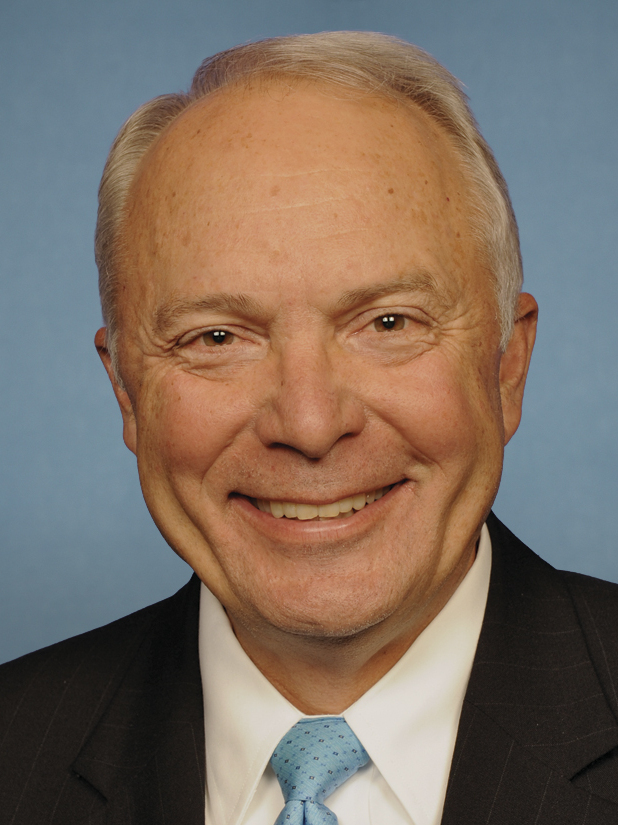

Nominee	John Kline	Mike Obermueller	Paula Overby
Party	Republican	Democratic (DFL)	Independence
Popular vote	137,778	95,565	12,319
Percentage	56.0%	38.9%	5.0%
- Precinct results Kline: 40–50% 50–60% 60–70% 70–80% 80–90% Obermueller: 40–50% 50–60% 60–70% 70–80% 80–90% >90% Tie: 40–50%
U.S. Representative before election
John Kline
Republican
Elected U.S. Representative
John Kline
Republican

Incumbent Republican John Kline, who had represented the district since 2003, ran for re-election. He was re-elected with 54% of the vote in 2012, and the district had a PVI of R+2.

Kline was rumoured to be interested in running for Governor of Minnesota or the United States Senate. Instead, he announced he would seek re-election.

=== Republican primary ===
David Gerson challenged Kline for the Republican nomination but conceded after Kline won the Republican endorsement.

==== Candidates ====
===== Nominee =====
- John Kline, incumbent U.S. Representative

===== Withdrawn =====
- David Gerson, engineer and candidate for this seat in 2012

===== Declined =====
- Kurt Bills, former state representative and nominee for the U.S. Senate in 2012
- Chris Gerlach, state senator and Dakota County Commissioner
- Pat Garofalo, state representative
- Kelby Woodard, state representative

==== Results ====
Republican primary results
Party	Candidate	Votes	%
Republican	John Kline (incumbent)	18,236	100.0
Total votes		18,236	100.0

=== Democratic–Farmer–Labor primary ===
Mike Obermueller, who lost to Kline in 2012, had decided to run again. He won the DFL endorsement on April 26, 2014.

Sona Mehring, the founder of CaringBridge, declared her candidacy, but dropped out of the race three weeks later. Thomas Craft, who volunteered for Obermueller in the 2012 race, declared his candidacy in July 2013 and positioned himself as a fiscally conservative, socially liberal alternative to Kline and Obermueller. Craft ceased his campaign after Obermueller won the DFL endorsement. Eagan quality assurance analyst Paula Overby initially sought the DFL endorsement but withdrew after Obermueller won it and instead became the Independence Party nominee.

==== Candidates ====
===== Nominee =====
- Mike Obermueller, former state representative and nominee for this seat in 2012

===== Eliminated in primary =====
- Michael Roberts, Law student, Hamline University and business development executive

===== Withdrawn =====
- Thomas Craft, IT consultant
- Sona Mehring, founder of CaringBridge
- Paula Overby, quality assurance analyst (ran for the Independence nomination)

==== Results ====
Democratic–Farmer–Labor primary results
Party	Candidate	Votes	%
Democratic (DFL)	Mike Obermueller	12,361	82.5
Democratic (DFL)	Michael J. Roberts	2,622	17.5
Total votes		14,983	100.0

=== Independence primary ===
==== Candidates ====
===== Nominee =====
- Paula Overby, quality assurance analyst

==== Results ====
Independence primary results
Party	Candidate	Votes	%
Independence	Paula Overby	461	100.0
Total votes		461	100.0

=== General election ===
The 2014 election in the 2nd district was expected to be one of the tightest congressional races in the country. Kline's district was one of 17 Republican congressional districts to vote for President Barack Obama in 2012, and polling data suggested a Democratic challenger could unseat Kline.

==== Polling ====
Poll source	Date(s) administered	Sample size	Margin of error	John Kline (R)	Mike Obermueller (DFL)	Paula Overby (I)	Undecided
New York Times/CBS News Battleground Tracker	October 16–23, 2014	450	± 7.0%	48%	34%	0%	18%
Remington Research Group	September 18–21, 2014	568	± 4.1%	54%	32%	4%	10%
Public Policy Polling	October 21–22, 2013	825	± 3.4%	38%	42%	—	20%

==== Predictions ====
Source	Ranking	As of
The Cook Political Report	Safe R	November 3, 2014
Rothenberg	Safe R	October 24, 2014
Sabato's Crystal Ball	Safe R	October 30, 2014
RCP	Safe R	November 2, 2014
Daily Kos Elections	Safe R	November 4, 2014

==== Results ====
Minnesota's 2nd congressional district, 2014
Party	Candidate	Votes	%
Republican	John Kline (incumbent)	137,778	56.0
Democratic (DFL)	Mike Obermueller	95,565	38.9
Independence	Paula Overby	12,319	5.0
Write-in		186	0.1
Total votes		245,848	100.0
Republican hold			

==== Finances ====
===== Campaigns =====
Candidate (party)	Raised	Spent	Cash on hand
John Kline (R)	$2,776,558	$3,226,367	$115,781
Mike Obermueller (DFL)	$933,588	$933,332	$12,263
Paula Overby (I)	$8,755	$8,472	$0

===== Outside Spending =====
Candidate (party)	Supported	Opposed
John Kline (R)	$6,438	$51,420
Mike Obermueller (DFL)	$0	$0
Paula Overby (I)	$0	$0

== District 3 ==
2014 Minnesota's 3rd congressional district election
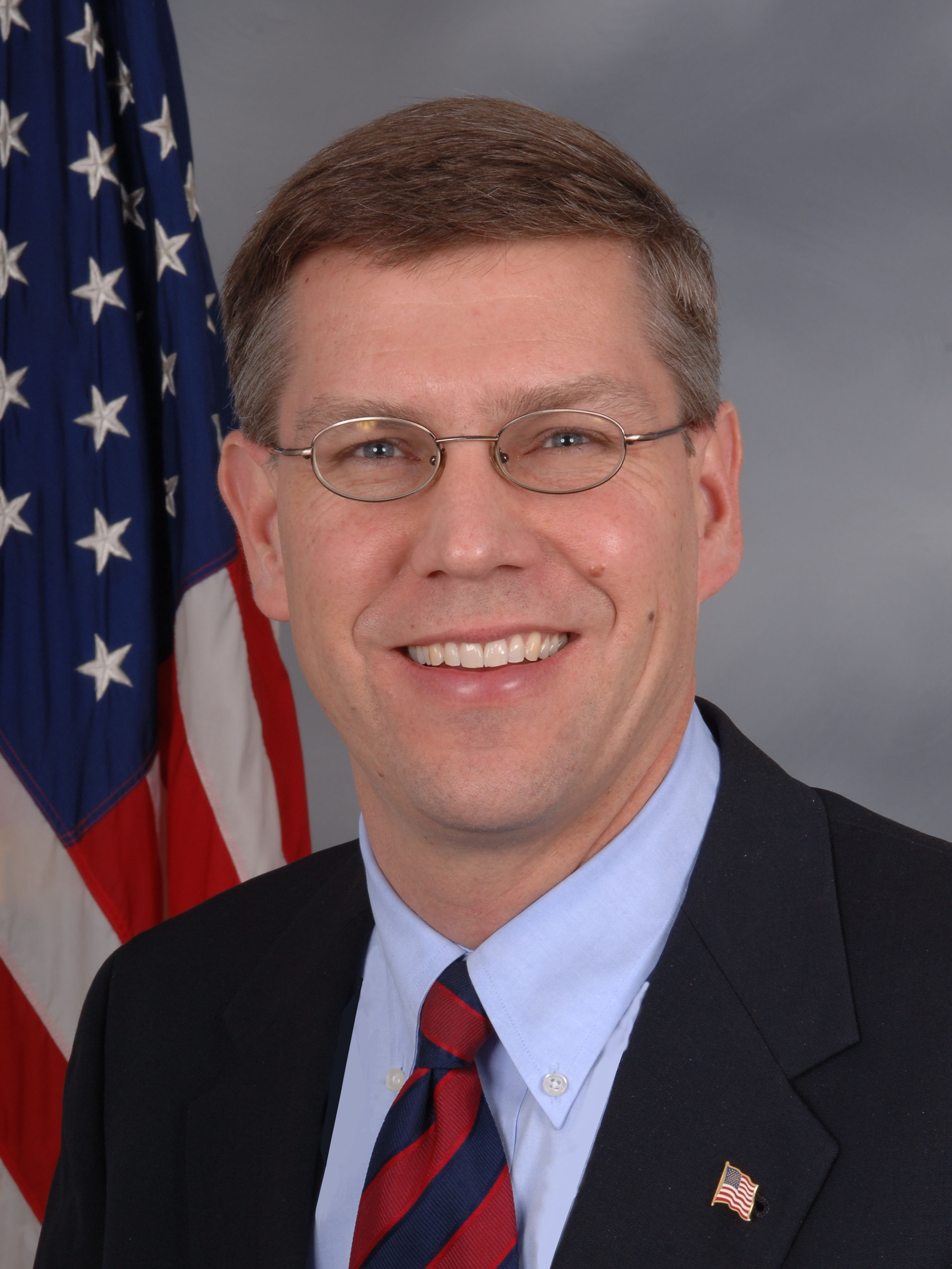

Nominee	Erik Paulsen	Sharon Sund
Party	Republican	Democratic (DFL)
Popular vote	167,515	101,846
Percentage	62.1%	37.8%
- Precinct results Paulsen: 50–60% 60–70% 70–80% 80–90% Sund: 50–60% 60–70% No votes
U.S. Representative before election
Erik Paulsen
Republican
Elected U.S. Representative
Erik Paulsen
Republican

Incumbent Republican Erik Paulsen, who had represented the district since, ran for re-election. He was re-elected with 58% of the vote in 2012, and the district had a PVI of R+2.

Paulsen considered running for governor or the United States Senate in 2014 before announcing he would seek re-election to the U.S. House instead.

=== Republican primary ===
==== Candidates ====
===== Nominee =====
- Erik Paulsen, incumbent U.S. Representative

=== Democratic–Farmer–Labor primary ===
==== Candidates ====
===== Nominee =====
- Sharon Sund, businesswoman

===== Declined =====
- James Lawrence, businessman
- Don Shelby, former WCCO-TV anchor

=== General election ===
==== Polling ====
Poll source	Date(s) administered	Sample size	Margin of error	Erik Paulsen (R)	Sharon Sund (DFL)	Undecided
New York Times/CBS News Battleground Tracker	October 16–23, 2014	271	± 8.0%	51%	40%	8%

==== Predictions ====
Source	Ranking	As of
The Cook Political Report	Safe R	November 3, 2014
Rothenberg	Safe R	October 24, 2014
Sabato's Crystal Ball	Safe R	October 30, 2014
RCP	Safe R	November 2, 2014
Daily Kos Elections	Safe R	November 4, 2014

==== Results ====
Minnesota's 3rd congressional district, 2014
Party	Candidate	Votes	%
Republican	Erik Paulsen (incumbent)	167,515	62.1
Democratic (DFL)	Sharon Sund	101,846	37.8
Write-in		224	0.1
Total votes		269,585	100.0
Republican hold			

==== Finances ====
===== Campaigns =====
Candidate (party)	Raised	Spent	Cash on hand
Erik Paulsen (R)	$3,196,226	$2,695,111	$1,194,961
Sharon Sund (DFL)	$156,135	$127,647	$28,981

===== Outside Spending =====
Candidate (party)	Supported	Opposed
Erik Paulsen (R)	$7,259	$0
Sharon Sund (DFL)	$0	$0

== District 4 ==
2014 Minnesota's 4th congressional district election
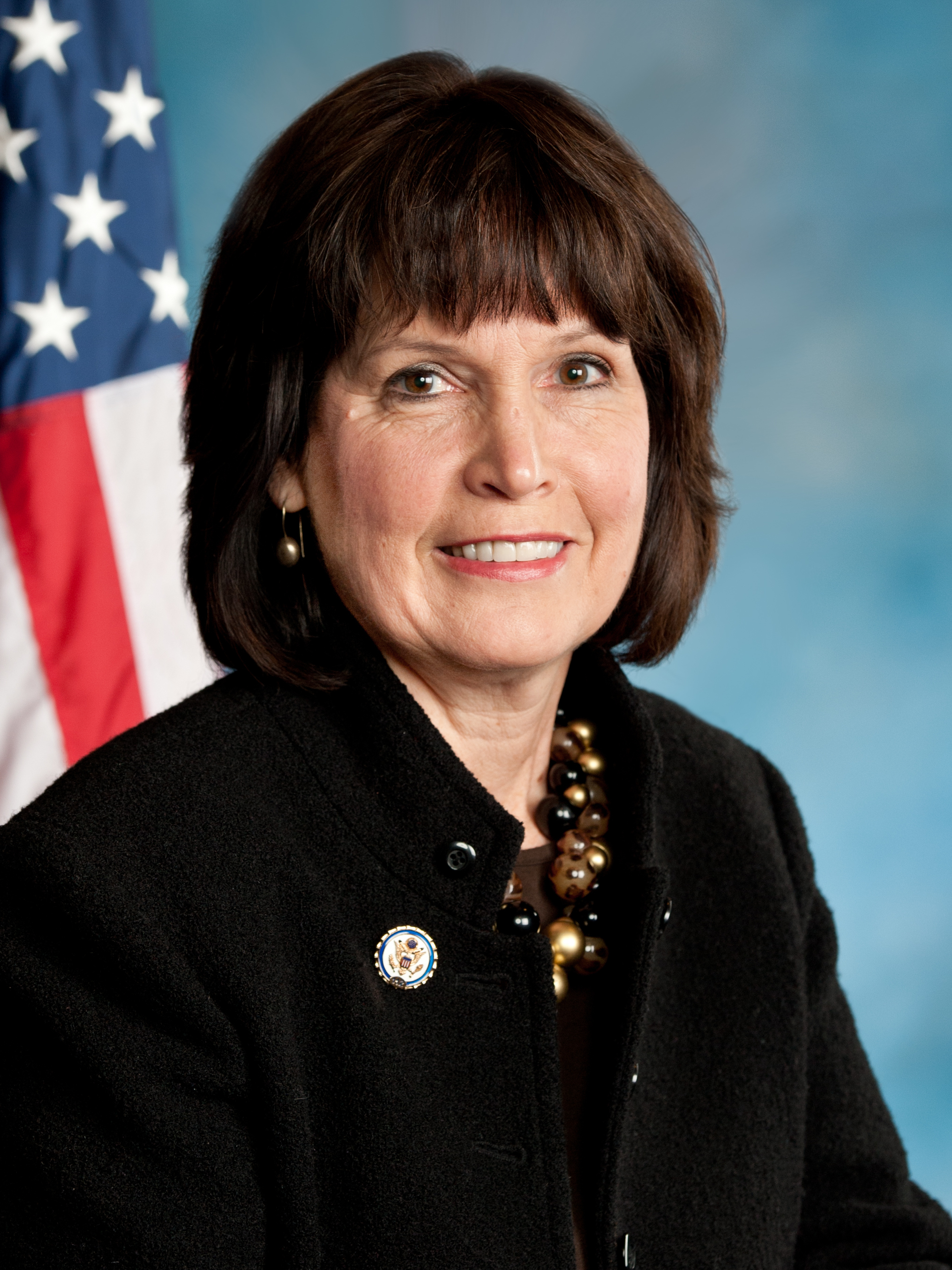

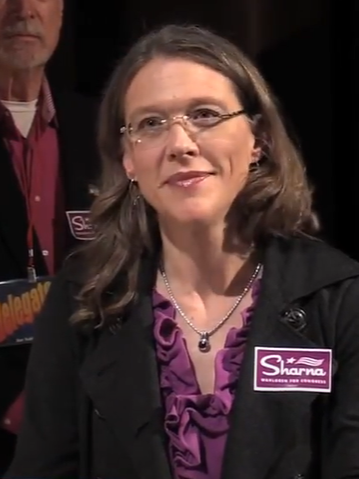

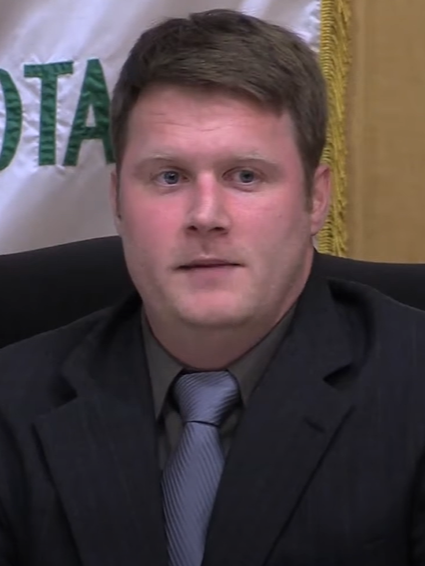
Nominee	Betty McCollum	Sharna Wahlgren	Dave Thomas
Party	Democratic (DFL)	Republican	Independence
Popular vote	147,857	79,492	14,059
Percentage	61.2%	32.9%	5.8%
- Precinct results McCollum: 40–50% 50–60% 60–70% 70–80% 80–90% Wahlgren: 40–50% 50–60% 60–70% No votes
U.S. Representative before election
Betty McCollum
Democratic (DFL)
Elected U.S. Representative
Betty McCollum
Democratic (DFL)

Incumbent Democrat Betty McCollum, who had represented the district since 2001, ran for re-election. She was re-elected with 62% of the vote in 2012, and the district had a PVI of D+11.

=== Democratic–Farmer–Labor primary ===
==== Candidates ====
===== Nominee =====
- Betty McCollum, incumbent U.S. Representative

=== Republican primary ===
==== Candidates ====
===== Nominee =====
- Sharna Wahlgren, attorney

=== Independence primary ===
==== Candidates ====
===== Nominee =====
- Dave Thomas, educator, firefighter, and Iraq War veteran

=== General election ===
==== Polling ====
Poll source	Date(s) administered	Sample size	Margin of error	Betty McCollum (DFL)	Sharna Wahlgren (R)	Dave Thomas (I)	Undecided
New York Times/CBS News Battleground Tracker	October 16–23, 2014	251	± 9.0%	56%	32%	1%	11%

==== Predictions ====
Source	Ranking	As of
The Cook Political Report	Safe D	November 3, 2014
Rothenberg	Safe D	October 24, 2014
Sabato's Crystal Ball	Safe D	October 30, 2014
RCP	Safe D	November 2, 2014
Daily Kos Elections	Safe D	November 4, 2014

==== Results ====
Minnesota's 4th congressional district, 2014
Party	Candidate	Votes	%
Democratic (DFL)	Betty McCollum (incumbent)	147,857	61.2
Republican	Sharna Wahlgren	79,492	32.9
Independence	Dave Thomas	14,059	5.8
Write-in		229	0.1
Total votes		241,637	100.0
Democratic (DFL) hold			

==== Finances ====
===== Campaigns =====
Candidate (party)	Raised	Spent	Cash on hand
Betty McCollum (DFL)	$863,235	$740,086	$171,163
Sharna Wahlgren (R)	$131,727	$130,282	$1,445
Dave Thomas (I)	Unreported		

===== Outside Spending =====
Candidate (party)	Supported	Opposed
Betty McCollum (DFL)	$3,679	$0
Sharna Wahlgren (R)	$0	$0
Dave Thomas (I)	$0	$0

== District 5 ==
2014 Minnesota's 5th congressional district election
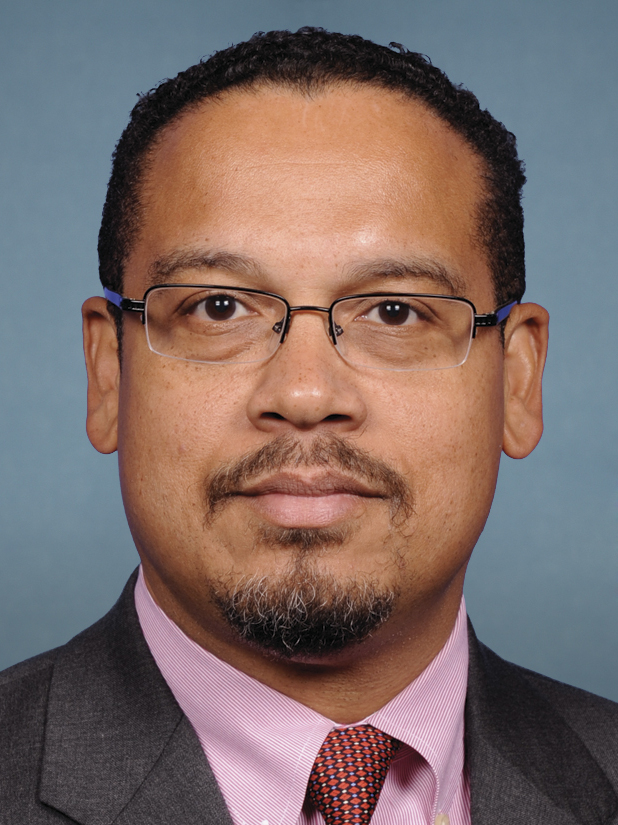

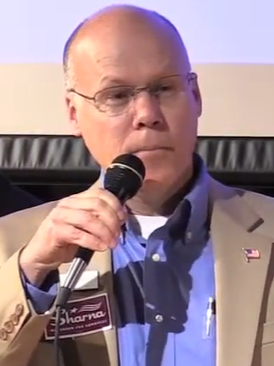

Nominee	Keith Ellison	Doug Daggett	Lee Bauer
Party	Democratic (DFL)	Republican	Independence
Popular vote	167,079	56,577	12,001
Percentage	70.8%	24.0%	5.1%
- Precinct results Ellison: 50–60% 60–70% 70–80% 80–90% >90% Daggett: 40–50% 50–60% No votes
U.S. Representative before election
Keith Ellison
Democratic (DFL)
Elected U.S. Representative
Keith Ellison
Democratic (DFL)

Incumbent Democrat Keith Ellison, who had represented the district since 2007, ran for re-election. He was re-elected with 75% of the vote in 2012, and the district had a PVI of D+22.

=== Democratic–Farmer–Labor primary ===
==== Candidates ====
===== Nominee =====
- Keith Ellison, incumbent U.S. Representative

=== Republican primary ===
==== Candidates ====
===== Nominee =====
- Doug Daggett, sales rep

=== Independence primary ===
==== Candidates ====
===== Nominee =====
- Lee Bauer, machinist

=== General election ===
==== Polling ====
Poll source	Date(s) administered	Sample size	Margin of error	Keith Ellison (DFL)	Doug Daggett (R)	Lee Bauer (I)	Undecided
New York Times/CBS News Battleground Tracker	October 16–23, 2014	266	± 9.0%	74%	23%	1%	3%

==== Predictions ====
Source	Ranking	As of
The Cook Political Report	Safe D	November 3, 2014
Rothenberg	Safe D	October 24, 2014
Sabato's Crystal Ball	Safe D	October 30, 2014
RCP	Safe D	November 2, 2014
Daily Kos Elections	Safe D	November 4, 2014

==== Results ====
Minnesota's 5th congressional district, 2014
Party	Candidate	Votes	%
Democratic (DFL)	Keith Ellison (incumbent)	167,079	70.8
Republican	Doug Daggett	56,577	24.0
Independence	Lee Bauer	12,001	5.1
Write-in		353	0.1
Total votes		236,010	100.0
Democratic (DFL) hold			

==== Finances ====
===== Campaigns =====
Candidate (party)	Raised	Spent	Cash on hand
Keith Ellison (DFL)	$2,090,932	$1,984,754	$162,748
Doug Daggett (R)	$41,565	$39,019	$2,346
Lee Bauer (I)	Unreported		

===== Outside Spending =====
Candidate (party)	Supported	Opposed
Keith Ellison (DFL)	$1,842	$0
Doug Daggett (R)	$0	$0
Lee Bauer (I)	$0	$0

== District 6 ==
2014 Minnesota's 6th congressional district election
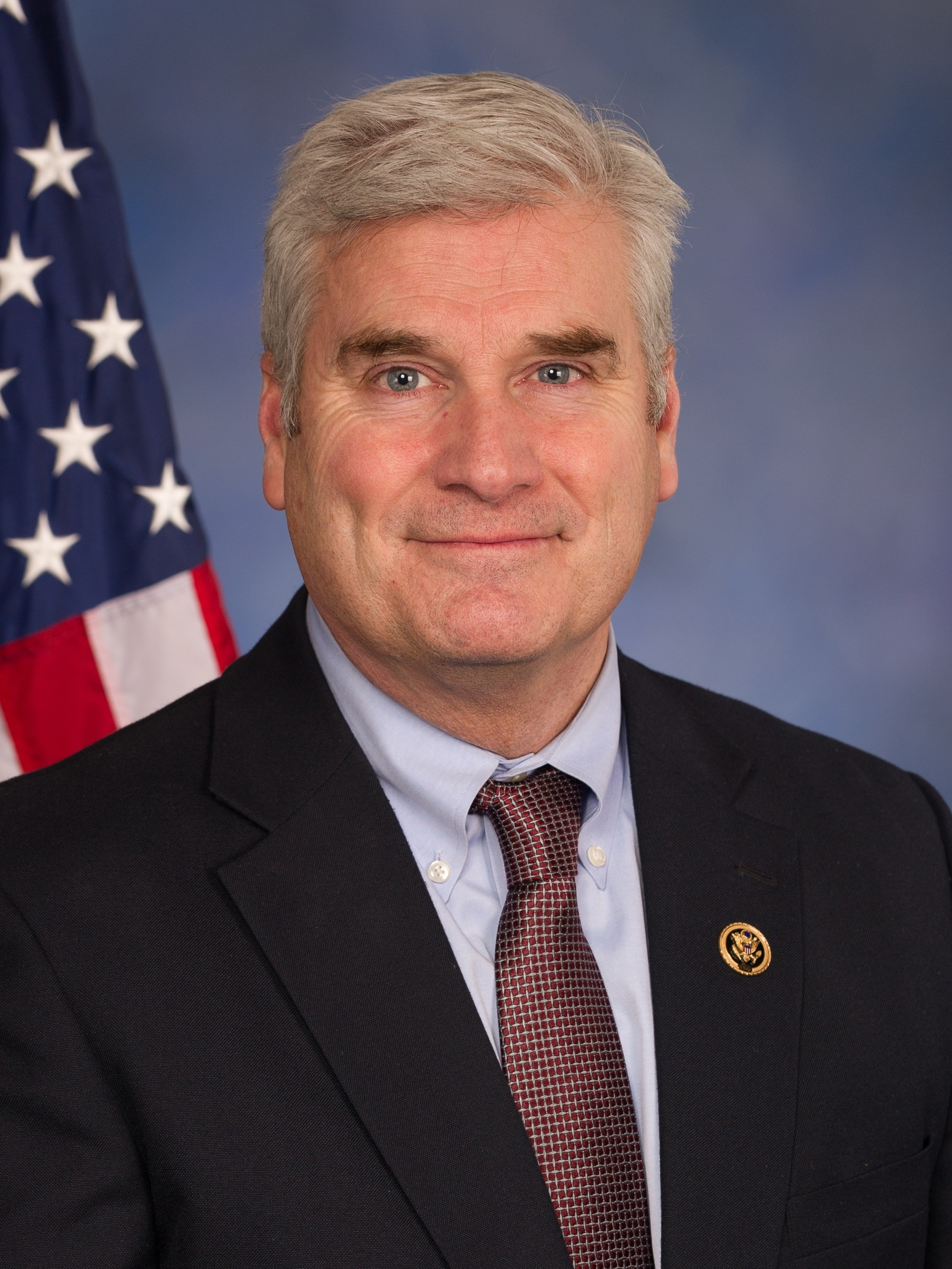

Nominee	Tom Emmer	Joe Perske	John Denney
Party	Republican	Democratic (DFL)	Independence
Popular vote	133,328	90,926	12,457
Percentage	56.3%	38.4%	5.2%
- Precinct results Emmer: 40–50% 50–60% 60–70% 70–80% >90% Perske: 40–50% 50–60% 60–70% 80–90% Tie: 50% No votes
U.S. Representative before election
Michele Bachmann
Republican
Elected U.S. Representative
Tom Emmer
Republican

Incumbent Republican Michele Bachmann, who had represented the district since 2007, ran for re-election. She was re-elected with 51% of the vote in 2012, and the district had a PVI of R+10.

Bachmann had won re-election to a fourth term in 2012, defeating DFL nominee Jim Graves by approximately 1.2 points, despite Mitt Romney receiving 56% of the vote in this district in the 2012 presidential election. Facing a rematch with Graves, Bachmann announced on May 29, 2013, that she would not seek re-election.

=== Republican primary ===
Former state representative and 2010 gubernatorial nominee Tom Emmer and Anoka County Commissioner Rhonda Sivarajah sought the Republican nomination. Allan Levene, a Kennesaw, Georgia, resident who sought the Republican nomination in four congressional districts in four separate states, including Minnesota, ultimately did not file an affidavit of candidacy.

==== Candidates ====
===== Nominee =====
- Tom Emmer, former state representative and nominee for Governor in 2010

===== Eliminated in primary =====
- Rhonda Sivarajah, Anoka County Commissioner

===== Withdrawn =====
- Phil Krinkie, former state representative
- Allan Levene, resident of Georgia running in three other congressional races
- John Pederson, state senator

===== Declined =====
- Michele Bachmann, incumbent U.S. Representative

==== Polling ====
Poll source	Date(s) administered	Sample size	Margin of error	Tom Emmer	Phil Krinkie	Rhonda Sivarajah	Undecided
Public Opinion Strategies (R-Emmer)	April 16–17, 2014	300	± 5.7%	73%	4%	5%	18%

==== Results ====
Republican primary results
Party	Candidate	Votes	%
Republican	Tom Emmer	19,557	73.3
Republican	Rhonda Sivarajah	7,125	26.7
Total votes		26,682	100.0

=== Democratic–Farmer–Labor primary ===
Jim Graves, who had previously said he would run again, said he would continue to run after Bachmann retired. However, on May 31, 2013, Graves announced that he was suspending his campaign.

Joe Perske, Mayor of Sartell, Minnesota, was the DFL endorsed candidate and nominee. Judy Adams, a painter and environmental activist, and Jim Read, an author and professor of political science at the College of Saint Benedict and Saint John's University, both withdrew after failing to win the DFL endorsement.

==== Candidates ====
===== Nominee =====
- Joe Perske, Mayor of Sartell

===== Withdrawn =====
- Judy Adams, environmental activist
- Jim Graves, businessman and nominee for the seat in 2012
- Jim Read, professor at the College of Saint Benedict and Saint John's University

==== Results ====
Democratic–Farmer–Labor primary results
Party	Candidate	Votes	%
Democratic (DFL)	Joe Perske	10,070	100.0

=== Independence primary ===
==== Candidates ====
===== Nominee =====
- John Denney, law student

==== Results ====
Independence primary results
Party	Candidate	Votes	%
Independence	John Denney	467	100.0

=== General election ===
==== Endorsements ====
Tom Emmer (R)

Organizations

- National Republican Congressional Committee "Vanguard" Program

==== Polling ====
Poll source	Date(s) administered	Sample size	Margin of error	Tom Emmer (R)	Joe Perske (DFL)	John Denney (I)	Undecided
New York Times/CBS News Battleground Tracker	October 16–23, 2014	175	± 10.0%	57%	37%	0%	6%

==== Predictions ====
Source	Ranking	As of
The Cook Political Report	Safe R	November 3, 2014
Rothenberg	Safe R	October 24, 2014
Sabato's Crystal Ball	Safe R	October 30, 2014
RCP	Safe R	November 2, 2014
Daily Kos Elections	Safe R	November 4, 2014

==== Results ====
Minnesota's 6th congressional district, 2014
Party	Candidate	Votes	%
Republican	Tom Emmer	133,328	56.3
Democratic (DFL)	Joe Perske	90,926	38.4
Independence	John Denney	12,457	5.2
Write-in		135	0.1
Total votes		236,846	100.0
Republican hold			

==== Finances ====
===== Campaigns =====
Candidate (party)	Raised	Spent	Cash on hand
Tom Emmer (R)	$2,049,150	$2,030,950	$18,200
Joe Perske (DFL)	$223,413	$221,219	$783
John Denney (I)	$5,908	$6,220	$23

===== Outside Spending =====
Candidate (party)	Supported	Opposed
Tom Emmer (R)	$7,094	$0
Joe Perske (DFL)	$0	$0
John Denney (I)	$0	$6,220

== District 7 ==
2014 Minnesota's 7th congressional district election
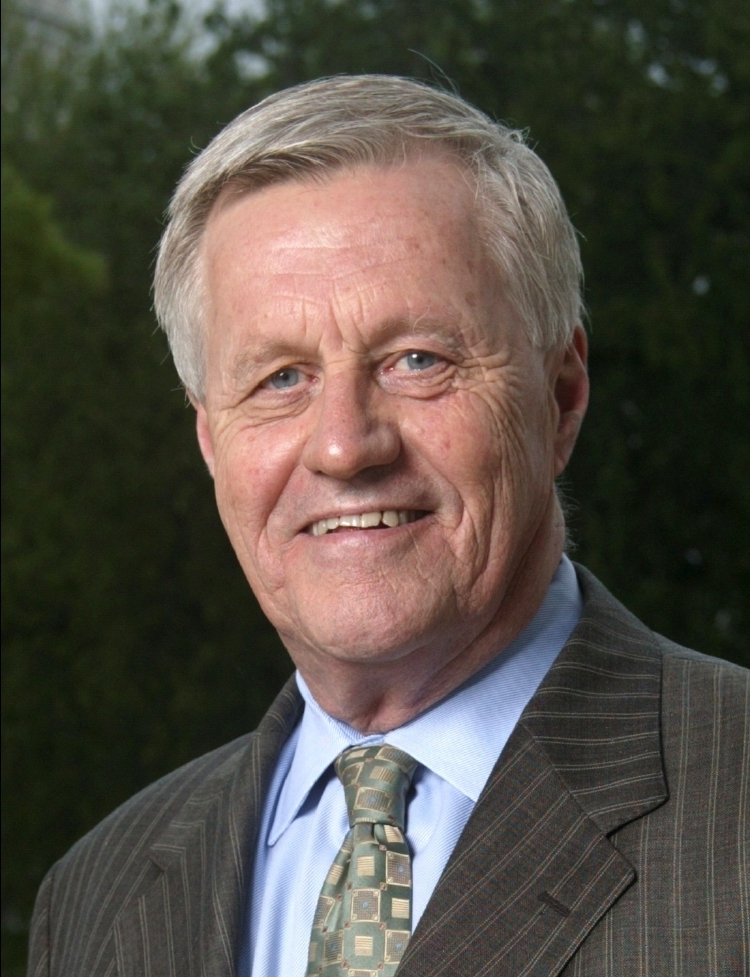

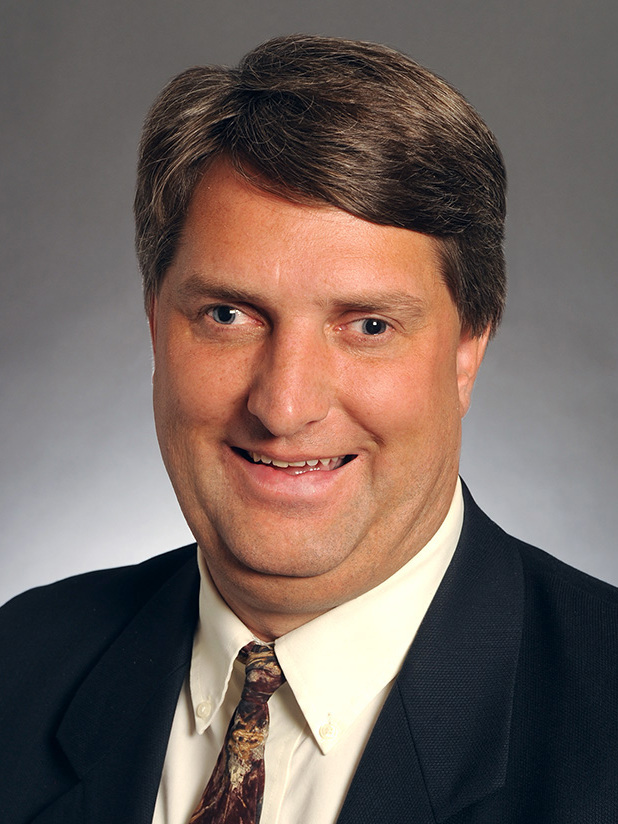
Nominee	Collin Peterson	Torrey Westrom
Party	Democratic (DFL)	Republican
Popular vote	130,546	109,955
Percentage	54.2%	45.7%
- Precinct results Peterson: 50–60% 60–70% 70–80% 80–90% >90% Westrom: 50–60% 60–70% 70–80% 80–90% >90% Tie: 40–50% 50% No votes
U.S. Representative before election
Collin Peterson
Democratic (DFL)
Elected U.S. Representative
Collin Peterson
Democratic (DFL)

The 7th district covers almost the entire western side of Minnesota. It is the largest district in the state and one of the largest in the country and includes the cities of Moorhead, Willmar, Alexandria, and Fergus Falls. Incumbent Democrat Collin Peterson, who had represented the district since 1991, ran for re-election. He was re-elected with 60% of the vote in 2012 and the district had a PVI of R+6.

=== Democratic–Farmer–Labor primary ===
In 2013, Republicans began pressuring Peterson, in hopes of convincing him to retire. His seat was one of only a handful that was represented by a Democrat but was carried by Republican presidential nominee Mitt Romney in the 2012 election and was seen as a top pick-up opportunity had Peterson retired. Their tactics included airing television advertisements, hiring a press staffer to give opposition research to reporters, hiring a tracker to follow him around his district and record him, and sending mobile billboards with critical statements on them to drive around his hometown. Peterson responded by saying "They don't have anybody else to go after. It's kind of ridiculous, but whatever." After Republicans spread rumors that Peterson was planning to buy a house in Florida and retire there, he said: "I went from neutral on running again to 90 percent just because of this stupid stuff they're doing. You can't let these people be in charge of anything, in my opinion." On March 17, 2014, Peterson officially announced that he was running for re-election, saying, "I still have a lot of work to do."

==== Candidates ====
===== Nominee =====
- Collin Peterson, incumbent U.S. Representative

===== Declined =====
- Paul Marquart, state representative

=== Republican primary ===
==== Candidates ====
===== Nominee =====
- Torrey Westrom, state senator

===== Declined =====
- Dan Fabian, state representative
- Mary Franson, state representative
- Bill Ingebrigtsen, state senator
- Morrie Lanning, former state representative
- Marty Seifert, former Minority Leader of the Minnesota House of Representatives and candidate for Governor of Minnesota in 2010 and 2014
- Scott Van Binsbergen, businessman

=== General election ===
==== Endorsements ====
Torrey Westrom (R)

Organizations

- National Republican Congressional Committee "Young Guns" Program

==== Polling ====
Poll source	Date(s) administered	Sample size	Margin of error	Collin Peterson (DFL)	Torrey Westrom (R)	Undecided
New York Times/CBS News Battleground Tracker	October 16–23, 2014	313	± 8.0%	46%	44%	10%
Tarrance Group (R-NRCC)	October 12–14, 2014	300	± 5.8%	43%	44%	13%
SurveyUSA	October 3–6, 2014	545	± 4.3%	50%	41%	10%
Tarrance Group (R-Westrom)	September 21–23, 2014	402	± 4.9%	45%	40%	15%
Global Strategy Group (D-Peterson)	September 4–7, 2014	405	± 4.9%	53%	29%	18%
Tarrance Group (R-Westrom)	February 3–5, 2014	400	± 4.9%	46%	39%	15%

==== Predictions ====
Source	Ranking	As of
The Cook Political Report	Lean D	November 3, 2014
Rothenberg	Lean D	October 24, 2014
Sabato's Crystal Ball	Lean D	October 30, 2014
RCP	Lean D	November 2, 2014
Daily Kos Elections	Tossup	November 4, 2014

==== Results ====
Minnesota's 7th congressional district, 2014
Party	Candidate	Votes	%
Democratic (DFL)	Collin Peterson (incumbent)	130,546	54.2
Republican	Torrey Westrom	109,955	45.7
Write-in		334	0.1
Total votes		240,835	100.0
Democratic (DFL) hold			

==== Finances ====
===== Campaigns =====
Candidate (party)	Raised	Spent	Cash on hand
Collin Peterson (DFL)	$1,585,616	$1,569,350	$50,682
Torrey Westrom (R)	$1,034,570	$1,022,303	$12,267

===== Outside Spending =====
Candidate (party)	Supported	Opposed
Collin Peterson (DFL)	$504,537	$4,834,653
Torrey Westrom (R)	$89,633	$3,501,426

== District 8 ==
2014 Minnesota's 8th congressional district election
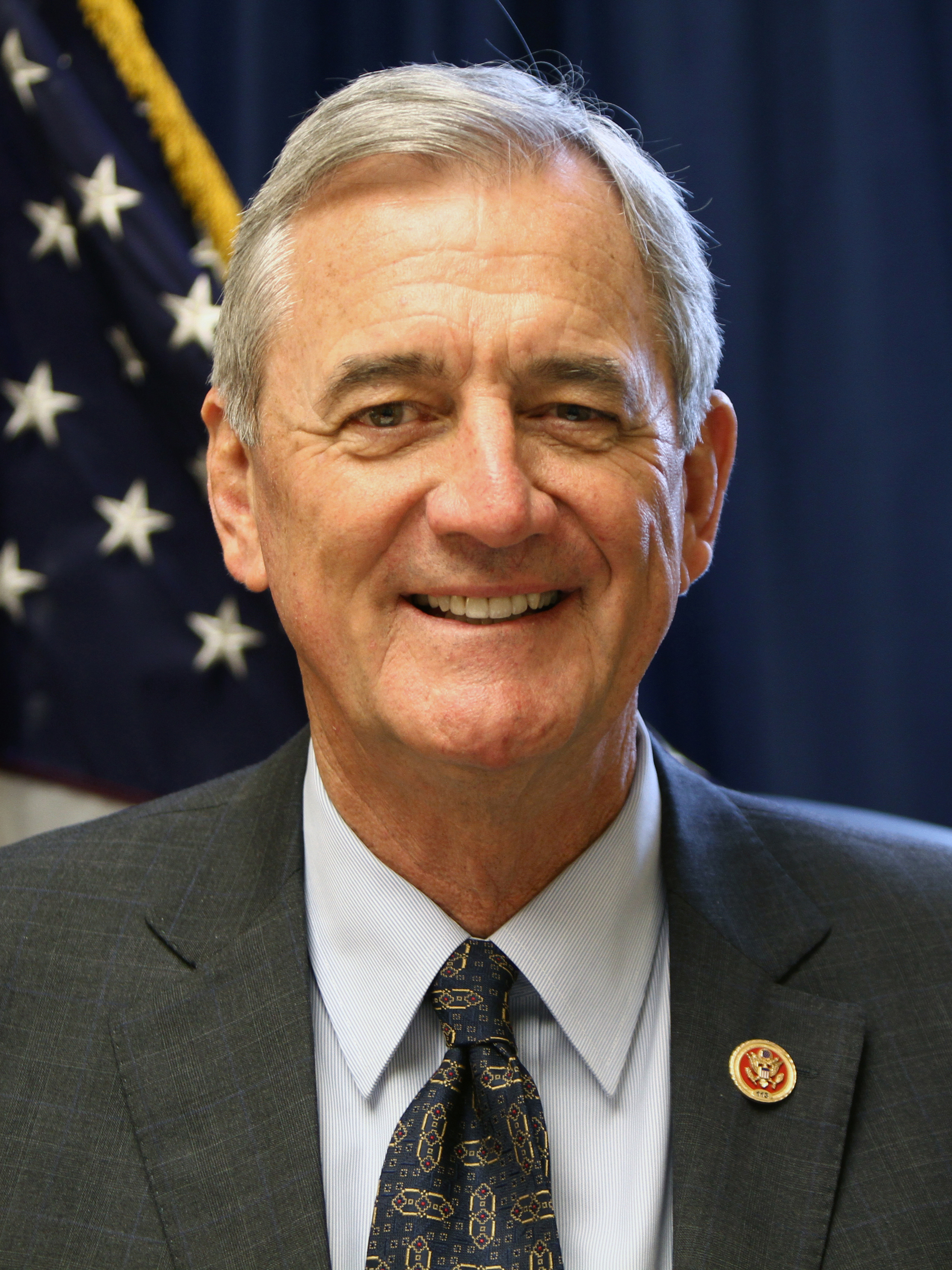

Nominee	Rick Nolan	Stewart Mills III
Party	Democratic (DFL)	Republican
Popular vote	129,090	125,358
Percentage	48.5%	47.1%
- Precinct results Nolan: 40–50% 50–60% 60–70% 70–80% 80–90% >90% Mills: 40–50% 50–60% 60–70% 70–80% 80–90% >90% Tie: 40–50% 50% No votes
U.S. Representative before election
Rick Nolan
Democratic (DFL)
Elected U.S. Representative
Rick Nolan
Democratic (DFL)

Incumbent Democrat Rick Nolan, who had represented the district since 2013, ran for re-election. He was elected with 54% of the vote in 2012, and the district had a PVI of D+1.

=== Democratic–Farmer–Labor primary ===
==== Candidates ====
===== Nominee =====
- Rick Nolan, incumbent U.S. Representative

=== Republican primary ===
==== Candidates ====
===== Nominee =====
- Stewart Mills III, Mills Fleet Farm executive

=== Independence primary ===
==== Candidates ====
===== Withdrawn =====
- Eric Meyer

=== Green primary ===
==== Candidates ====
===== Nominee =====
- Ray (Skip) Sandman, retired corrections officer

=== General election ===
==== Endorsements ====
Rick Nolan (DFL)

Organizations

- Democratic Congressional Campaign Committee "Frontline" Program
Stewart Mills (R)

Organizations

- National Republican Congressional Committee "Young Guns" Program

==== Polling ====
Poll source	Date(s) administered	Sample size	Margin of error	Rick Nolan (DFL)	Stewart Mills (R)	Skip Sandman (G)	Undecided
New York Times/CBS News Battleground Tracker	October 16–23, 2014	375	± 7.0%	47%	42%	1%	9%
KSTP/SurveyUSA	October 9–12, 2014	555	± 4.2%	39%	47%	4%	11%
Greenberg Quinlan Rosner (D-DCCC)	September 25–28, 2014	405	± 4.9%	48%	37%	7%	9%

==== Predictions ====
Source	Ranking	As of
The Cook Political Report	Tossup	November 3, 2014
Rothenberg	Tossup	October 24, 2014
Sabato's Crystal Ball	Lean R (flip)	October 30, 2014
RCP	Tossup	November 2, 2014
Daily Kos Elections	Tossup	November 4, 2014

==== Results ====
Minnesota's 8th congressional district, 2014
Party	Candidate	Votes	%
Democratic (DFL)	Rick Nolan (incumbent)	129,090	48.5
Republican	Stewart Mills III	125,358	47.1
Green	Skip Sandman	11,450	4.3
Write-in		185	0.1
Total votes		266,083	100.0
Democratic (DFL) hold			

==== Finances ====
===== Campaigns =====
Candidate (party)	Raised	Spent	Cash on hand
Rick Nolan (DFL)	$2,098,795	$2,113,281	$26,663
Stewart Mills III (R)	$2,088,029	$2,087,731	$298
Ray Sandman (G)	Unreported		

===== Outside Spending =====
Candidate (party)	Supported	Opposed
Rick Nolan (DFL)	$851,269	$5,045,015
Stewart Mills III (R)	$990,241	$5,920,921
Ray Sandman (G)	$0	$16,853

== See also ==
- 2014 Minnesota elections
- 2014 United States House of Representatives elections
