= CaringBridge =

U.S. nonprofit organization

- Formation: 1997
- Purpose: Non-profit Social Network and Health Crisis Information Portal
- Key people: Sona Mehring, founder
- Website: www.caringbridge.org

CaringBridge Inc. is a charitable 501(c)(3) non-profit organization established in 1997 which allows people facing various medical conditions and their family and friends to communicate. CaringBridge is headquartered in Eagan, Minnesota.

== Purpose ==
CaringBridge allows patients, caregivers, families, and friends to exchange information about a patient's medical condition on an ongoing basis. The websites are designed to become conduits between patients, their families, friends, neighbors, and colleagues.

== History ==
CaringBridge was created in 1997 by Sona Mehring when her close friend gave premature birth to a daughter. The site was intended to keep family and friends informed about the child.

== See also ==
- Virtual community
