= 2016 United States House of Representatives elections in Minnesota =

- November 8, 2016

All 8 Minnesota seats to the United States House of Representatives
	Majority party	Minority party
Party	Democratic (DFL)	Republican
Last election	5	3
Seats won	5	3
Seat change	Steady	Steady
Popular vote	1,434,590	1,334,686
Percentage	50.15%	46.66%
Swing	▼0.05%	▲0.13%

Democratic
40–50%
50–60%
60–70%
70–80%
Republican
40–50%
50–60%
60–70%
70–80%

The 2016 United States House of Representatives elections in Minnesota were held on November 8, 2016, to elect the eight U.S. representatives from the state of Minnesota, one from each of the state's eight congressional districts. The elections coincided with the 2016 U.S. presidential election, as well as other elections to the House of Representatives, elections to the United States Senate and various state and local elections. The primaries were held on August 9.

This is the last cycle where the Democratic candidate would win either the 1st or 8th district and the last cycle Republicans candidate would win either the 2nd or 3rd district. However, the 1st district in Minnesota would regain until 2026.

== Overview ==
=== Statewide ===
Party	Candidates	Votes		Seats		
Party	Candidates	No.	%	No.	+/–	%
Democratic-Farmer-Labor	8	1,434,590	50.15	5	Steady	62.50
Republican	8	1,334,686	46.66	3	Steady	37.50
Legal Marijuana Now	2	57,911	2.02	0	Steady	0.0
Independence	1	28,869	1.01	0	Steady	0.0
Write-in	8	4,376	0.15	0	Steady	0.0
Total	27	2,860,432	100.0	8	Steady	100.0

Popular vote
Democratic	50.15%
Republican	46.66%
Legal Marijuana	2.02%
Independence	1.01%
Other	0.15%

House seats
Democratic	62.50%
Republican	37.50%

=== By district ===
Results of the 2016 United States House of Representatives elections in Minnesota by district:

District	Democratic		Republican		Others		Total		Result
District	Votes	%	Votes	%	Votes	%	Votes	%	Result
District 1	169,074	50.34%	166,526	49.58%	277	0.08%	335,600	100.00%	Democratic hold
District 2	167,315	45.16%	173,970	46.95%	29,229	7.89%	370,514	100.00%	Republican hold
District 3	169,243	43.01%	223,077	56.70%	1,144	0.29%	393,464	100.00%	Republican hold
District 4	203,299	57.76%	121,032	34.39%	27,613	7.85%	351,944	100.00%	Democratic hold
District 5	249,964	69.07%	80,660	22.29%	31,258	8.64%	361,882	100.00%	Democratic hold
District 6	123,008	34.27%	235,380	65.58%	536	0.15%	358,924	100.00%	Republican hold
District 7	173,589	52.47%	156,952	47.44%	307	0.09%	330,848	100.00%	Democratic hold
District 8	179,098	50.17%	177,089	49.61%	792	0.22%	356,979	100.00%	Democratic hold
Total	1,434,590	50.15%	1,334,686	46.66%	91,156	3.19%	2,860,432	100.00%	

== District 1 ==
2016 Minnesota's 1st congressional district election
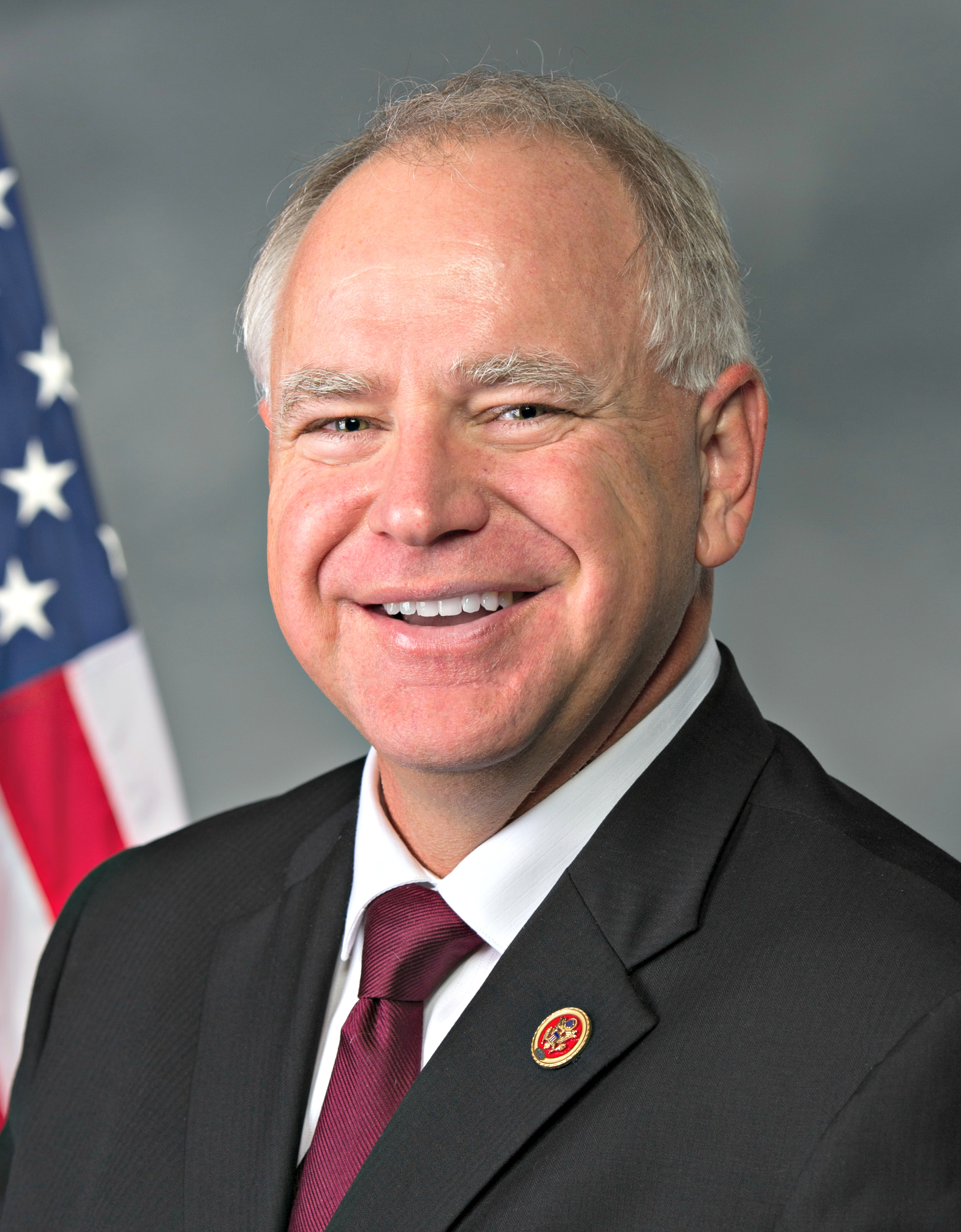

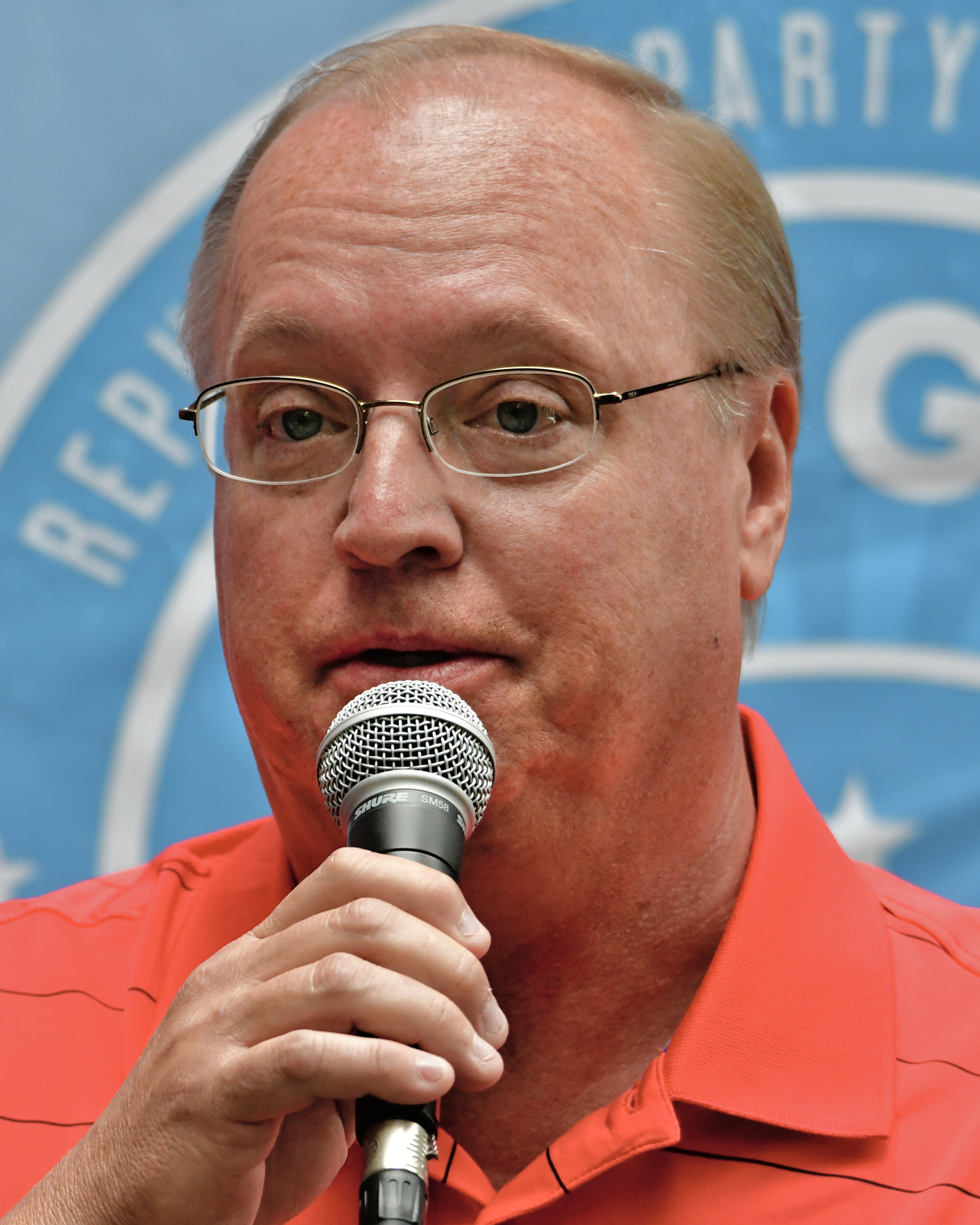
Nominee	Tim Walz	Jim Hagedorn
Party	Democratic (DFL)	Republican
Popular vote	169,074	166,526
Percentage	50.3%	49.6%
- Walz: 50–60% 60–70% 70–80% 80–90% Hagedorn: 50–60% 60–70% 70–80% 80–90% >90% Tie: 40–50% 50% No votes
U.S. Representative before election
Tim Walz
Democratic (DFL)
Elected U.S. Representative
Tim Walz
Democratic (DFL)

Incumbent Democrat Tim Walz, who had represented the district since 2007, ran for re-election. He was re-elected with 54% of the vote in 2014. The district had a PVI of R+1. This is the most recent election for this congressional district to be won by a Democrat.

=== Democratic primary ===
==== Candidates ====
===== Nominee =====
- Tim Walz, incumbent U.S. Representative

==== Results ====
Democratic primary results
Party	Candidate	Votes	%
Democratic (DFL)	Tim Walz (incumbent)	13,538	100.0
Total votes		13,538	100.0

=== Republican primary ===
==== Candidates ====
===== Nominee =====
- Jim Hagedorn, blogger, candidate for this seat in 2010 and nominee in 2014

===== Eliminated in primary =====
- Stephen Williams, farmer and Independence nominee for the U.S. Senate 2012, candidate in 2008 and 2012 and candidate for Lieutenant Governor in 2010

==== Results ====
Republican primary results
Party	Candidate	Votes	%
Republican	Jim Hagedorn	10,851	76.5
Republican	Steve Williams	3,330	23.5
Total votes		14,181	100.0

=== General election ===
==== Endorsements ====
Tim Walz (DFL)

Labor unions

- AFL-CIO
- American Federation of State, County and Municipal Employees
- International Association of Sheet Metal, Air, Rail and Transportation Workers

==== Predictions ====
Source	Ranking	As of
The Cook Political Report	Safe D	November 7, 2016
Daily Kos Elections	Safe D	November 7, 2016
Rothenberg	Safe D	November 3, 2016
Sabato's Crystal Ball	Safe D	November 7, 2016
RCP	Likely D	October 31, 2016

==== Results ====
Minnesota's 1st congressional district, 2016
Party	Candidate	Votes	%
Democratic (DFL)	Tim Walz (incumbent)	169,074	50.3
Republican	Jim Hagedorn	166,526	49.6
Write-in		277	0.1
Total votes		335,877	100.0
Democratic (DFL) hold			

==== Finances ====
===== Campaigns =====
Candidate (party)	Raised	Spent	Cash on hand
Tim Walz (DFL)	$1,547,890	$1,585,118	$42,071
Jim Hagedorn (R)	$354,204	$356,277	$225

===== Outside Spending =====
Candidate (party)	Supported	Opposed
Tim Walz (DFL)	$0	$0
Jim Hagedorn (R)	$1,463	$0

== District 2 ==
2016 Minnesota's 2nd congressional district election
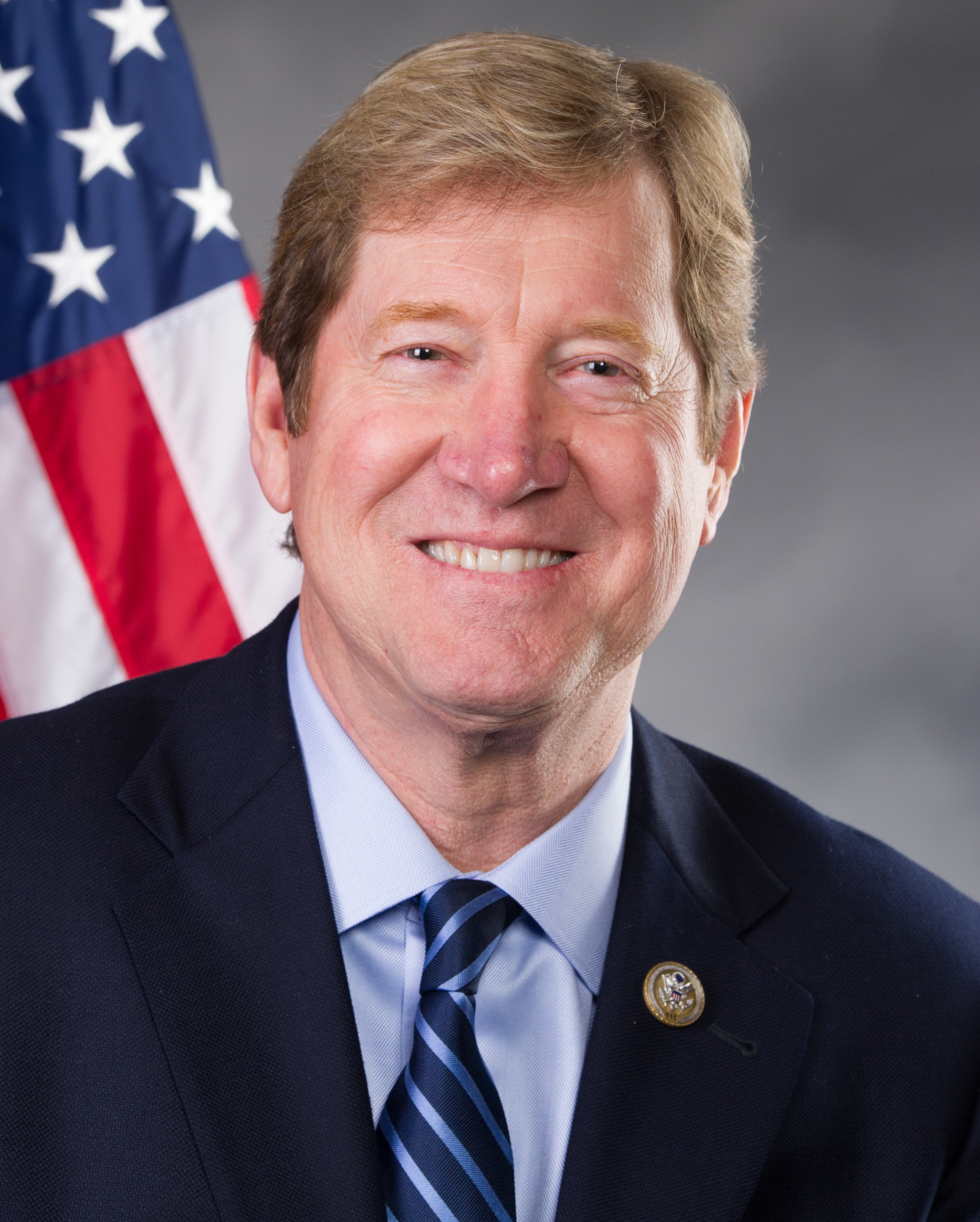

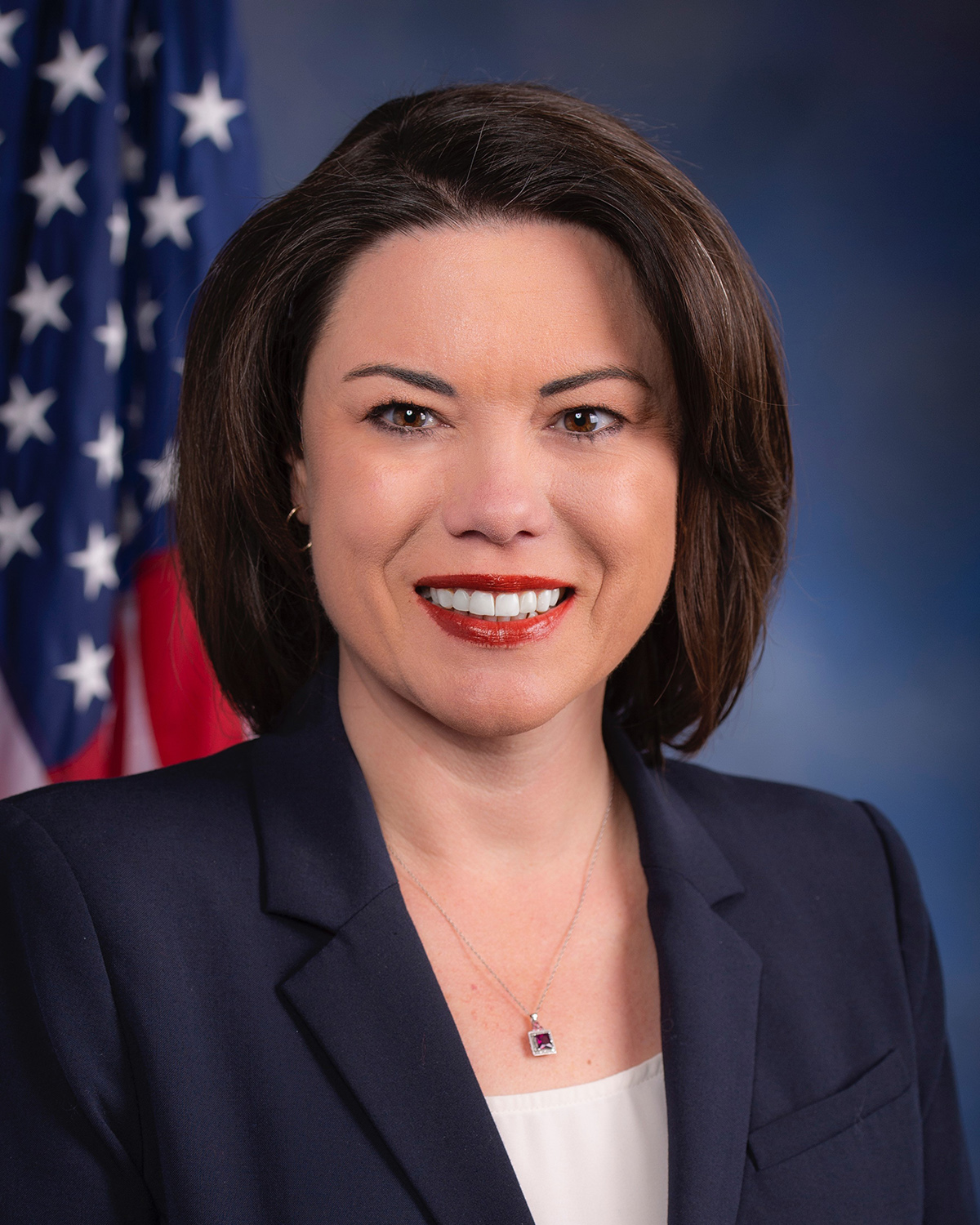

Nominee	Jason Lewis	Angie Craig	Paula Overby
Party	Republican	Democratic (DFL)	Independence
Popular vote	173,970	167,315	28,869
Percentage	46.9%	45.2%	7.8%
- County results Craig: 40–50% 60–70% Lewis: 50–60%

- Precinct results Lewis: 30–40% 40–50% 50–60% 60–70% 70–80% Craig: 40–50% 50–60% 60–70% 70–80% 80–90% >90% Tie: 40–50%
U.S. Representative before election
John Kline
Republican
Elected U.S. Representative
Jason Lewis
Republican

Incumbent Republican John Kline, who had represented the district since 2003, announced that he would not seek re-election. He was re-elected with 56% of the vote in 2014. The district had a PVI of R+2.

=== Republican primary ===
==== Candidates ====
===== Nominee =====
- Jason Lewis, political commentator, former talk radio host, and nominee for Colorado's 2nd district in 1990

===== Eliminated in primary =====
- Matthew Erickson, Minnesota spokesperson for Donald Trump
- John Howe, former state senator, former mayor of Red Wing and candidate for Minnesota Secretary of State in 2014
- Darlene Miller, president and CEO of Permac Industries and member of the President's Council on Jobs and Competitiveness

===== Withdrawn =====
- David Benson-Staebler, political consultant, former Democratic congressional aide, and real estate agent
- David Gerson, engineer and candidate in 2012 and 2014
- Pam Myhra, former state representative and candidate for lieutenant governor in 2014

===== Declined =====
- Tony Albright, state representative
- Ted Daley, former state senator
- Steve Drazkowski, state representative
- Pat Garofalo, state representative
- John Kline, incumbent U.S. Representative
- John Kriesel, former state representative
- Mike McFadden, businessman and nominee for U.S. Senate in 2014
- Mary Pawlenty, former Dakota County District Court Judge and former First Lady of Minnesota
- Roz Peterson, state representative
- Eric Pratt, state senator
- Steve Sviggum, former Speaker of the Minnesota House of Representatives
- Dave Thompson, state senator and candidate for governor in 2014

==== Endorsements ====
David Gerson (withdrawn)

Organizations

- Madison Project
John Howe

Organizations

- NRA Political Victory Fund
Jason Lewis

State legislators

- Steve Drazkowski, state representative
- Dan Hall, state senator
- Dave Thompson, state senator and candidate for governor in 2014

Organizations

- Republican Party of Minnesota

Individuals

- Bill Cooper, former chair of the Republican Party of Minnesota
Darlene Miller

Organizations

- Maggie's List

==== Debate ====
2016 Minnesota's 2nd congressional district republican primary debate
No.	Date	Host	Moderator	Link	Republican	Republican	Republican	Republican	Republican
Key: P Participant A Absent N Not invited I Invited W Withdrawn									
Key: P Participant A Absent N Not invited I Invited W Withdrawn					David Benson-Staebler	David Gerson	John Howe	Jason Lewis	Pam Myhra
1	Nov. 19, 2015	Republicans in Senate District 52			P	P	P	P	P

==== Results ====
Republican primary results
Party	Candidate	Votes	%
Republican	Jason Lewis	11,641	48.9
Republican	Darlene Miller	7,305	30.7
Republican	John Howe	3,244	13.6
Republican	Matthew D. Erickson	1,612	6.8
Total votes		23,802	100.0

=== Democratic primary ===
Democrat Angela Craig, who served as vice president of global human resources for St. Jude Medical, resigned from her position in January 2015 to challenge Lewis. Mary Lawrence, a doctor, also ran as a Democrat, but dropped out before the primary.

==== Candidates ====
===== Nominee =====
- Angie Craig, former St. Jude Medical executive

===== Withdrawn =====
- Roger Kittelson, dairy marketing specialist, nominee for WI-06 in 2008 and candidate for Minnesota House of Representatives in 1982 and 2014
- Mary Lawrence, ophthalmologist

===== Declined =====
- Joe Atkins, state representative
- Rick Hansen, state representative
- Mike Obermueller, former state representative and nominee in 2012 and 2014

==== Results ====
Democratic primary results
Party	Candidate	Votes	%
Democratic (DFL)	Angie Craig	15,155	100.0
Total votes		15,155	100.0

=== Independence primary ===
==== Candidates ====
===== Nominee =====
- Paula Overby, quality assurance analyst and nominee for this seat in 2014

=== General election ===
==== Campaign ====
Commentators wrote that the election was "likely to be one of the most-watched congressional races in the country," (MinnPost), "expected to be one of the most competitive in the country", according to Roll Call newspaper, and "seen as a prime target for Democrats to flip" according to The Atlantic.

Area left-wing weekly City Pages described the campaign as resembling the 2016 presidential campaign, calling Lewis "an entrepreneur and media personality, whose blunt rhetoric is refreshingly honest to some, simply offensive to others", and describing Craig as "a tough female leader with moderate positions, ties to big business, and a penchant for pantsuits".

In May 2016, the Rothenberg and Gonzales Political Report changed its rating of the race from "pure tossup" to "tossup/tilt Democratic," with political analyst Nathan Gonzales writing that Craig "is probably to the left of the district in her ideology, but she has a good story to tell, is raising considerable money (she had $1.3 million in the bank at the end of March) and is solid as a candidate." Other political prognosticators rated the race "Republican Toss-up" (Charlie Cook), and "pure" toss-up (Larry Sabato's "Crystal Ball"), according to MinnPost.

==== Endorsements ====
Jason Lewis (R)

State legislators

- Steve Drazkowski, state representative
- Dan Hall, state senator
- Dave Thompson, state senator and candidate for governor in 2014

Organizations

- National Republican Congressional Committee "Young Guns" Program
- Republican Party of Minnesota

Individuals

- Bill Cooper, former chair of the Republican Party of Minnesota
Angie Craig (DFL)

U.S. Senators

- Al Franken, U.S. Senator (D-MN)

U.S. Representatives

- Keith Ellison, U.S. Representative (MN-05)
- Jared Polis, U.S. Representative (CO-02)
- Mark Takano, U.S. Representative (CA-41)
- Tim Walz, U.S. Representative (MN-01)

State legislators

- Jim Carlson, state senator
- Greg Clausen, state senator
- Scott Dibble, state senator
- Laurie Halverson, state representative
- Sandra Masin, state representative
- Will Morgan, former state representative
- Erin Murphy, state representative
- Sandy Pappas, President of the Minnesota Senate
- Mike Obermueller, former state representative and nominee in 2012 and 2014
- Dan Schoen, state representative
- Katie Sieben, state senator

Labor unions

- AFL-CIO
- American Federation of State, County and Municipal Employees
- International Association of Sheet Metal, Air, Rail and Transportation Workers
- International Brotherhood of Teamsters
- International Union of Painters and Allied Trades District Council 82
- United Steelworkers

Organizations

- Democratic Congressional Campaign Committee "Red to Blue" Program
- EMILY's List
- Gay & Lesbian Victory Fund
- Human Rights Campaign
- NARAL Pro-Choice America
- Stonewall DFL Caucus
- WomenWinning

Local officials

- Ann Counihan, South St. Paul School Board member
- Mike Engel, Mayor of Kenyon
- Debbie Goettel, Mayor of Richfield
- Matt Klein, ISD 197 School Board member

==== Debates ====
- Complete video of debate, October 30, 2016

==== Polling ====
Poll source	Date(s) administered	Sample size	Margin of error	Jason Lewis (R)	Angie Craig (DFL)	Paula Overby (I)	Undecided
SurveyUSA	October 13–16, 2016	600	± 4.1%	41%	46%	—	12%
WPA Opinion Research (R-NRCC)	October 9–10, 2016	400	± 4.9%	36%	33%	—	26%
GBA Strategies (D-Craig)	August 13–16, 2016	500	± 4.4%	42%	43%	9%	6%
WPA Opinion Research (R-Lewis/NRCC)	August 14–15, 2016	400	± 4.9%	39%	27%	7%	25%

==== Predictions ====
Source	Ranking	As of
The Cook Political Report	Tossup	November 7, 2016
Daily Kos Elections	Tossup	November 7, 2016
Rothenberg	Tilt D (flip)	November 3, 2016
Sabato's Crystal Ball	Lean D (flip)	November 7, 2016
RCP	Lean D (flip)	October 31, 2016

==== Results ====
Lewis ended up defeating Craig by several thousand votes.

Minnesota's 2nd congressional district, 2016
Party	Candidate	Votes	%
Republican	Jason Lewis	173,970	46.9
Democratic (DFL)	Angie Craig	167,315	45.2
Independence	Paula Overby	28,869	7.8
Write-in		360	0.1
Total votes		370,514	100.0
Republican hold			

==== Finances ====
===== Campaigns =====
Candidate (party)	Raised	Spent	Cash on hand
Jason Lewis (R)	$1,030,485	$1,020,649	$9,837
Angie Craig (DFL)	$4,025,326	$4,012,823	$12,503
Paula Overby (I)	Unreported		

===== Outside Spending =====
Candidate (party)	Supported	Opposed
Jason Lewis (R)	$404,338	$3,200,222
Angie Craig (DFL)	$181,244	$2,287,501
Paula Overby (I)	$0	$0

== District 3 ==
2016 Minnesota's 3rd congressional district election
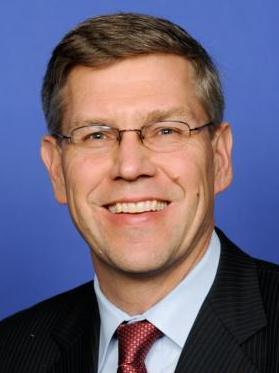

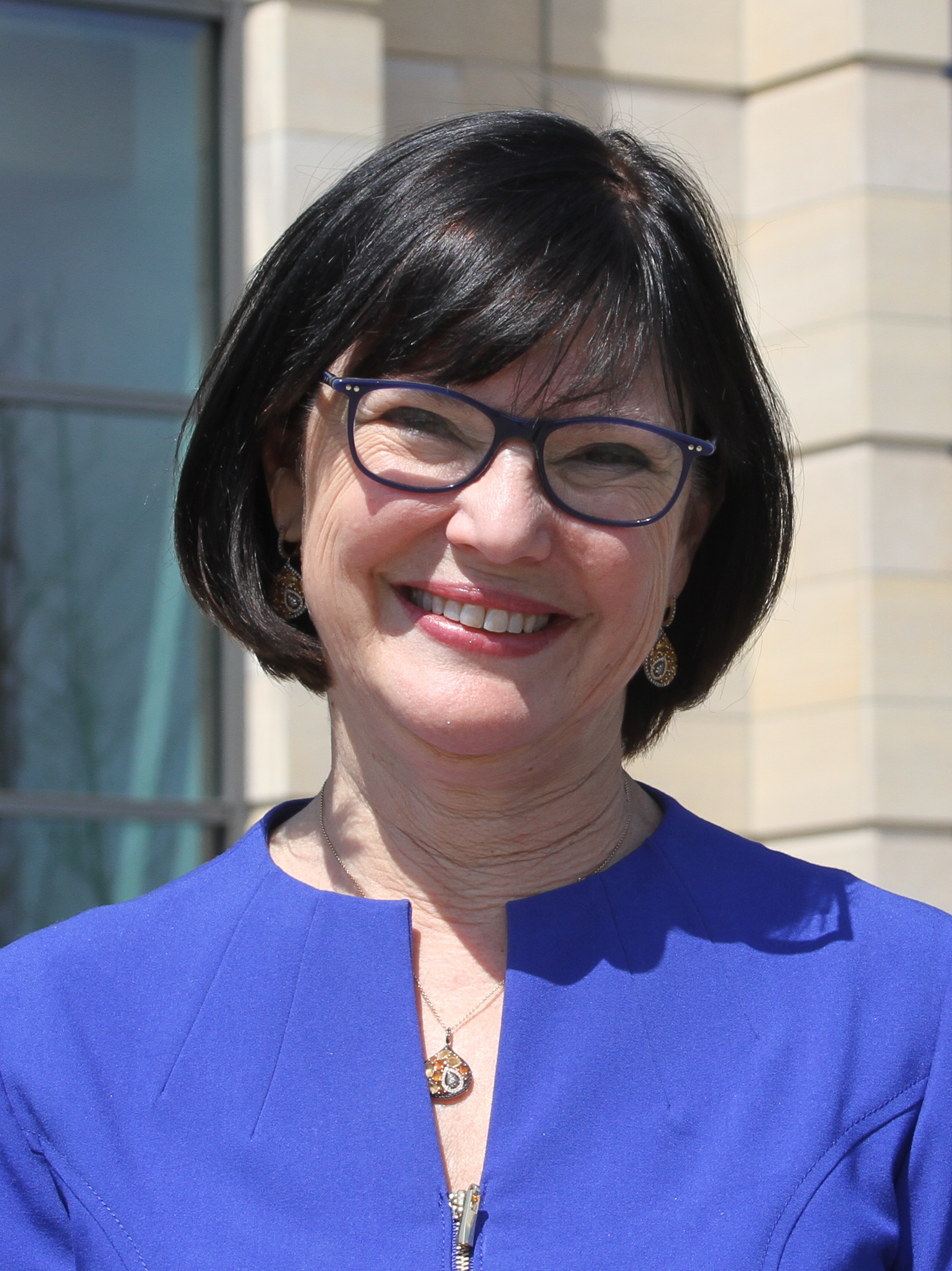
Nominee	Erik Paulsen	Terri Bonoff
Party	Republican	Democratic (DFL)
Popular vote	223,077	169,243
Percentage	56.7%	43.0%
- County results Paulsen: 50–60% 60–70%

- Precinct results Paulsen: 40–50% 50–60% 60–70% 70–80% Bonoff: 40–50% 50–60% 60–70% 70–80% No votes
U.S. Representative before election
Erik Paulsen
Republican
Elected U.S. Representative
Erik Paulsen
Republican

Incumbent Republican Erik Paulsen, who had represented the district since 2009, ran for re-election. He was re-elected with 62% of the vote in 2014. The district had a PVI of R+2.

=== Republican primary ===
==== Candidates ====
===== Nominee =====
- Erik Paulsen, incumbent U.S. Representative

=== Democratic primary ===
==== Candidates ====
===== Nominee =====
- Terri Bonoff, state senator

===== Withdrawn =====
- Jon Tollefson, former U.S. diplomat, lobbyist for the Minnesota Nurses Association and candidate for state representative in 2014

=== General election ===
==== Endorsements ====
Terri Bonoff (DFL)

U.S. Presidents

- Barack Obama, President of the United States

Labor unions

- American Federation of State, County and Municipal Employees
- International Association of Sheet Metal, Air, Rail and Transportation Workers

Organizations

- Democratic Congressional Campaign Committee "Red to Blue" Program
- EMILY's List

==== Debates ====
- Complete video of debate, October 30, 2016

==== Polling ====
Poll source	Date(s) administered	Sample size	Margin of error	Erik Paulsen (R)	Terri Bonoff (DFL)	Undecided
SurveyUSA	October 10–13, 2016	579	± 4.2%	49%	38%	13%
Clarity Campaign Lab (D-House Majority PAC)	September 11–13, 2016	353	± 4.34%	45%	42%	13%
DCCC (D)	September 12, 2016	353	± 5.2%	38%	40%	22%
Newton Heath LLC (R-AAN)	August 9–11, 2016	402	± 4.9%	57%	31%	12%
Victoria Research & Consulting (D-Bonoff)	June 27–30, 2016	400	± 4.9%	45%	45%	10%

==== Predictions ====
Source	Ranking	As of
The Cook Political Report	Lean R	November 7, 2016
Daily Kos Elections	Lean R	November 7, 2016
Rothenberg	Likely R	November 3, 2016
Sabato's Crystal Ball	Lean R	November 7, 2016
RCP	Lean R	October 31, 2016

==== Results ====
Minnesota's 3rd congressional district, 2016
Party	Candidate	Votes	%
Republican	Erik Paulsen (incumbent)	223,077	56.7
Democratic (DFL)	Terri Bonoff	169,243	43.0
Write-in		1,144	0.3
Total votes		393,464	100.0
Republican hold			

==== Finances ====
===== Campaigns =====
Candidate (party)	Raised	Spent	Cash on hand
Erik Paulsen (R)	$4,939,819	$5,761,611	$373,169
Terri Bonoff (DFL)	$1,970,869	$1,970,297	$572

===== Outside Spending =====
Candidate (party)	Supported	Opposed
Erik Paulsen (R)	$540,029	$3,392,767
Terri Bonoff (DFL)	$571,546	$1,521,629

== District 4 ==
2016 Minnesota's 4th congressional district election
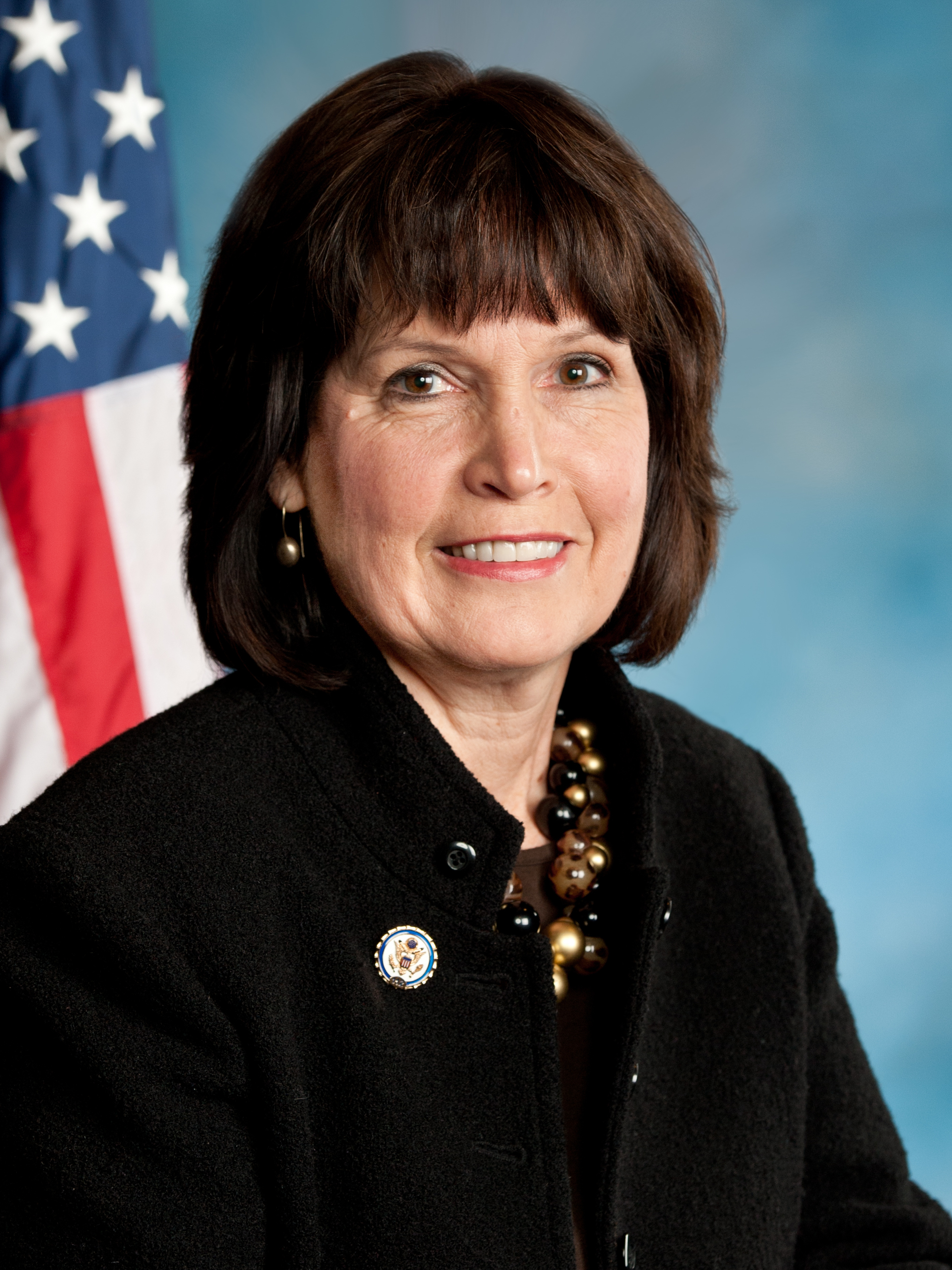

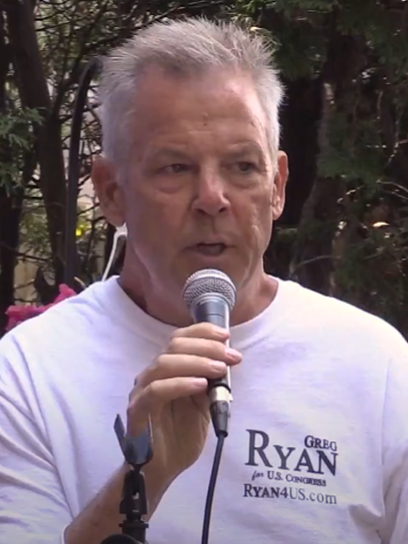

Nominee	Betty McCollum	Greg Ryan	Susan Pendergast Sindt
Party	Democratic (DFL)	Republican	Legal Marijuana Now
Popular vote	203,299	121,032	27,152
Percentage	57.8%	34.4%	7.7%
- County results McCollum: 40–50% 60–70%

- Precinct results McCollum: 40–50% 50–60% 60–70% 70–80% 80–90% Ryan: 40–50% 50–60% 60–70% No votes
U.S. Representative before election
Betty McCollum
Democratic (DFL)
Elected U.S. Representative
Betty McCollum
Democratic (DFL)

Incumbent Democrat Betty McCollum, who had represented the district since 2001, ran for re-election. She was re-elected with 61% of the vote in 2014. The district had a PVI of D+11.

=== Democratic primary ===
==== Candidates ====
===== Nominee =====
- Betty McCollum, incumbent U.S. Representative

===== Eliminated in primary =====
- Steve Carlson, development consultant, attorney, Independence nominee for this seat in 2010 and 2012 and for U.S. Senate in 2014

==== Results ====
Democratic primary election
Party	Candidate	Votes	%
Democratic (DFL)	Betty McCollum (incumbent)	33,336	94.0
Democratic (DFL)	Steve Carlson	2,128	6.0
Total votes		35,464	100.0

=== Republican primary ===
==== Candidates ====
===== Nominee =====
- Greg Ryan, businessman

===== Eliminated in primary =====
- Gene Rechtzigel, farmer and Independent candidate for State Senate, District 53 in 1980
- Nikolay Nikolayevich Bey, airport cleaning company supervisor

==== Results ====
Republican primary results
Party	Candidate	Votes	%
Republican	Greg Ryan	5,618	82.0
Republican	Gene Rechtzigel	845	12.3
Republican	Nikolay Nikolayevich Bey	390	5.7
Total votes		6,853	100.0

=== Legal Marijuana Now primary ===
==== Candidates ====
===== Nominee =====
- Susan Pendergast Sindt, business owner

=== General election ===
==== Endorsements ====
Betty McCollum (DFL)

Labor unions

- AFL-CIO
- American Federation of State, County and Municipal Employees
- International Association of Sheet Metal, Air, Rail and Transportation Workers

==== Predictions ====
Source	Ranking	As of
The Cook Political Report	Safe D	November 7, 2016
Daily Kos Elections	Safe D	November 7, 2016
Rothenberg	Safe D	November 3, 2016
Sabato's Crystal Ball	Safe D	November 7, 2016
RCP	Safe D	October 31, 2016

==== Results ====
Minnesota's 4th congressional district, 2016
Party	Candidate	Votes	%
Democratic (DFL)	Betty McCollum (incumbent)	203,299	57.8
Republican	Greg Ryan	121,032	34.4
Legal Marijuana Now	Susan Pendergast Sindt	27,152	7.7
Write-in		461	0.1
Total votes		351,944	100.0
Democratic (DFL) hold			

==== Finances ====
===== Campaigns =====
Candidate (party)	Raised	Spent	Cash on hand
Betty McCollum (DFL)	$915,558	$962,049	$124,672
Greg Ryan (R)	$51,293	$48,298	$2,996
Susan Sindt (LM)	Unreported		

===== Outside Spending =====
Candidate (party)	Supported	Opposed
Betty McCollum (DFL)	$3,679	$0
Greg Ryan (R)	$0	$0
Susan Sindt (LM)	$0	$0

== District 5 ==
2016 Minnesota's 5th congressional district election
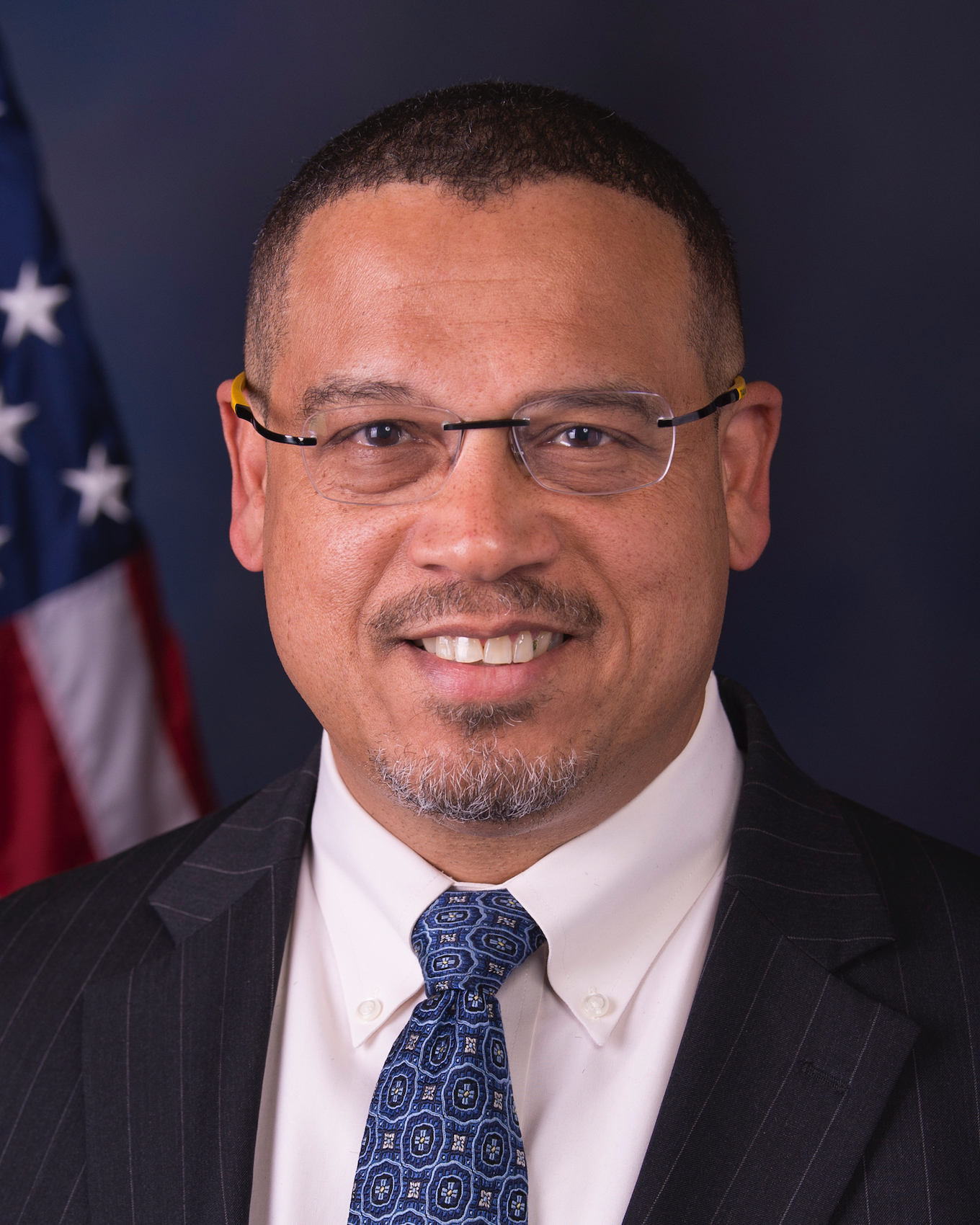

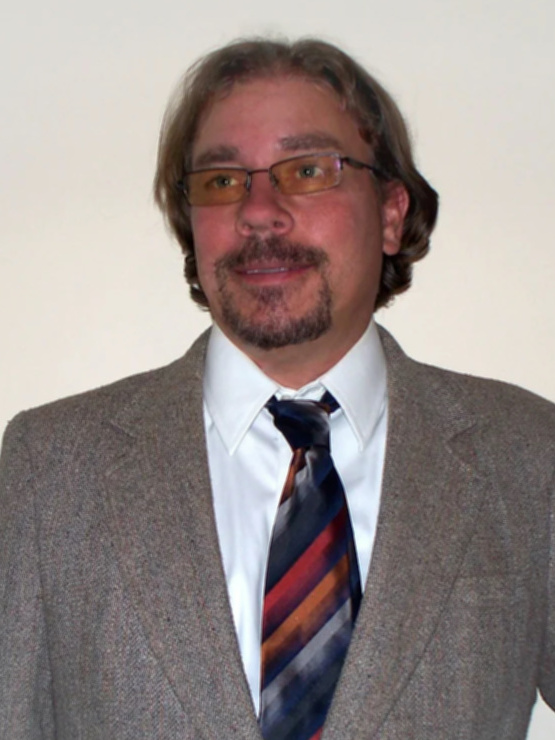
Nominee	Keith Ellison	Frank Nelson Drake	Dennis Schuller
Party	Democratic (DFL)	Republican	Legal Marijuana Now
Popular vote	249,964	80,660	30,759
Percentage	69.1%	22.3%	8.5%
- Precinct results Ellison: 40–50% 50–60% 60–70% 70–80% 80–90% >90% Drake: 40–50% 50–60% No votes
U.S. Representative before election
Keith Ellison
Democratic (DFL)
Elected U.S. Representative
Keith Ellison
Democratic (DFL)

Incumbent Democrat Keith Ellison, who had represented the district since 2007, ran for re-election. He was re-elected with 71% of the vote in 2014. The district had a PVI of D+71.

=== Democratic primary ===
==== Candidates ====
===== Nominee =====
- Keith Ellison, incumbent U.S. Representative

===== Eliminated in primary =====
- Lee Bauer, machinist and Independence nominee for this seat in 2014
- Gregg Iverson, perennial candidate

==== Results ====
Democratic primary results
Party	Candidate	Votes	%
Democratic (DFL)	Keith Ellison (incumbent)	40,380	91.7
Democratic (DFL)	Gregg Iverson	1,887	4.3
Democratic (DFL)	Lee Bauer	1,757	4.0
Total votes		44,024	100.0

=== Republican primary ===
==== Candidates ====
===== Nominee =====
- Frank Nelson Drake, real estate investor

==== Results ====
Republican primary results
Party	Candidate	Votes	%
Republican	Frank Nelson Drake	4,177	100.0
Total votes		4,177	100.0

=== Legal Marijuana Now primary ===
==== Candidates ====
===== Nominee =====
- Dennis Schuller, media and event producer

=== General election ===
==== Endorsements ====
Keith Ellison (DFL)

Labor unions

- AFL-CIO
- American Federation of State, County and Municipal Employees
- International Association of Sheet Metal, Air, Rail and Transportation Workers

==== Predictions ====
Source	Ranking	As of
The Cook Political Report	Safe D	November 7, 2016
Daily Kos Elections	Safe D	November 7, 2016
Rothenberg	Safe D	November 3, 2016
Sabato's Crystal Ball	Safe D	November 7, 2016
RCP	Safe D	October 31, 2016

==== Results ====
Minnesota's 5th congressional district, 2016
Party	Candidate	Votes	%
Democratic (DFL)	Keith Ellison (incumbent)	249,964	69.1
Republican	Frank Drake	80,660	22.3
Legal Marijuana Now	Dennis Schuller	30,759	8.5
Write-in		499	0.1
Total votes		361,875	100.0
Democratic (DFL) hold			

==== Finances ====
===== Campaigns =====
Candidate (party)	Raised	Spent	Cash on hand
Keith Ellison (DFL)	$2,784,931	$2,457,969	$489,709
Frank Drake (R)	Unreported		
Dennis Schuller (LM)	Unreported		

===== Outside Spending =====
Candidate (party)	Supported	Opposed
Keith Ellison (DFL)	$28	$0
Frank Drake (R)	$42	$0
Dennis Schuller (LM)	$0	$0

== District 6 ==
2016 Minnesota's 6th congressional district election
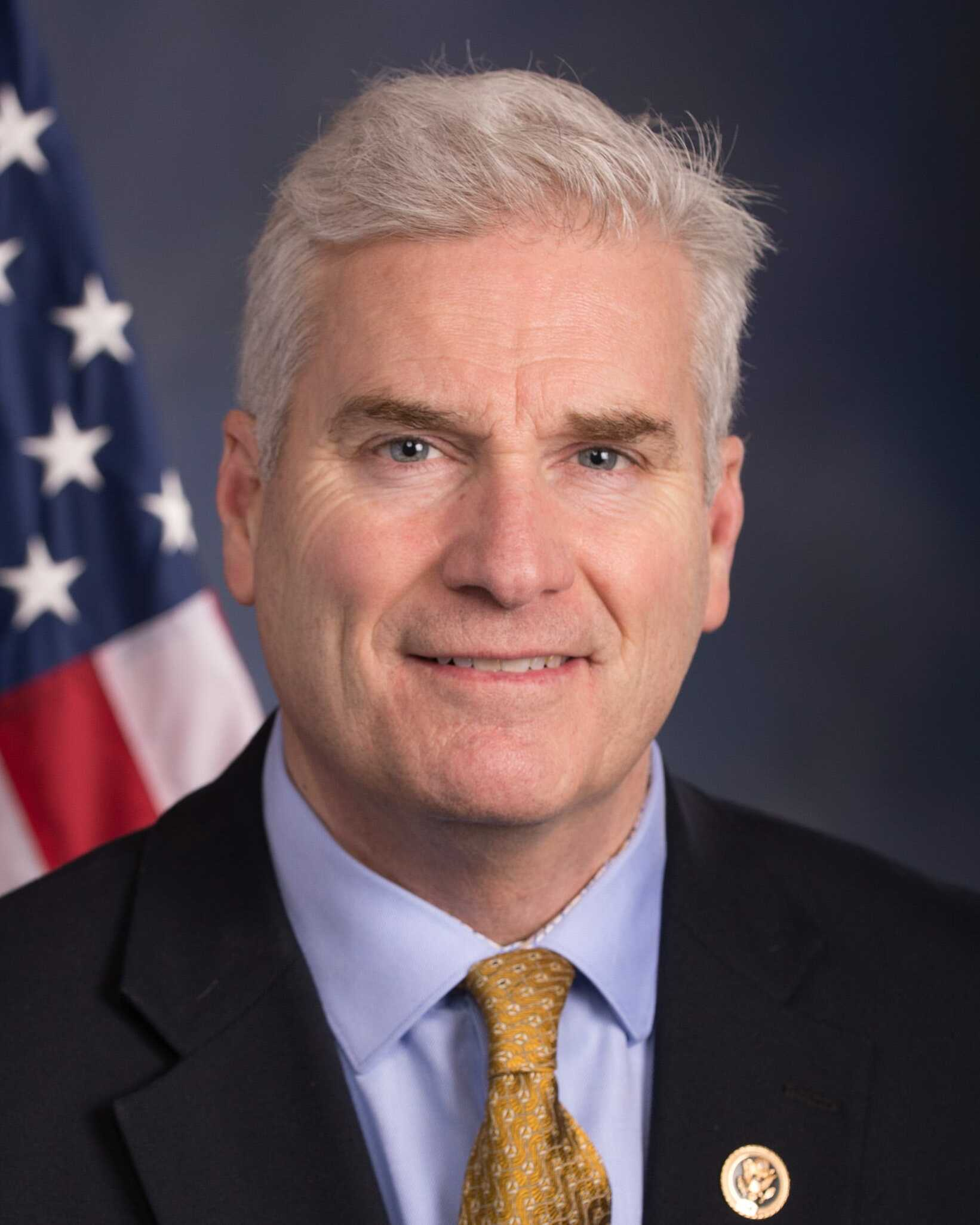

Nominee	Tom Emmer	David Snyder
Party	Republican	Democratic (DFL)
Popular vote	235,380	123,008
Percentage	65.6%	34.3%
- County results Emmer: 60–70% 70–80%

- Precinct results Emmer: 50–60% 60–70% 70–80% 80–90% >90% Snyder: 40–50% 50–60% 60–70% >90% No votes
U.S. Representative before election
Tom Emmer
Republican
Elected U.S. Representative
Tom Emmer
Republican

Incumbent Republican Tom Emmer, who had represented the district since 2015, ran for re-election. He was elected with 56% of the vote in 2014. The district had a PVI of R+10.

=== Republican primary ===
==== Candidates ====
===== Nominee =====
- Tom Emmer, incumbent U.S. Representative

===== Eliminated in primary =====
- A.J. Kern, small business owner and volunteer columnist for the St. Cloud Times
- Patrick Munro, business owner and candidate for U.S. Senate in 2014

==== Campaign ====
Emmer was challenged from the right by AJ Kern, who criticized his positions on immigration, education and trade. Particularly his vote for Every Student Succeeds Act and his support for the Trans-Pacific Partnership. She also objected to Muslims serving in elected office.

==== Endorsements ====
Tom Emmer

Organizations

- NRA Political Victory Fund

==== Results ====
Republican primary results
Party	Candidate	Votes	%
Republican	Tom Emmer (incumbent)	13,590	68.7
Republican	A. J. Kern	5,219	26.4
Republican	Patrick Munro	962	4.9
Total votes		19,771	100.0

=== Democratic primary ===
==== Candidates ====
===== Nominee =====
- David Snyder, Army veteran

===== Eliminated in primary =====
- Judy Adams, environmental activist and candidate for this seat in 2014
- Bob Helland, business process analyst and Independence nominee for secretary of state in 2014

==== Results ====
Democratic primary results
Party	Candidate	Votes	%
Democratic (DFL)	David Snyder	4,402	46.0
Democratic (DFL)	Judy Adams	3,569	37.3
Democratic (DFL)	Bob Helland	1,595	16.7
Total votes		9,566	100.0

=== General election ===
==== Endorsements ====
David Snyder (DFL)

Labor unions

- AFL-CIO
- American Federation of State, County and Municipal Employees
- International Association of Sheet Metal, Air, Rail and Transportation Workers

==== Predictions ====
Source	Ranking	As of
The Cook Political Report	Safe R	November 7, 2016
Daily Kos Elections	Safe R	November 7, 2016
Rothenberg	Safe R	November 3, 2016
Sabato's Crystal Ball	Safe R	November 7, 2016
RCP	Safe R	October 31, 2016

==== Results ====
Minnesota's 6th congressional district election, 2016
Party	Candidate	Votes	%
Republican	Tom Emmer (incumbent)	235,380	65.6
Democratic (DFL)	David Snyder	123,008	34.3
Write-in		536	0.1
Total votes		358,924	100.0
Republican hold			

==== Finances ====
===== Campaigns =====
Candidate (party)	Raised	Spent	Cash on hand
Tom Emmer (R)	$1,837,927	$1,718,560	$137,565
David Snyder (DFL)	Unreported		

===== Outside Spending =====
Candidate (party)	Supported	Opposed
Tom Emmer (R)	$4,637	$0
David Snyder (DFL)	$0	$0

== District 7 ==
2016 Minnesota's 7th congressional district election
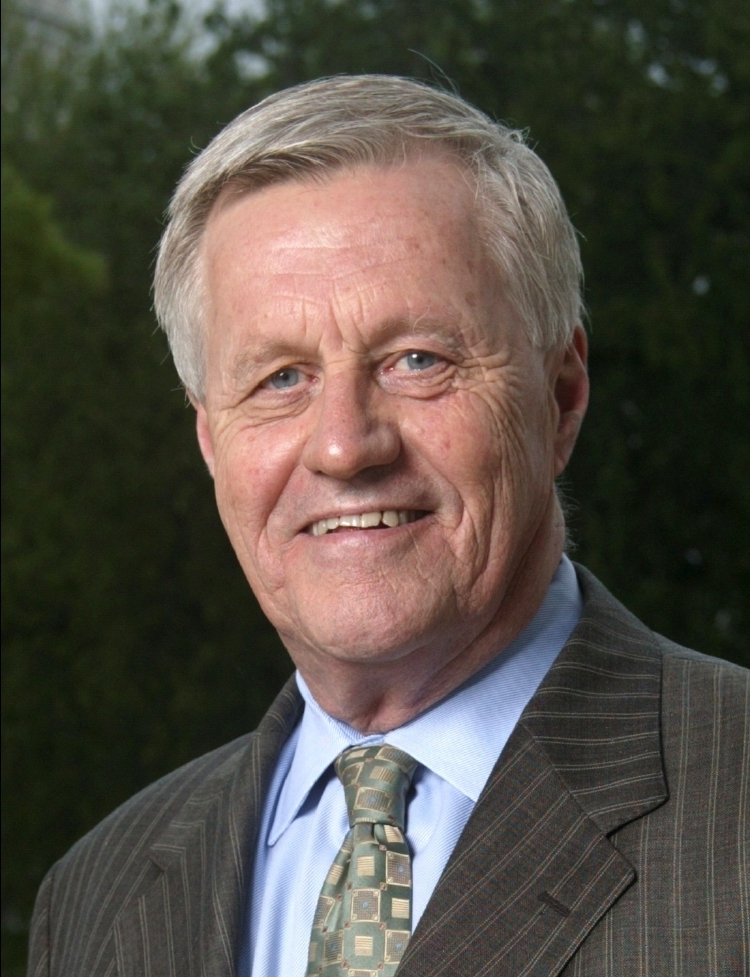

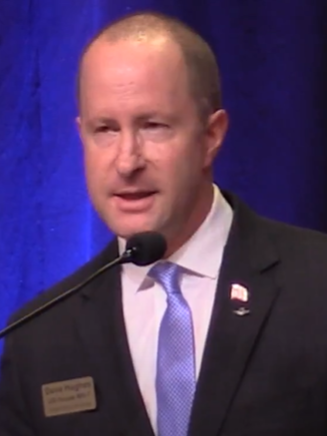
Nominee	Collin Peterson	David Hughes
Party	Democratic (DFL)	Republican
Popular vote	173,589	156,952
Percentage	52.5%	47.4%
- Peterson: 50–60% 60–70% 70–80% 80–90% >90% Hughes: 50–60% 60–70% 70–80% 80–90% >90% Tie: 40–50% 50% No votes
U.S. Representative before election
Collin Peterson
Democratic (DFL)
Elected U.S. Representative
Collin Peterson
Democratic (DFL)

Incumbent Democrat Collin Peterson, who had represented the district since 1991, ran for re-election. He was re-elected with 54% of the vote in 2014. The district had a PVI of R+6.

=== Democratic primary ===
==== Candidates ====
===== Nominee =====
- Collin Peterson, incumbent U.S. Representative

==== Results ====
Democratic primary results
Party	Candidate	Votes	%
Democratic (DFL)	Collin Peterson (incumbent)	16,253	100.0
Total votes		16,253	100.0

=== Republican primary ===
==== Candidates ====
===== Nominee =====
- Dave Hughes, U.S. Air Force veteran

===== Eliminated in primary =====
- Amanda Lynn Hinson, entrepreneur, writer, and former pastor

==== Results ====
Republican primary results
Party	Candidate	Votes	%
Republican	Dave Hughes	8,769	59.0
Republican	Amanda Lynn Hinson	6,104	41.0
Total votes		14,873	100.0

=== Independence primary ===
==== Candidates ====
===== Withdrawn =====
- Kevin Winge, former nonprofit corporation leader

=== General election ===
==== Endorsements ====
Collin Peterson (DFL)

Labor unions

- AFL-CIO
- American Federation of State, County and Municipal Employees
- International Association of Sheet Metal, Air, Rail and Transportation Workers

==== Predictions ====
Source	Ranking	As of
The Cook Political Report	Safe D	November 7, 2016
Daily Kos Elections	Safe D	November 7, 2016
Rothenberg	Safe D	November 3, 2016
Sabato's Crystal Ball	Safe D	November 7, 2016
RCP	Likely D	October 31, 2016

==== Results ====
Minnesota's 7th congressional district, 2016
Party	Candidate	Votes	%
Democratic (DFL)	Collin Peterson (incumbent)	173,589	52.5
Republican	Dave Hughes	156,952	47.4
Write-in		307	0.1
Total votes		330,848	100.0
Democratic (DFL) hold			

==== Finances ====
===== Campaigns =====
Candidate (party)	Raised	Spent	Cash on hand
Collin Peterson (DFL)	$1,201,913	$682,928	$569,667
Dave Hughes (R)	$19,836	$19,564	$272

===== Outside Spending =====
Candidate (party)	Supported	Opposed
Collin Peterson (DFL)	$17,500	$0
Dave Hughes (R)	$220	$0

== District 8 ==
2016 Minnesota's 8th congressional district election
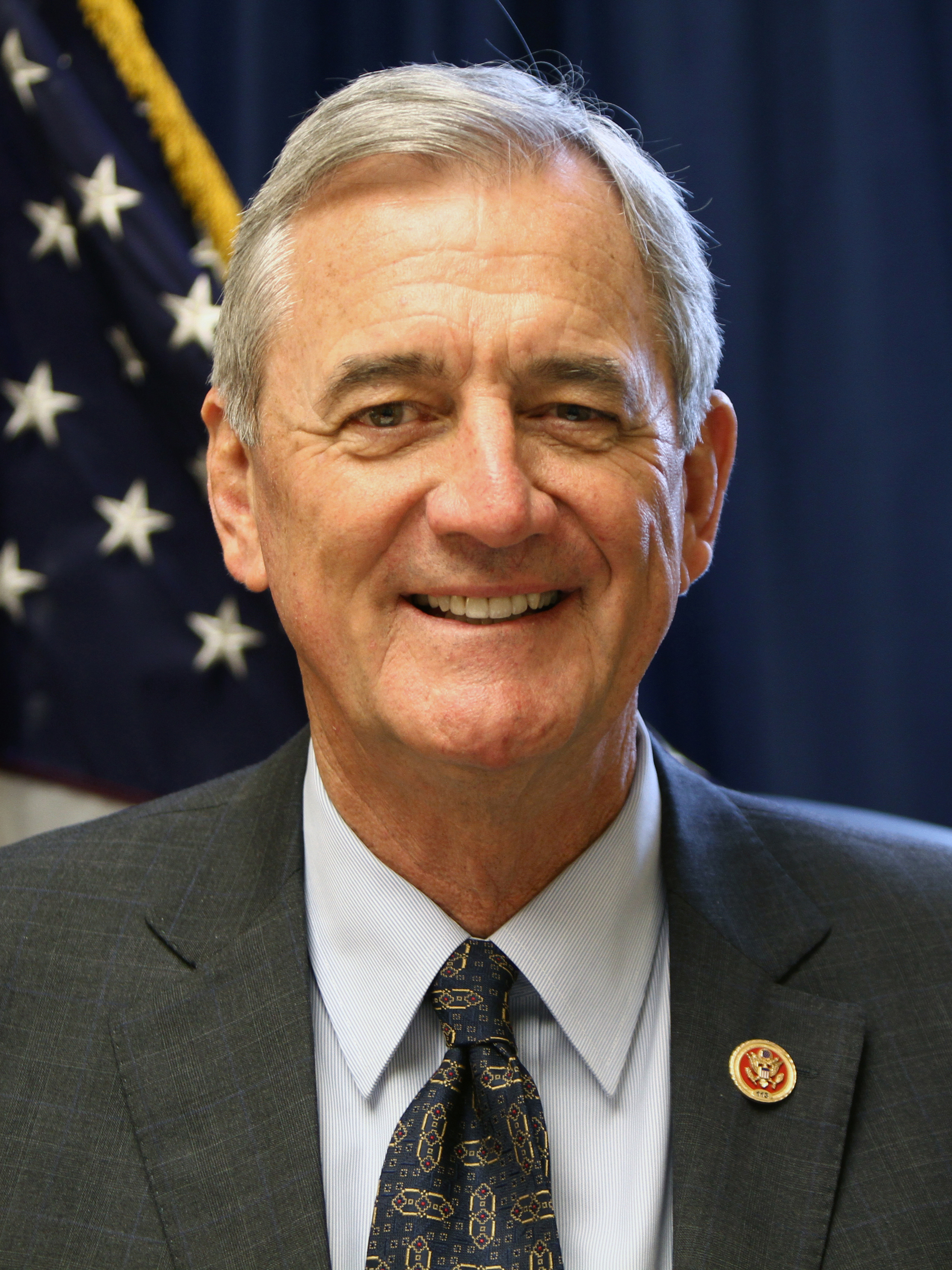

Nominee	Rick Nolan	Stewart Mills III
Party	Democratic (DFL)	Republican
Popular vote	179,098	177,089
Percentage	50.2%	49.6%
- Nolan: 40–50% 50–60% 60–70% 70–80% 80–90% >90% Mills: 40–50% 50–60% 60–70% 70–80% 80–90% >90% Tie: 40–50% 50% No votes
U.S. Representative before election
Rick Nolan
Democratic (DFL)
Elected U.S. Representative
Rick Nolan
Democratic (DFL)

Incumbent Democrat Rick Nolan, who had represented the district since 2013, ran for re-election. He was re-elected with 49% of the vote in 2014. The district had a PVI of D+1.

=== Democratic primary ===
==== Candidates ====
===== Nominee =====
- Rick Nolan, incumbent U.S. Representative

=== Republican primary ===
==== Candidates ====
===== Nominee =====
- Stewart Mills III, Mills Fleet Farm executive and nominee for this seat in 2014

=== General election ===
==== Endorsements ====
Rick Nolan (DFL)

Labor unions

- AFL-CIO
- American Federation of State, County and Municipal Employees
- International Association of Sheet Metal, Air, Rail and Transportation Workers
Stewart Mills (R)

Organizations

- Minnesota Farm Bureau
- National Federation of Independent Business
- National Republican Congressional Committee "Young Guns" Program

Newspapers

- ECM Newspapers
- St. Paul Pioneer Press

==== Debate ====
2016 Minnesota's 8th congressional district debate
No.	Date	Host	Moderator	Link	Democratic	Republican
Key: P Participant A Absent N Not invited I Invited W Withdrawn						
Key: P Participant A Absent N Not invited I Invited W Withdrawn					Rick Nolan	Stewart Mills
1	Oct. 23, 2016	KSTP-TV	Leah McLean		P	P

==== Polling ====
Poll source	Date(s) administered	Sample size	Margin of error	Rick Nolan (DFL)	Stewart Mills (R)	Undecided
SurveyUSA	October 16–19, 2016	595	± 4.1%	41%	45%	14%
Clarity Campaign Labs (D–House Majority PAC)	October 10–11, 2016	514	± 4.3%	49%	41%	10%
Tarrance Group (R–NRCC/Mills for Congress)	March 28–30, 2016	422	± 5.0%	49%	46%	5%

==== Predictions ====
Source	Ranking	As of
The Cook Political Report	Tossup	November 7, 2016
Daily Kos Elections	Tossup	November 7, 2016
Rothenberg	Lean D	November 3, 2016
Sabato's Crystal Ball	Lean D	November 7, 2016
RCP	Tossup D	October 31, 2016

==== Results ====
Though Nolan's margin of victory (2,009 votes) was too large to trigger a publicly funded automatic recount, Mills, as of late November 2016, said that he planned to request and pay for a hand recount of all votes cast in the eighth district, as is his right under law. Mills planned to cover the cost of the recount—just over $100,000— himself. According to the Minneapolis Star Tribune, Minnesota had not seen a recount in a race for the House of Representatives since 2000, when election day totals in Minnesota's 2nd congressional district fell within the half percentage point threshold, thus triggering a state-funded recount. It is not known if Mills's request for a privately funded recount has precedent in Minnesota's electoral history, at least as it pertains to elections for the House of Representatives.

Minnesota's 8th congressional district, 2016
Party	Candidate	Votes	%
Democratic (DFL)	Rick Nolan (incumbent)	179,098	50.2
Republican	Stewart Mills III	177,089	49.6
Write-in		792	0.2
Total votes		356,979	100.0
Democratic (DFL) hold			

==== Finances ====
===== Campaigns =====
Candidate (party)	Raised	Spent	Cash on hand
Rick Nolan (DFL)	$3,029,107	$2,874,695	$181,075
Stewart Mills III (R)	$3,578,385	$3,577,291	$1,392

===== Outside Spending =====
Candidate (party)	Supported	Opposed
Rick Nolan (DFL)	$1,846,754	$7,184,541
Stewart Mills III (R)	$147,906	$6,316,449
