= Rhonda Sivarajah =

American politician

Anoka County Administrator
- Incumbent
- Assumed office June 2019

Member of the Anoka County Board of Commissioners
- In office January 2003 – June 2019

Personal details
- Born: Cambridge, Minnesota
- Party: Republican
- Spouse: Ran Sivarajah
- Children: Sonjay and Asha Sivarajah
- Education: Saint Cloud State University
- Website: www.ElectRhonda.com

Rhonda Sivarajah (born in Cambridge, Minnesota) is a Minnesota politician, Anoka County Commissioner, former candidate for Lieutenant Governor and former candidate for Minnesota's Sixth District Congressional seat.

Sivarajah received a degree in international relations from St. Cloud State University. She worked in the human services division of Anoka County before running for office. She resides in Lino Lakes, along with her husband, Ran, and two children, Sonjay and Asha. She is a former small business owner.

In 2002, Sivarajah was elected to the Anoka County Commission, representing the 6th district. In 2011 she was first elected the Anoka County Board Chair and has been re-elected as chair by her peers each year since then.

When Sivarajah was elected to the Anoka County Board she initially was the sole conservative. Over the years she has been called "a darling of the local conservative blogs", according to the Star-Tribune.
