= School of Environmental Studies, Minnesota =

School in Apple Valley, Minnesota

Coordinates: 44°46′20″N 93°11′27″W

School of Environmental Studies

Location
- 12155 Johnny Cake Ridge Rd. Apple Valley, Minnesota 55124; United States

Information
- Type: Public
- Motto: A community of leaders engaging with others to create a sustainable world.
- Established: 1996
- School district: Independent School District 196
- Principal: Lauren Haistings
- Staff: 19.66 (FTE)
- Enrollment: 359 (2018–19)
- Student to teacher ratio: 18.26
- Mascot: Tiger The Cat
- Colors
- Website: ses.district196.org

The School of Environmental Studies is an optional two-year high school in Apple Valley, Minnesota, United States. Also known as the "Zoo School" or “SES” because of its active partnership with the Minnesota Zoo and its 10-acre (48,000 m^{2}) site on zoo property, the school embraces project-based learning with an environmental theme.

== Eco-history ==
The School of Environmental Studies opened during 1996 in the Twin Cities suburb of Apple Valley as a public, 400-student, 11th and 12th grade "high school of choice". Students from Independent School District 196's high schools, Eastview High School, Apple Valley High School, Rosemount High School and Eagan High School, can all elect to attend SES. In addition, under Minnesota's open-enrollment option students from the greater Minneapolis-St. Paul area are able to fill available slots on a year-by-year basis.

The school is the product of a collaboration between the state (Minnesota Zoo), the community (City of Apple Valley) and a public school district (ISD 196). Originally named the "Zoo Environmental Learning Center (ZELC)" the design and implementation reflects the work of a diverse group of educators. Teachers, administrators, environmental educators, architects and researchers all contributed to the initial discussions and final design of the school.

Since it is located on the grounds of the Minnesota Zoo, a number of students work with zookeepers and scientific staff in studying animal behavior, keeping animals active and challenged, and promoting public transit to the zoo. Other partners who work actively with students to bring real-world experiences to the academic content include the Minnesota DNR, Dakota County GIS and Parks departments, the City of Eagan Parks department, and the City of Apple Valley.

The school's two-year program culminates with a series of senior capstone activities. As a rite of passage this program requires the students to initiate sustainable service experiences, proclaim their evolving environmental ethic, and present an environment issue of choice at a forum attended by the general public, family, and significant individuals in the student's life. Another innovation championed by this program includes their annual "adventure learning activity "Eco-Challenge" conducted at nearby Lebanon Hills Regional Park located in Dakota County, Minnesota. It was conceived by earth science teacher Steve Meyer as the focus of his University of Wisconsin–Stevens Point Master's Thesis on team-based mentoring.

== Design ==
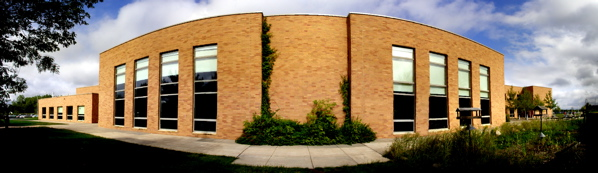
the SES building

The School of Environmental Studies was designed in a manner very different from most schools. The committee charged with planning SES conducted almost two years of research before commissioning an architect. What emerged was a clear vision of the kinds of learning experiences they hoped to provide: interdisciplinary, project-based, and real-world.

Architect Bruce Jilk was commissioned to design the school and given strict budgetary parameters: the per-pupil costs to build and operate the school could not exceed those of other high schools in the district. The result: a 68,000 square foot (6,300 m²) building, completed for $5,420,000, or $80 per square foot ($860/m²).

The central building block of Jilk's design is the student workstation (desk with bulletin board and storage area). This feature simultaneously meets two objectives: that students take on the role of workers (the workstation resembles an office cubicle) and that the learning environment promote a sense of identity (students can decorate workstations to reflect personal tastes).

Individual workstations are clustered in groups of 10, forming a "pod." Ten pods form a "house." The term "house" refers not only to the grouping of 100 students with three teachers but also to their common workspace: a large, flexible-use room (nearly half of one floor) with tables and partitions that can be arranged to accommodate small or large group work.

Architecturally, the "heart" of SES is a forum spanning two floors at the center of the building. Each of the school's four houses faces it and/or the adjacent library. Another example of flexible-use space, the forum serves as cafeteria, display center, gathering place, and auditorium, depending on how tables, chairs, and partitions are configured.

Much of the building's architecture is transparent and serves as a teaching tool. As an example, the exposed ductwork and air distribution systems allows students to construct a better understanding of issues of indoor air quality. Seniors examine the building's airflow during their investigations related to environmental health.

Due to the school's offering of career courses, the building also features a room that caters to animal education, and a room that contains a professional recording studio.

== Classes ==
The school is unique from other high schools in the district in that it offers a different range of classes. The core classes of English, social studies/Human Geography, and environmental science offered at SES are wrapped together in an interdisciplinary learning block of 180 minutes called house. During the balance of the day the school offers elective classes such as art, chemistry, physics, and mentorship. SES offers math classes from Algebra II to Advanced Placement Calculus. SES also has a language program, currently teaching Spanish. SES has a rotating block schedule in that there are two schedules that alternate day to day: Sky and Earth days. This allows students to take four electives, and also experience a class schedule closer to that of most colleges. Career Courses, such as Animal Care and Music Production, are also offered at school. These are a step above elective classes, and are designed for upperclassmen who are searching for a career to look into.

== House ==
House is a daily three-hour-long class where students learn about real topics relating to the environment. For the seniors, it is grounded in literature and composition, human geography, and environmental science, and for juniors, the topics of focus are in Literature and Writing, World History and Biology. There are two senior houses, Green and Gold, and two junior houses, Blue and Rose. Each house hosts independent events such as pot lucks, which create great community building times. These houses contain ten pods that are sectioned off by short walls, and a group area in the center of the pods, called a centrum. These pods consist of around ten students who each have their own desk. Advanced Placement classes are offered in conjunction with many house classes. These optional classes dive more deeply into many of the subjects merely introduced to students not opting for AP coursework .

== Field studies ==
At the end of each trimester the school offers an opportunity for students to participate in field studies. Field studies provide students with the ability to transfer classroom learning into the field. Field studies are student-funded, teacher-led activities lasting between 6 and 12 days in locations around the world. Some studies, such as the Winter Expedition, The American Outback, and the Spring BWCAW, focus on personal growth and wilderness settings. Others examine environments in distant parts of the world such as Alaska, Iceland, Glacier National Park, Scotland, Costa Rica, Belize, France, Spain, Southern California and others. Another type partners with Wilderness Inquiry to provide a more blended experience: New Zealand, Australia, South Africa.

== Senior projects ==
Near the end of each student's tenure at SES, seniors design a project that combines an aspect of the environment that they are passionate about with the community. Examples of senior projects in the past are a Peace Pole planted in the SES garden adorned with writing from languages spoken by citizens of countries SES students have visited. Another example is the wind turbine on SES property that gauges electricity levels and environmental factors.

== See also ==
- Environmental education
- Outdoor education
