= Eastview High School =

Coordinates: 44°44′40″N 93°11′30″W

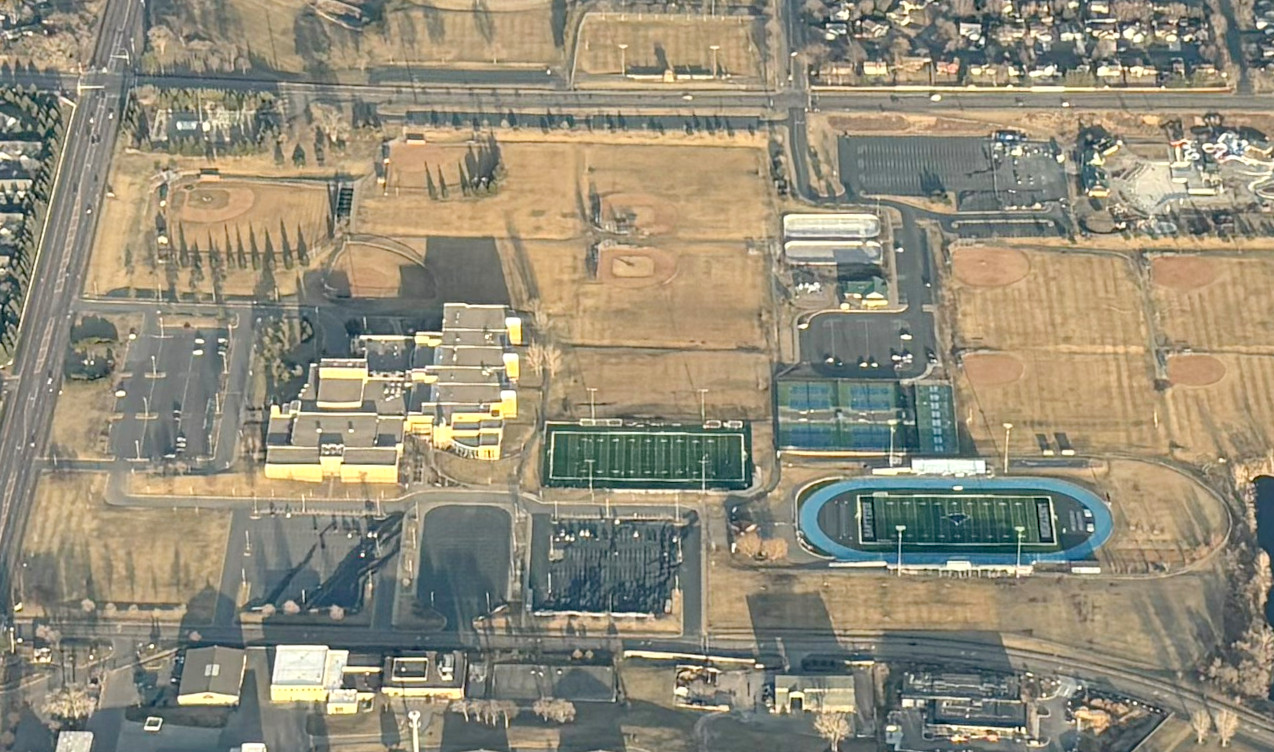

Location
- 6200 140th Street West; Apple Valley, MN; United States

Information
- Type: Public high school
- Established: 1997
- School district: Independent School District 196.
- Principal: Bruce Miller
- Staff: 114.37 (FTE)
- Grades: 9–12
- Enrollment: 2,312 (2023-2024)
- Student to teacher ratio: 20.22
- Colors: Black, Blue, Silver, White
- Mascot: Zapp
- Newspaper: The Lightning Press
- Yearbook: Lightyear
- Announcements Show: The 4Cast
- News Magazine: The Flash
- Website: https://evhs.district196.org/

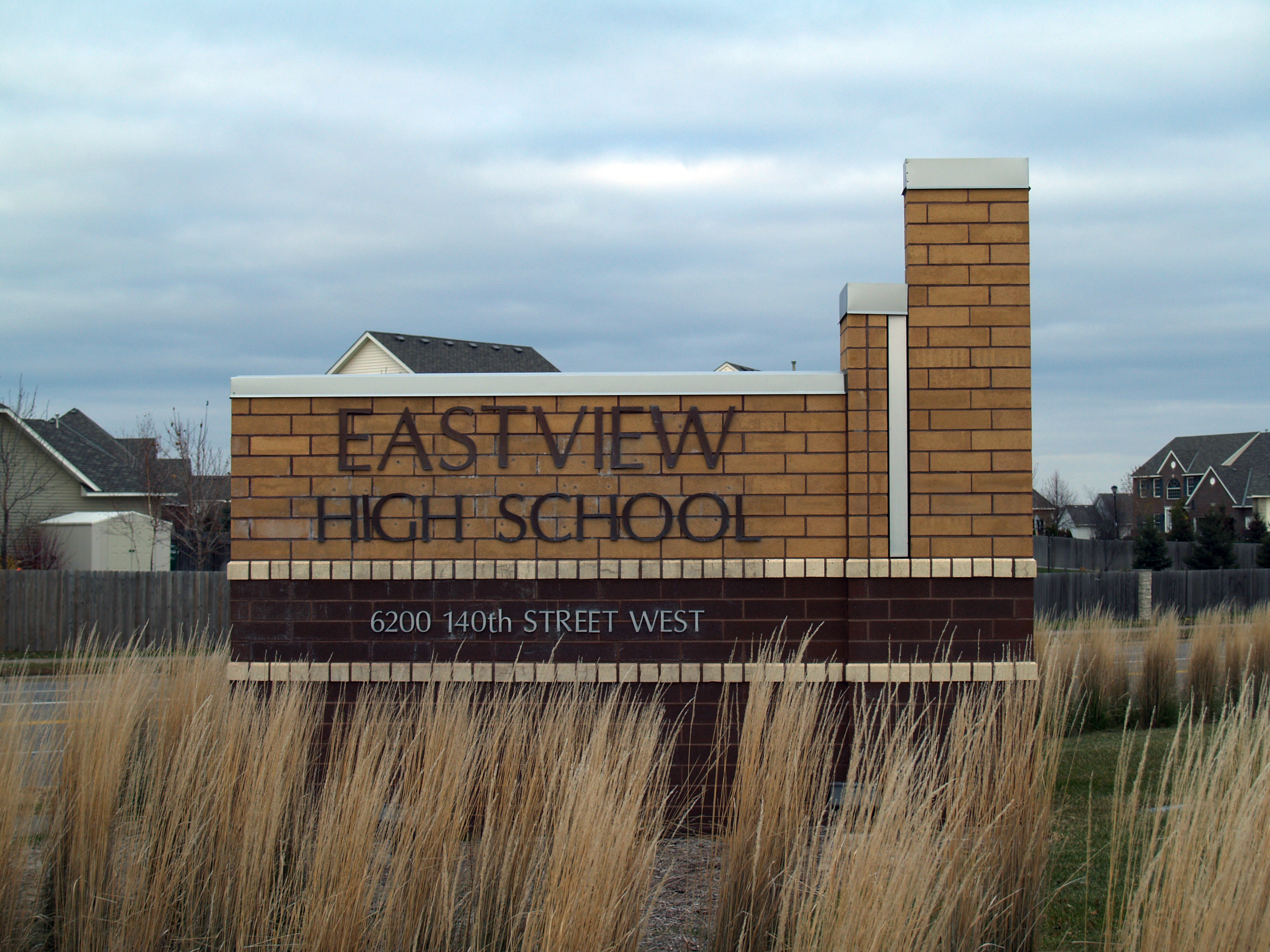
The Eastview High School sign on the corner of Flagstaff Avenue and 140th Street.

Eastview High School is a comprehensive and college preparatory public high school in Apple Valley, Minnesota, United States. Established in 1997, Eastview is the newest of the four high schools serving Independent School District 196. Newsweek ranked the school in their "List of the Top High Schools in America" for the sixth consecutive time (2000, 2002, 2004, and 2006, 2007, 2008). Eastview has also been recognized by U.S. News & World Report as one of America's Best High Schools. In 2013, Eastview was ranked in the top 3% of the most challenging high schools in the United States, as well as a top comprehensive high school in Minnesota. Prior to the 2010–2011 school year, Eastview was a member of the Lake Conference, but then broke off with most of the Lake Conference schools in order to create the South Suburban Conference.

== Feeder schools ==
Students matriculate from three different public middle schools:

- Falcon Ridge Middle school (located in Apple Valley, MN)
- Scott Highlands Middle School (located in Apple Valley, MN)
- Black Hawk Middle School (located in Eagan, MN)

== History ==
Eastview High School, District 196's fourth comprehensive high school, opened on September 2, 1997. Located in Apple Valley, MN, includes a 330,000 square foot facility and 200 acres of recreational facilities. It is home to over 2,000 students in grades 9–12. Eastview uses the quarter system - 10 weeks per quarter. There are four quarters in a full school year. The majority of the courses at Eastview High School are quarter courses. Some courses (School of Environmental Studies at the Minnesota Zoo courses and Career Development courses) will be 12 weeks in length because students from all district high schools will be attending these courses.

== Location and facilities ==
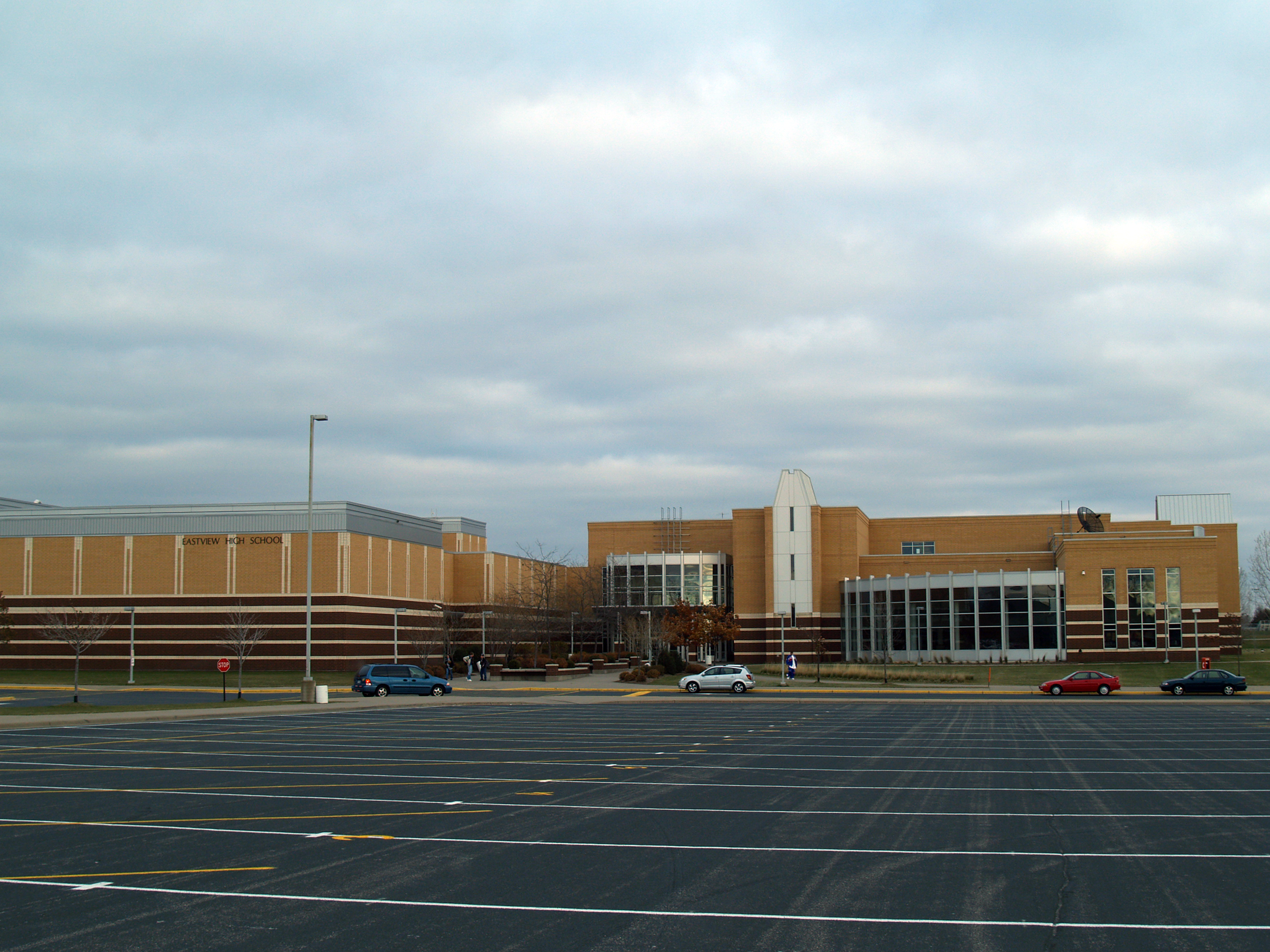
A view of the west doors of Eastview High School.

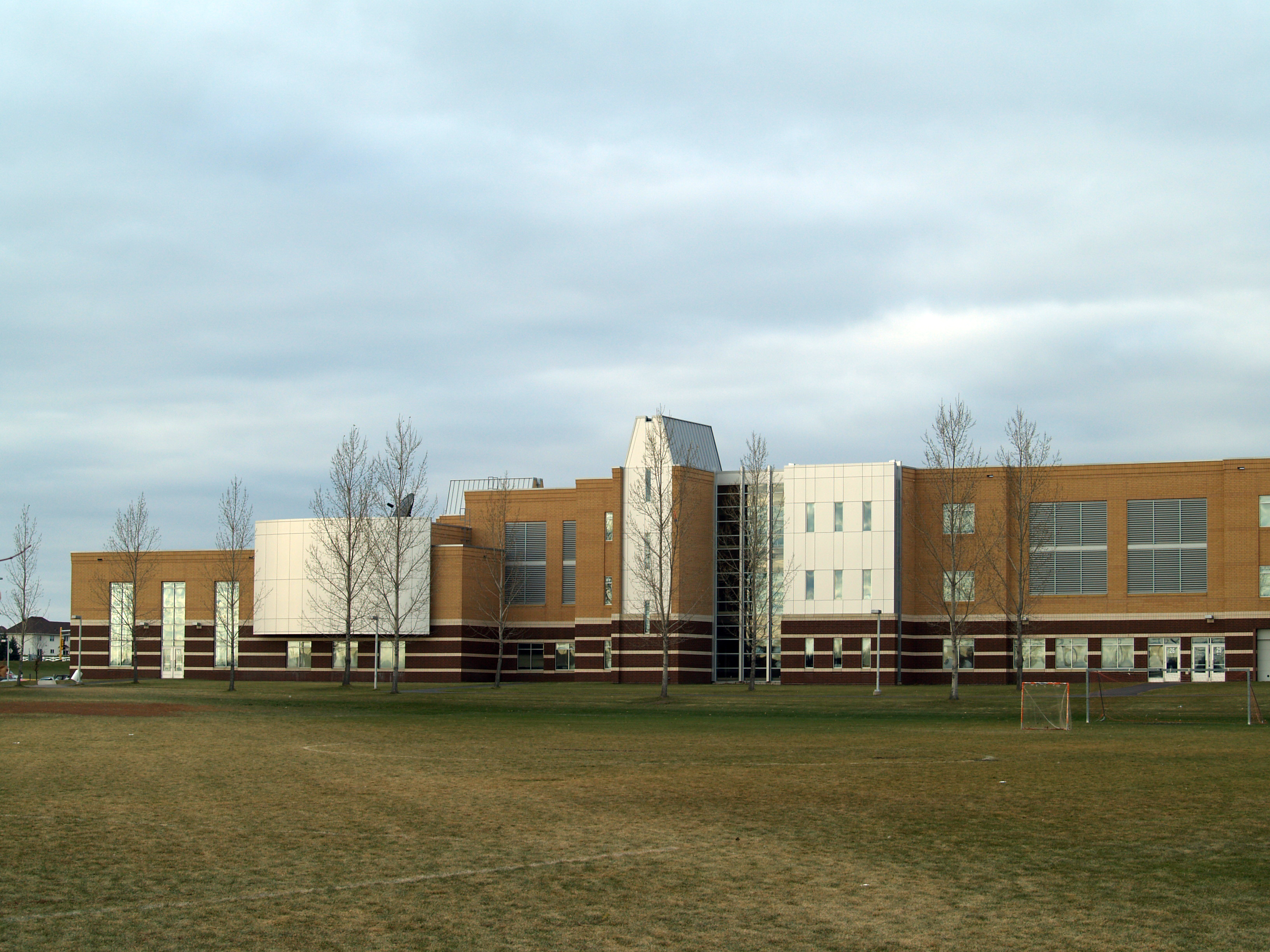
The south side of Eastview High School.

Eastview High School is located in Apple Valley, adjacent to 200 acres (0.81 km^{2}) of playing fields and recreational facilities. The 330,000-square-foot (31,000 m^{2}) facility is built to house 2,000 students in grades 9–12. Eastview High School's students have achieved high honors in academics, athletics, and the arts. Eastview was identified as a ten star school (highest rating) by the Minnesota Department of Education.

== Curriculum ==
Through the Minnesota state Post Secondary Enrollment Options (PSEO) program, students are eligible to take classes at state colleges and some times even universities.

== Athletics ==
Eastview's team name is the Lightning and their mascot is Zapp, an anthropomorphic lightning bolt. In only 13 years of existence, Eastview athletic teams have won 21 state championships, 47 section championships, 44 conference championships, 11 state academic championships, and 30 section academic championships. Students from Eastview join forces with other district schools to form the Dakota Hawks, an adaptive athletic team.

== Notable alumni ==
- Steven Crowl, class of 2020. College basketball player
- Devin Kelley, class of 2004. Actress on The Chicago Code and in the movie Chernobyl Diaries.
- Rhys Lloyd, class of 2001. Former NFL kicker.
- Erin Maye Quade, class of 2004. Former member of the Minnesota House of Representatives
- Ty McDevitt, class of 2011. Head coach for the Minnesota Golden Gophers baseball team.
- Natalie Snodgrass, class of 2017. Professional Women's Hockey League player.
