= Mike Schneider (poker player) =

American poker player (born 1983)

- Nickname: Schneids

World Series of Poker
- Bracelet: None
- Money finishes: 4
- Highest WSOP Main Event finish: None

World Poker Tour
- Title: None
- Final table: None
- Money finish: 1

Mike Schneider (born November 29, 1983) is a professional poker player from Eagan, Minnesota who, at the age of 22, won the "PartyPoker.com Million V" for $1,000,000. He is also a member of Team CardRunners a group of sponsored professional poker players on Full Tilt Poker.

Schneider graduated from Eagan High School in 2002. As a saxophone player, he played in Eagan's Wind Ensemble and Jazz Band. He graduated from the University of Minnesota in December 2006 with a degree in Journalism and Mass Communication.

== Poker career ==
In March 2006, Schneider won the PartyPoker.com Million V Cruise event (limit Texas hold 'em) and the $1,000,000 first prize, defeating Kenna James in the final heads-up confrontation.

In October 2006, Schneider won the first event of the Fall Poker Classic hosted by Canterbury Park. In October 2007, he was the Fall Poker Classic's Player of the Year. In August 2008, Schneider won the "Twin Cities Poker Open" for $81,818. In October 2012, Mike won Canterbury Park's first ever HORSE Event in their annual "Fall Poker Classic" for $9,894 and followed it up by winning the 2012 Fall Poker Classic main event for $63,759. In August 2014, Schneider won the Midwest Poker Classic event at Running Aces for $48,425.

As of 2014, Schneider's live poker tournament winnings exceeded $1,500,000.

Schneider's poker nickname is "Schneids". He is regularly regarded as one of the top LHE players in the world.

Mike Schneider was inducted into the Minnesota Poker Hall of Fame in 2014.
