= Independent School District 196 =

School district in Dakota County, Minnesota

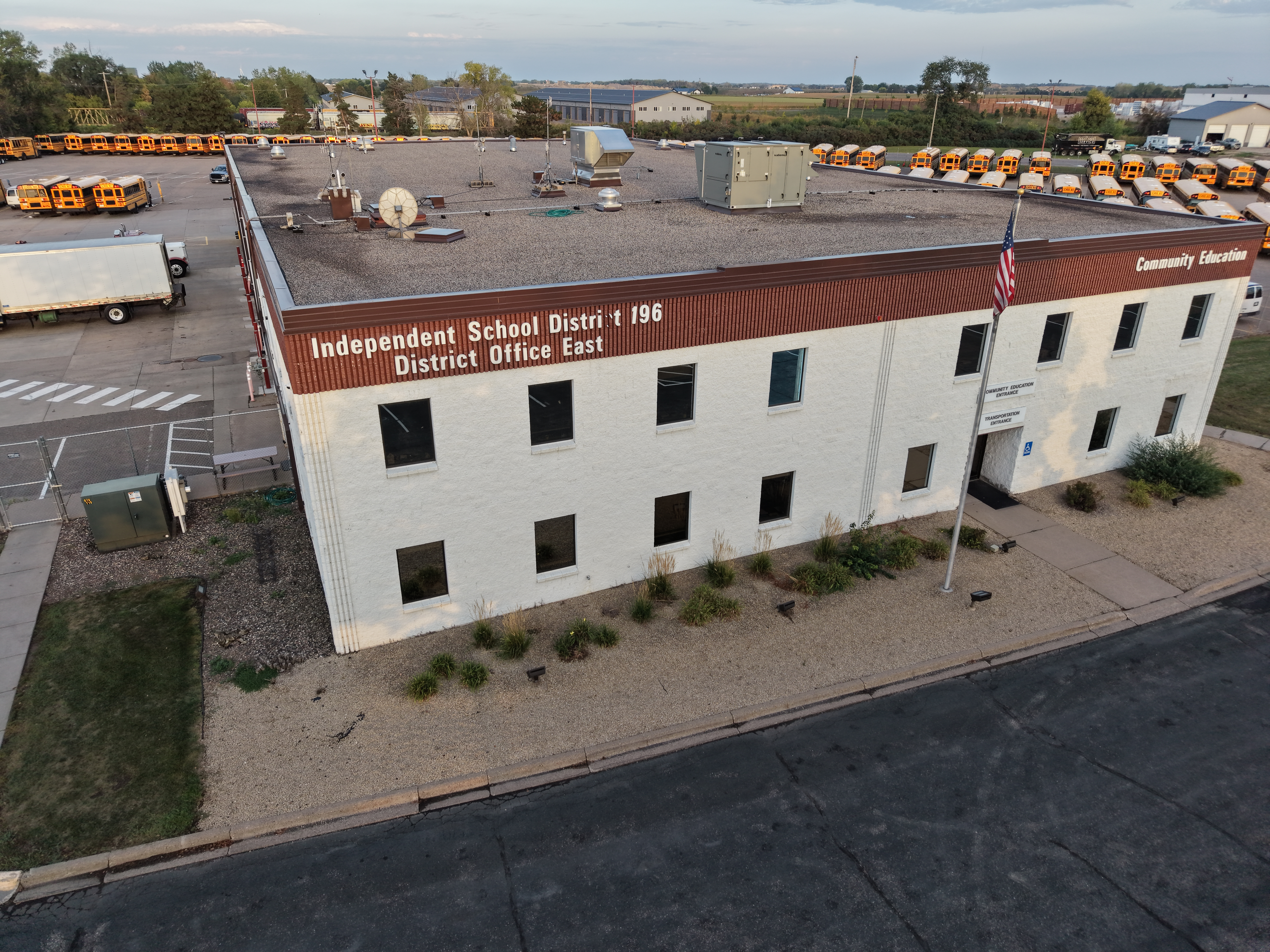

Location
- Dakota County, Minnesota South Metropolitan Twin Cities MN; USA

District information
- Type: Public
- Motto: Educating, Developing, and inspiring our students for lifelong success
- Grades: K-12
- Established: 1858
- Superintendent: Michael Bolsoni
- Budget: $500,000,000+

Students and staff
- Students: 27,679
- Teachers: 2100
- Staff: 4000
- Athletic conference: South Suburban Conference

Other information
- Website: www.district196.org

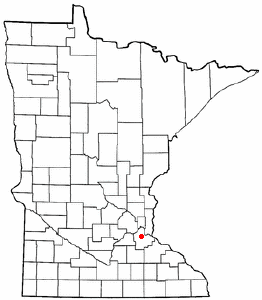
Location of Rosemount within Minnesota

Location of Minnesota within the United States

Independent School District 196 is a K-12 public school district located in the south suburban Twin Cities, near both Minneapolis and St. Paul in Minnesota.

Also known as the Rosemount-Apple Valley-Eagan School District, District 196 serves approximately 28,300 students in grades Early Childhood-12 and is Minnesota's fourth largest school district. The 110-square-mile (280 km^{2}) district boundary includes all or part of eight cities - Rosemount, Apple Valley, Eagan, Burnsville, Coates, Inver Grove Heights, Lakeville, Empire - and rural Vermillion township.

District 196 has 20 elementary schools (grades k-5), six middle schools including Scott Highlands Middle School (grades 6-8), and four high schools (grades 9-12), the School of Environmental Studies optional high school (grades 11-12), the Area Learning Center alternative high school (grades 9-12) and Dakota Ridge special education school (grades k-12). and (transition plus) post secondary for students with special needs) (School attendance boundary maps and address search)

The district has been honored with six National Blue Ribbon Schools of Excellence awards and numerous state and nationally recognized programs in academics, the arts and athletics.

District 196 is consistently recognized among the nation's top school districts.

== District 196 High Schools ==
All five District 196 high schools compete in the South Suburban Conference of the Minnesota State High School League.

- Apple Valley (Eagles)
- Eagan (Wildcats)
- Eastview (Lightning)
- Rosemount (Irish)
- School of Environmental Studies (Dolphins)

== District 196 Middle Schools ==
- Black Hawk Middle School
- Dakota Hills Middle School
- Falcon Ridge Middle School
- Rosemount Middle School
- Scott Highlands Middle School
- Valley Middle School of STEM

== District 196 Elementary Schools ==
=== Apple Valley, MN ===
- Cedar Park Elementary STEM School
- Diamond Path Elementary School of International Studies
- Greenleaf Elementary School
- Highland Elementary School
- Southview Elementary School
- Westview Elementary School

=== Burnsville, MN ===
- Echo Park Elementary - School of Leadership, Engineering and Technology

=== Eagan, MN ===
- Deerwood Elementary School
- Glacier Hills Elementary - School of Arts and Science
- Oak Ridge Elementary - School of Leadership, Environmental and Health Sciences
- Pinewood Community School
- Red Pine Elementary School
- Thomas Lake Elementary School
- Woodland Elementary School
- Northview Elementary School

=== Rosemount, MN ===
- Rosemount Elementary School
- Shannon Park Elementary School
- Emerald Trail Elementary School

=== Lakeville, MN ===
- East Lake Elementary School
- Parkview Elementary School

== District 196 Demographics (Revised annually) ==
- Total population – 145,796
- Total households – 51,181
- 60 percent with pre-school and school-age children
- Nearly one-third of all district residents are under the age of 18

== 2025 school shooting threats ==
On December 17, 2025, an unknown Instagram account posted a poll mentioning 4 schools, asking “which one first”, and a video with guns threatening to “shoot up” Apple Valley High school, or Eastview High School. The schools featured in the poll were Apple Valley High School, Eastview High School, Rosemount High School, and Burnsvile High School. District 196 closed multiple high schools, and police arrested a 16 year old boy, who said that he was involved in the situation.

== See also ==
- List of school districts in Minnesota
