= Minnesota Zoo =

Zoo in Apple Valley, Minnesota, USA

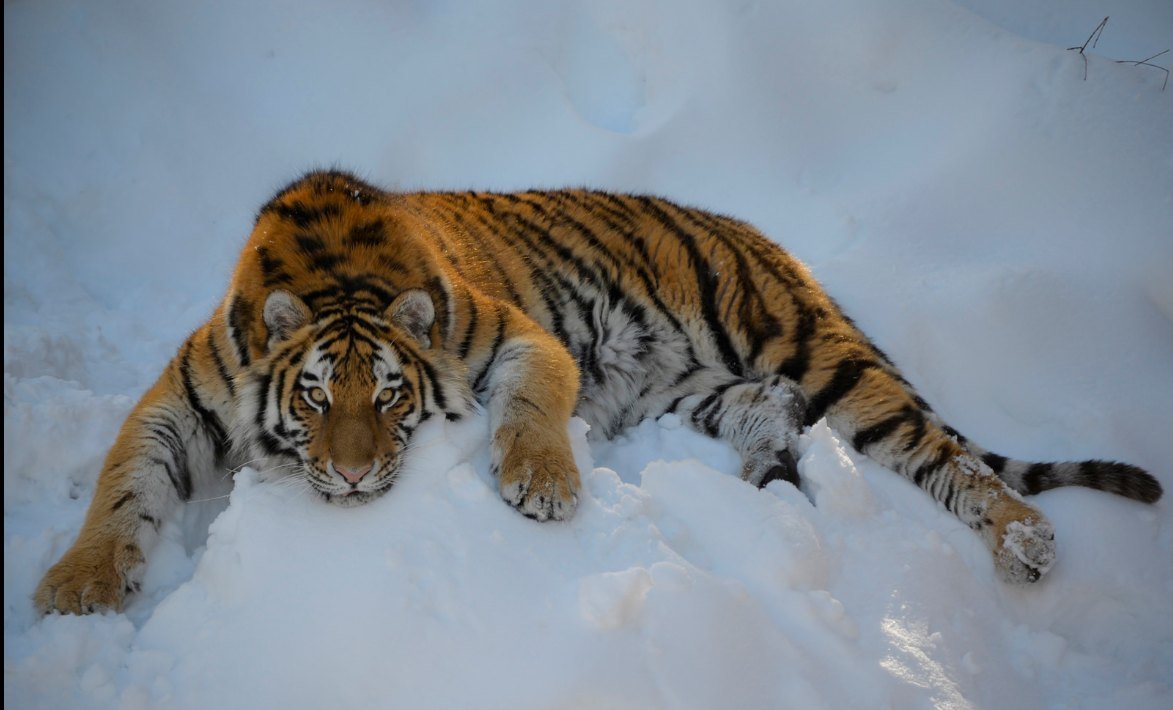
- Amur tiger habitat within the larger Northern Trail area
- Interactive map of Minnesota Zoo
- 44°46′07″N 93°11′56″W
- Date opened: May 22, 1978
- Location: Apple Valley, Minnesota, U.S.
- Land area: 485 acres (196 ha)
- No. of animals: 4,509 (2019)
- No. of species: 505 (2019)
- Total volume of tanks: 1,100,000 US gallons (4,200,000 L)
- Annual visitors: 1.3 million (2019)
- Memberships: AZA, WAZA
- Major exhibits: Discovery Bay, Family Farm, Grizzly Coast, Minnesota Trail, Northern Trail, Tropics Trail
- Public transit: MVTA
- Website: www.mnzoo.org

The Minnesota Zoo (formerly the Minnesota Zoological Garden) is an AZA-accredited zoo in Apple Valley, Minnesota. The zoo is one of two state-supported zoos in the United States, with the other being the North Carolina Zoo. When it opened on May 22, 1978, it was fairly revolutionary in its exhibit design. The zoo, built in a suburbanizing rural area, had more space to house exhibits and was one of the first zoos to organize its animals by their living environment as opposed to their species.

The Minnesota Zoo is a state agency. This differs from other zoos in Minnesota and most others in the United States, which are run by municipalities or private organizations. The Minnesota Zoo charges admission and sells annual memberships. The zoo is also home to a high school, the School of Environmental Studies.

== Exhibits and attractions ==
Exhibits are arrayed in six themed areas, including three themed walking trails ranging from one mile (1.6 kilometers) to two miles (3.2 kilometers) in length:

- Medtronic Minnesota Trail, featuring animals native to Minnesota.
- Northern Trail, featuring animals of the north (above the 45th parallel north).
- Tropics Trail, an indoor walking trail featuring animals from the tropics.
- Discovery Bay, an activity area themed around marine wildlife.
- Russia's Grizzly Coast, a part-indoor, part-outdoor exhibit featuring animals from Russia's Far East and the Kamchatka Peninsula.
- Wells Fargo Family Farm, themed around farm animals, having babies in the spring.

=== Medtronic Minnesota Trail ===
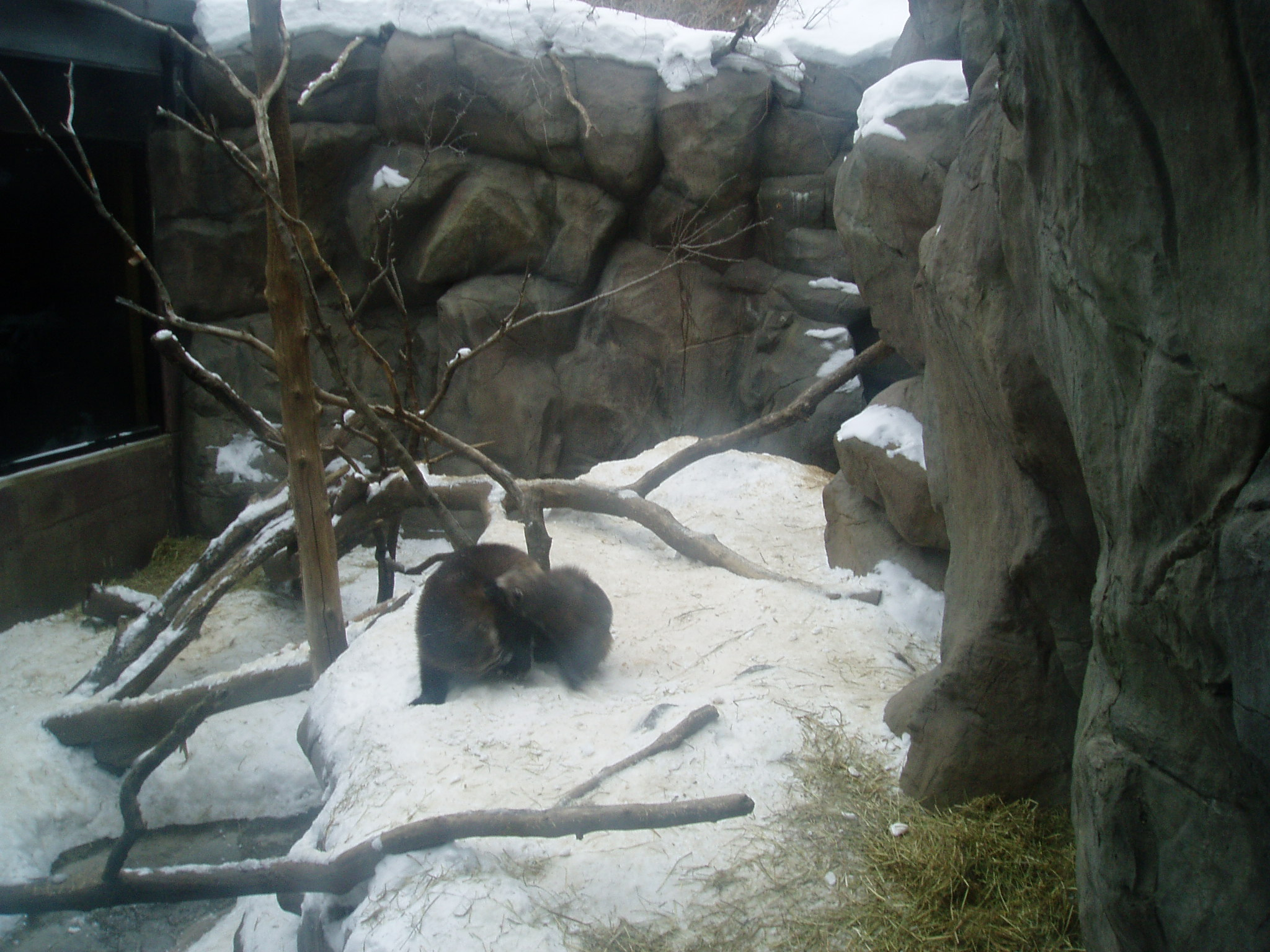
Wolverines on the Minnesota Trail

The Medtronic Minnesota Trail features animals native to Minnesota. The trail, which had been nearly the same since it opened in 1978, was reopened in 2007 after a year-long renovation. The trail now features a "north woods" look and includes exhibits for raccoons, coyotes, and gray wolves together with long-time residents like beaver, otter, puma, and lynx. Smaller Minnesota animals, like turtles, frogs and salamanders are featured in the exhibit's "trailhead", which is styled after a lodge. The quarter-mile (400-meter) trail takes guests through more than fifteen wildlife exhibits where they experience a variety of Minnesota landscapes, ranging from views into a beaver pond, a walk alongside a northern forest glade and a bird-watching perch in the treetops. The Minnesota Zoo received the Association of Zoos and Aquarium's (AZA) 2008 Significant Achievement Award for this trail. Animals in this area include:

- American black bear (Ursus americanus)
- American toad (Anaxyrus americanus)
- Canada lynx (Lynx canadensis)
- Common mudpuppy (Necturus maculosus)
- Coyote (Canis latrans)
- Fisher (Martes pennanti)
- Gray wolf (Canis lupus)
- Great horned owl (Bubo virginianus)
- North American beaver (Castor canadensis)
- North American porcupine (Erethizon dorsatum)
- North American river otter (Lontra canadensis)
- Northern leopard frog (Lithobates pipiens)
- Puma (Puma concolor)
- Wolverine (Gulo gulo)

=== Northern Trail ===
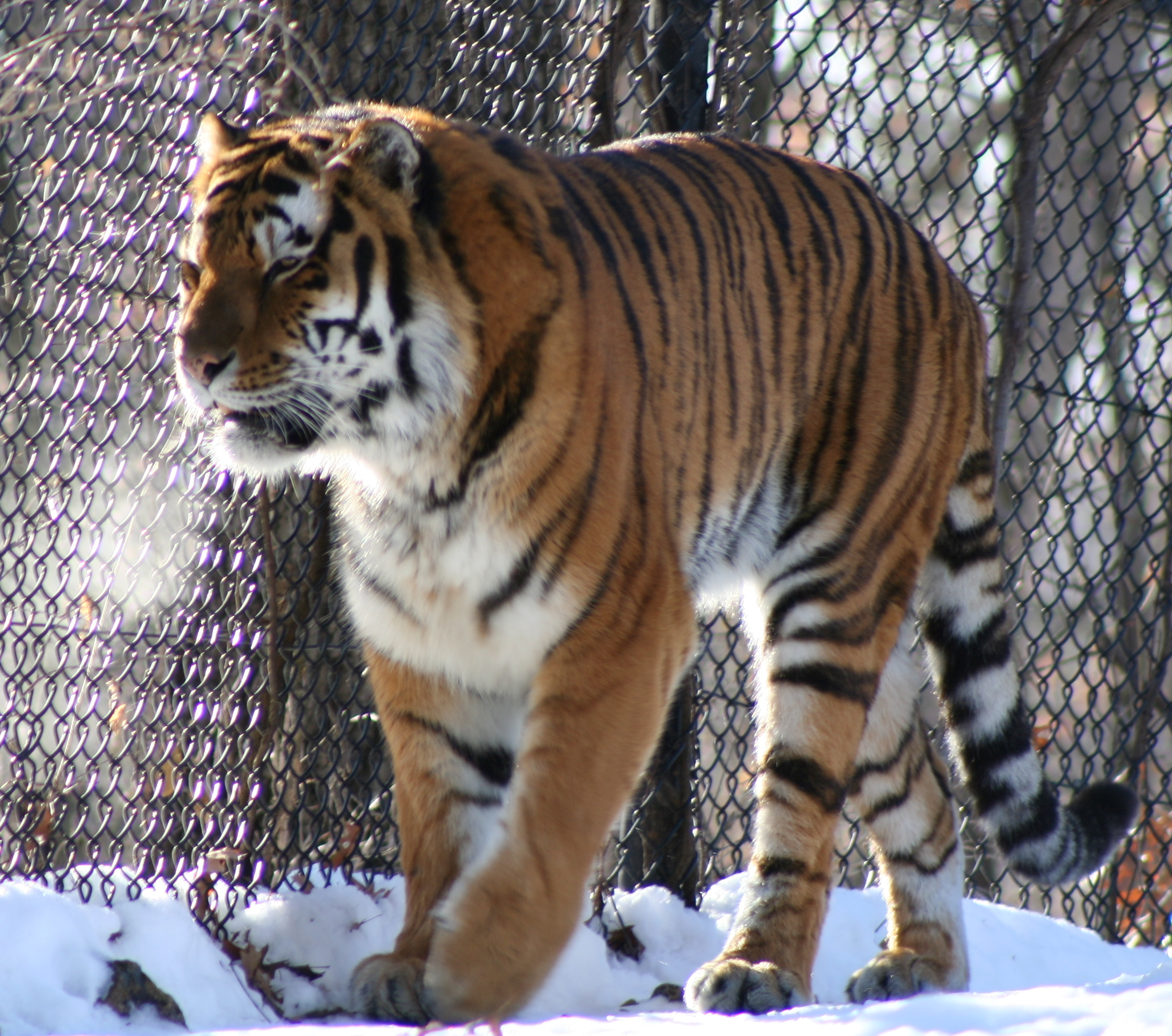
An Amur tiger at the Minnesota Zoo

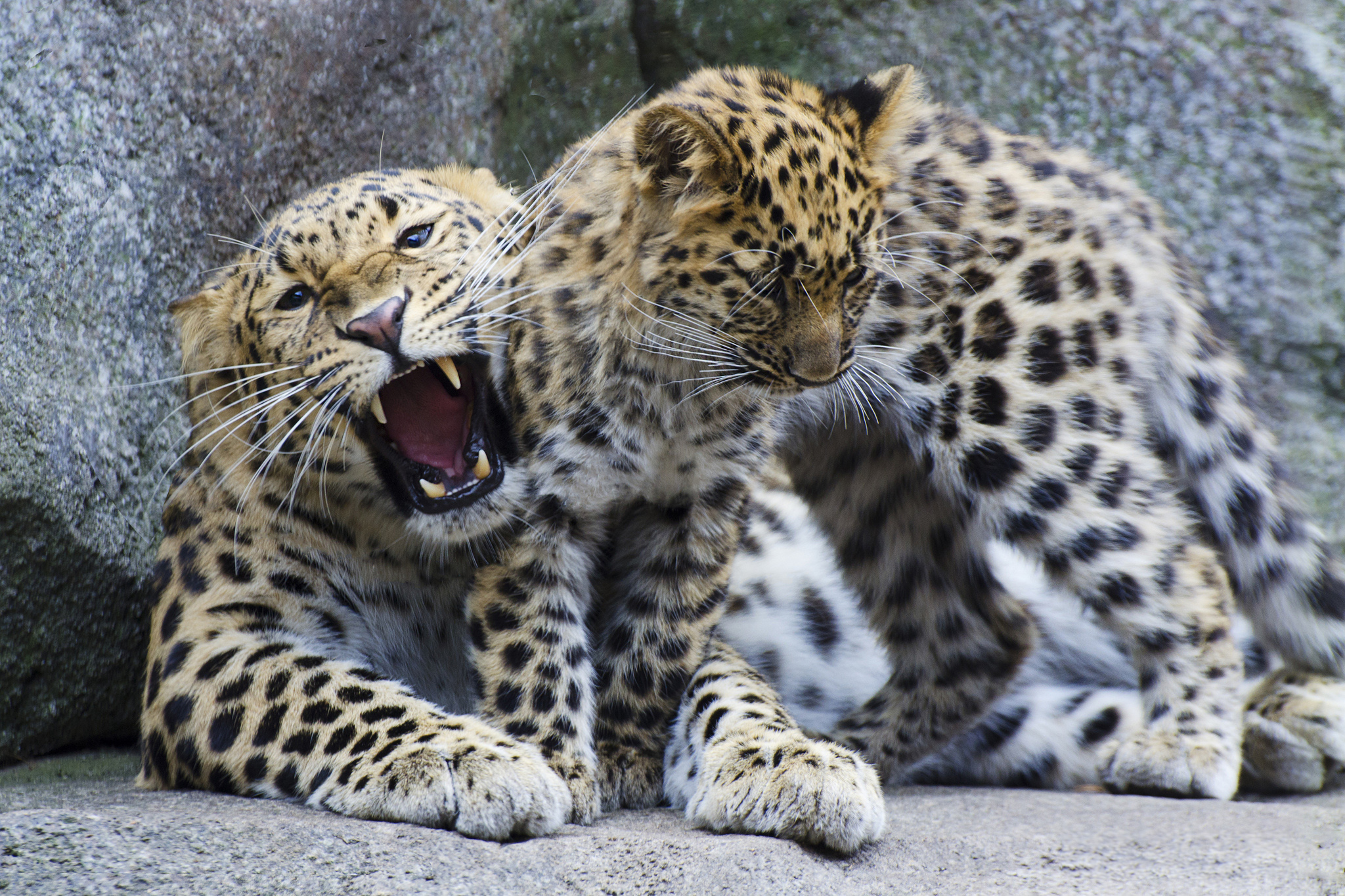
Amur leopard with cub at the Minnesota Zoo

The 3/4 mile (1.21 kilometer) Northern Trail features animals found north of the 45th parallel. The Northern Trail could also be seen from the Treetop Trail which was converted from the zoo's old monorail track. Animals in this area include:

- American bison (Bison bison)
- Amur tiger (Panthera tigris tigris)
- Bactrian camel (Camelus bactrianus)
- Black-tailed prairie dog (Cynomys luvodicianus)
- Boreal woodland caribou (Rangifer tarandus caribou)
- Llama (Lama glama)
- Moose (Alces alces)
- Pronghorn (Antilocapra americana)
- Przewalski's horse (Equus ferus przewalskii)
- Red-crowned crane (Grus japonensis)
- Red panda (Ailurus fulgens)
- Sichuan takin (Budorcas taxicolor tibetana)
- Tufted deer (Elaphodus cephalophus)

Muskoxen were featured on the Northern Trail from the zoo's opening until 2021. The zoo ended their breeding program around 2011 due to the warming climate of the state taking a toll on the health of the animals in the summer, with the last two members of the aging herd being euthanized in late April 2021.

=== Tropics Trail ===
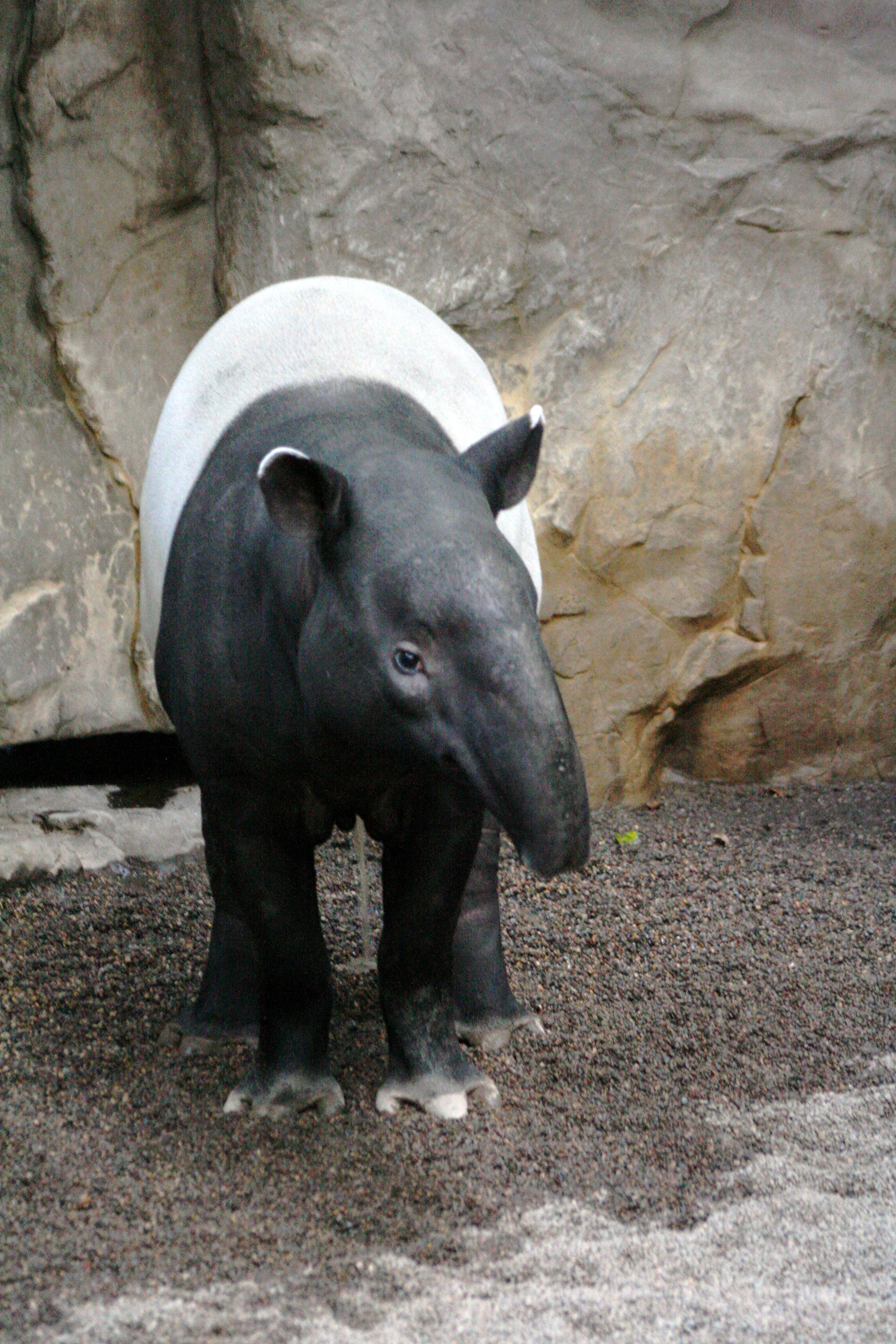
A Malayan tapir at the Minnesota Zoo

The Tropics Trail is an indoor trail that gives the impression of being in a tropical rainforest. Animals in this area include:

- Asian forest tortoise (Manouria emys)
- Bali myna (Leucopsar rothschildi)
- Bernier's teal (Anas bernieri)
- Hog-Islands boa (Boa constrictor imperator)
- Common shelduck (Tadorna tadorna)
- Crested oropendola (Psarocolius decumanus)
- De Brazza's monkey (Cercopithecus neglectus)
- Demoiselle crane (Grus virgo)
- Dwarf crocodile (Osteolaemus tetraspis)
- Eastern black-and-white colobus (Colobus guereza)
- Freckled duck (Stictonetta naevosa)
- Garganey (Spatula querquedula)
- Golden lion tamarin (Leontopithecus rosalia)
- Great argus (Argusianus argus)
- Henkel's leaf-tailed gecko (Uroplatus henkeli)
- Indian star tortoise (Geochelone elegans)
- Komodo dragon (Varanus komodoensis)
- Lesser flamingo (Phoeniconaias minor)
- Linnaeus's two-toed sloth (Choloepus didactylus)
- Long-haired fruit bat (Stenonycteris lanosus)
- Malayan tapir (Tapirus indicus)
- Northern white-cheeked gibbon (Nomascus leucogenys)
- Oriental magpie-robin (Copsychus saularis)
- Radiated tortoise (Astrochelys radiata)
- Red river hog (Potamochoerus porcus)
- Rhinoceros hornbill (Buceros rhinoceros)
- Ring-tailed lemur (Lemur catta)
- Silvery lutung (Trachypithecus cristatus)
- Southern tamandua (Tamandua tetradactyla)
- Southern three-banded armadillo (Tolypeutes tricinctus)
- Sri Lankan junglefowl (Gallus lafayettii)
- Straw-coloured fruit bat (Eidolon helvum)
- Victoria crowned pigeon (Goura victoria)

=== Discovery Bay ===
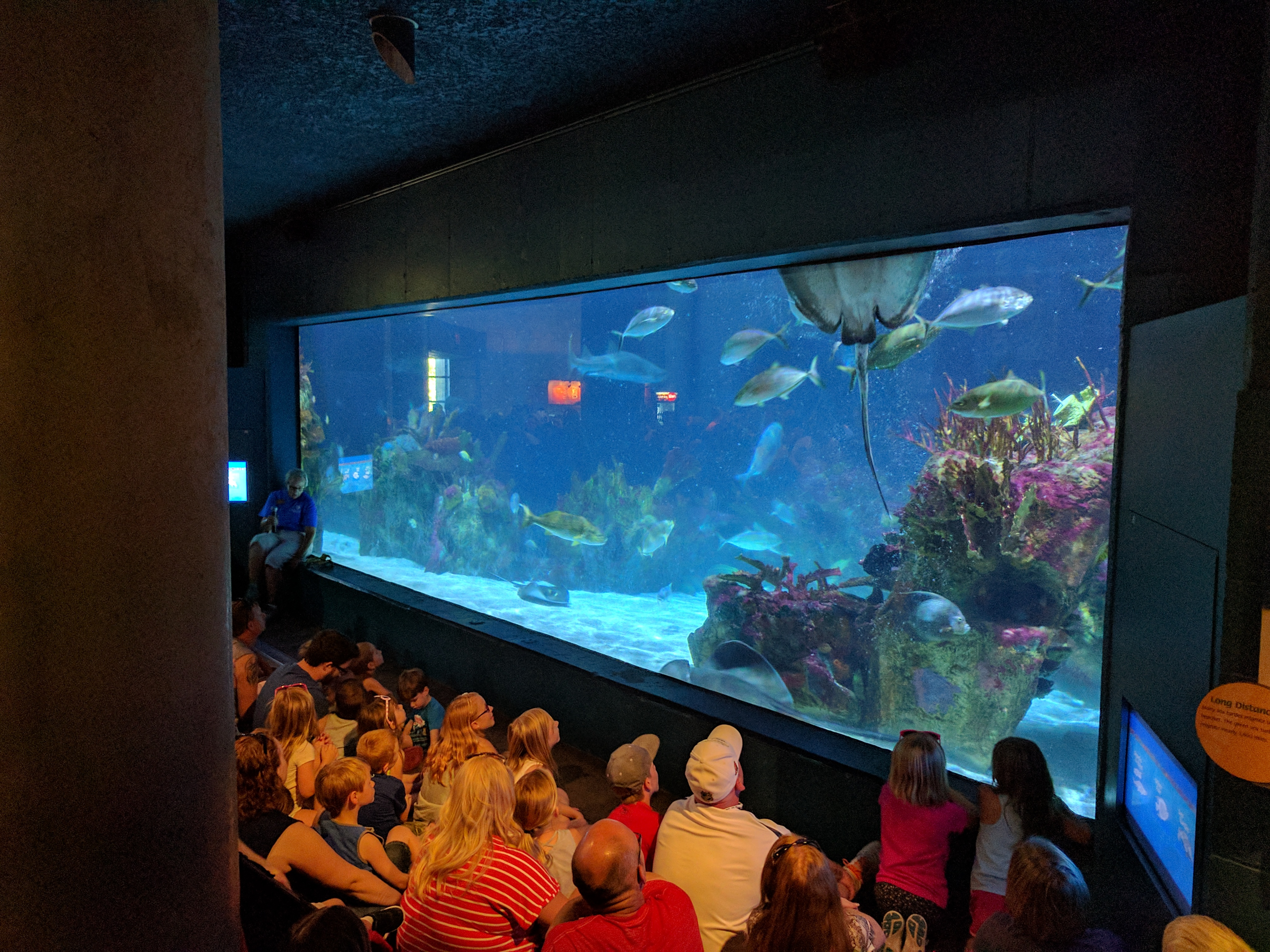
Presentation of the aquarium

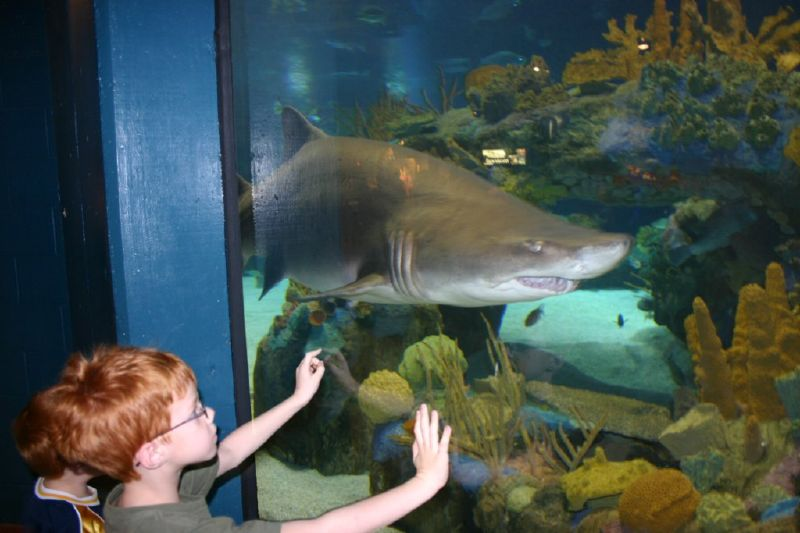
The zoo is home to a large collection of sea life

Discovery Bay contains several aquariums with a combined 1,100,000 US gallons (4,200,000 L) of water. Guests have an opportunity to touch sharks, rays, sea stars and sea anemones in the interactive estuary and tide pool. At the entrance to the Tropics building, visitors can see the Wyland mural titled "Our Ocean Family", dedicated on September 8, 1997. Animals in this area include:

- Atlantic goliath grouper (Epinephelus itajara)
- Atlantic tarpon (Megalops atlanticus)
- California sea lion (Zalophus californianus)
- Florida pompano (Trachinotus carolinus)
- Green moray (Gymnothorax funebris)
- Green sea turtle (Chelonia mydas)
- Hawaiian monk seal (Neomonachus schauinslandi)
- Horn shark (Heterodontus francisci)
- Kemp's ridley sea turtle (Lepidochelys kempii)
- Leafy seadragon (Phycodurus eques)
- Leopard shark (Triakis semifasciata)
- Lined seahorse (Hippocampus erectus)
- Queen triggerfish (Balistes vetula)
- Sand tiger shark (Carcharias taurus)
- Southern stingray (Dasyatis americana)
- Weedy seadragon (Phyllopteryx taeniolatus)

=== Wells Fargo Family Farm ===
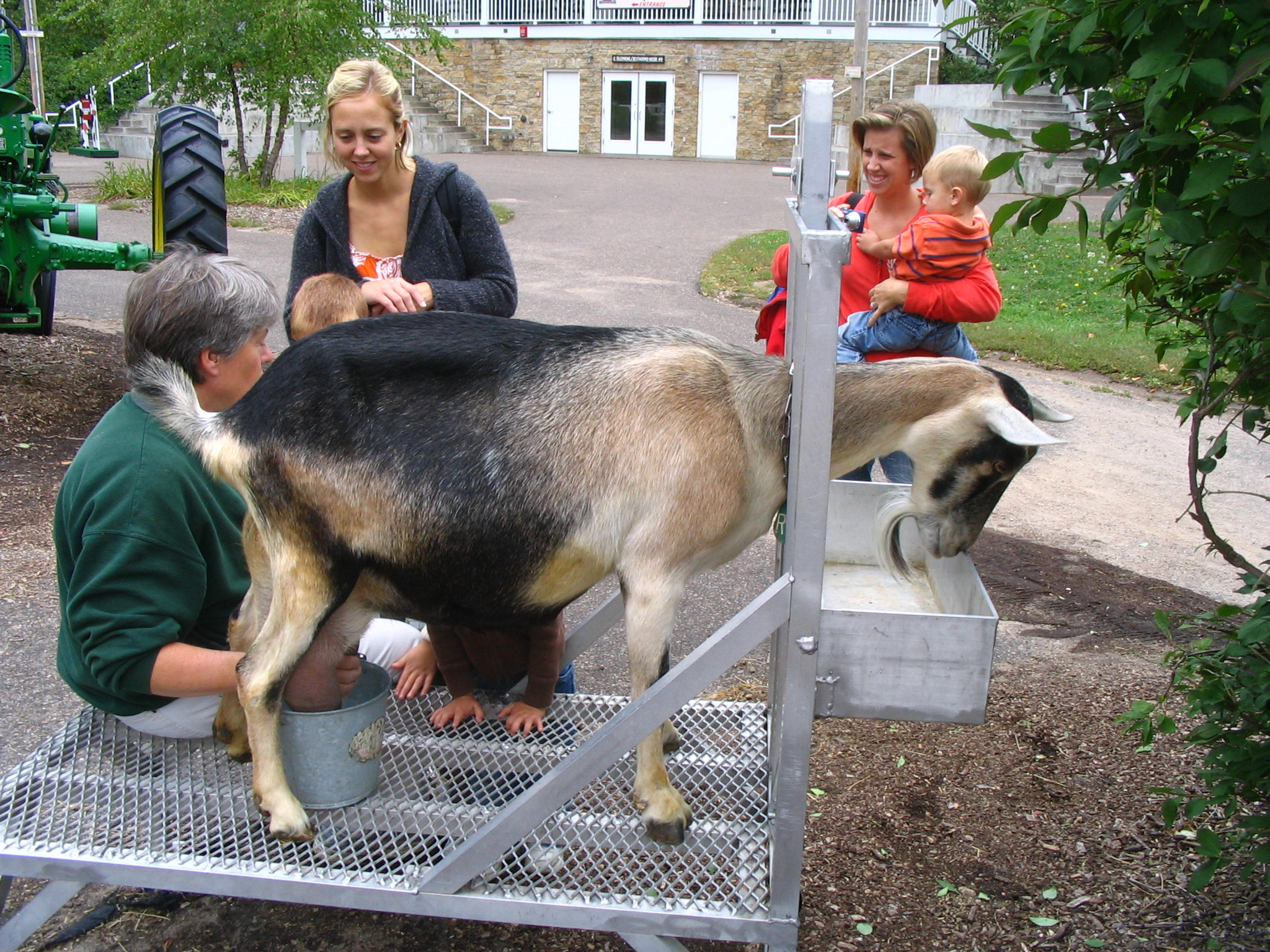
Milking a goat at the farm

The Wells Fargo Family Farm, which opened in May 2000, allows guests to touch and interact with domestic animals. The Farm exhibit showcases goats, sheep, pigs, cows, chickens, and horses. The Farm, a seasonal exhibit, is open every day beginning in April; the "Farm Babies" event marks the beginning each year. The Farm closes each fall for the season. The farm also gives a chance for visitors to watch the staff milk the cows.

=== Russia's Grizzly Coast ===
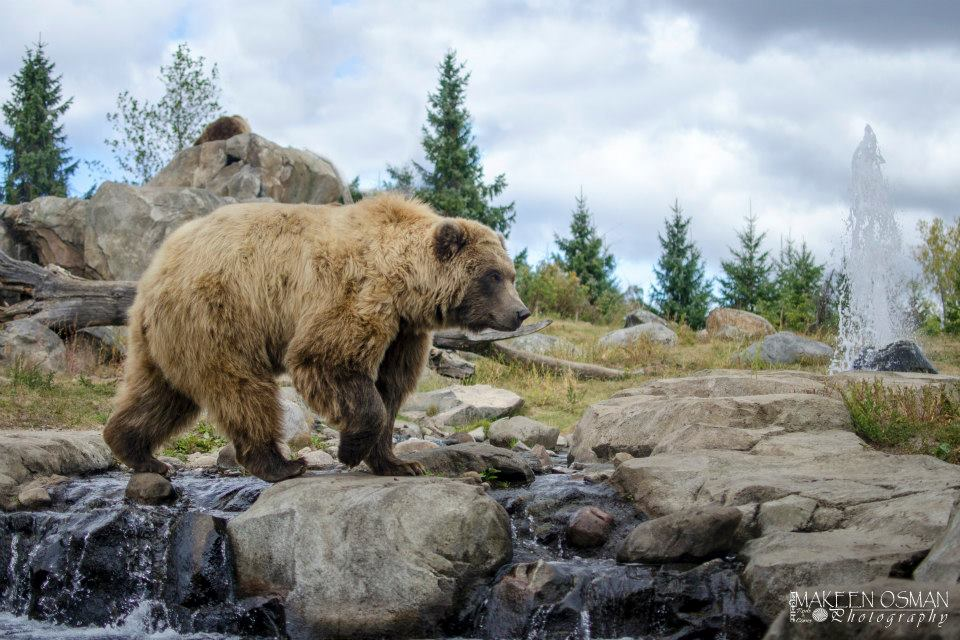
Brown bear

Russia's Grizzly Coast gives visitors a chance to see animals that live around Russia's Pacific coast, including sea otters, brown bears, Amur leopards, and wild boars in environments reminiscent of their homes in the Russian Far East. The 10,116-square-meter (2.5-acre), $23 million facility was the most expensive project to date at the zoo, and opened in June, 2008.

=== 3M Penguins of the African Coast ===
On July 9, 2011, the zoo premiered a new exhibit with African penguins.

=== Other attractions ===
Close to the entrance is an exhibit for Japanese macaques. There is also an outdoor amphitheater that is used for bird shows during summer zoo hours. After hours, the amphitheater is used for a popular "Music in the Zoo" series. The Minnesota zoo has a conservation carousel. The ride consist 56 animals from around the world. In order to ride the conservation carousel, zoo admission is required.

== Gallery ==
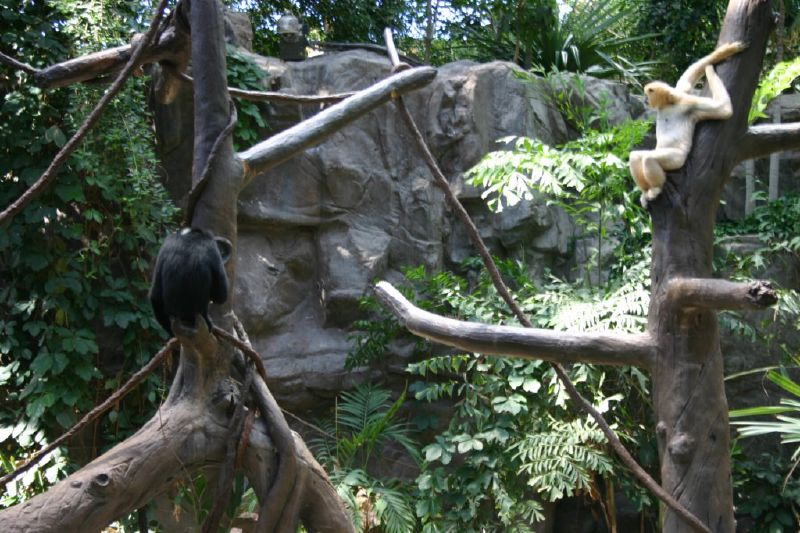
Primate exhibit.

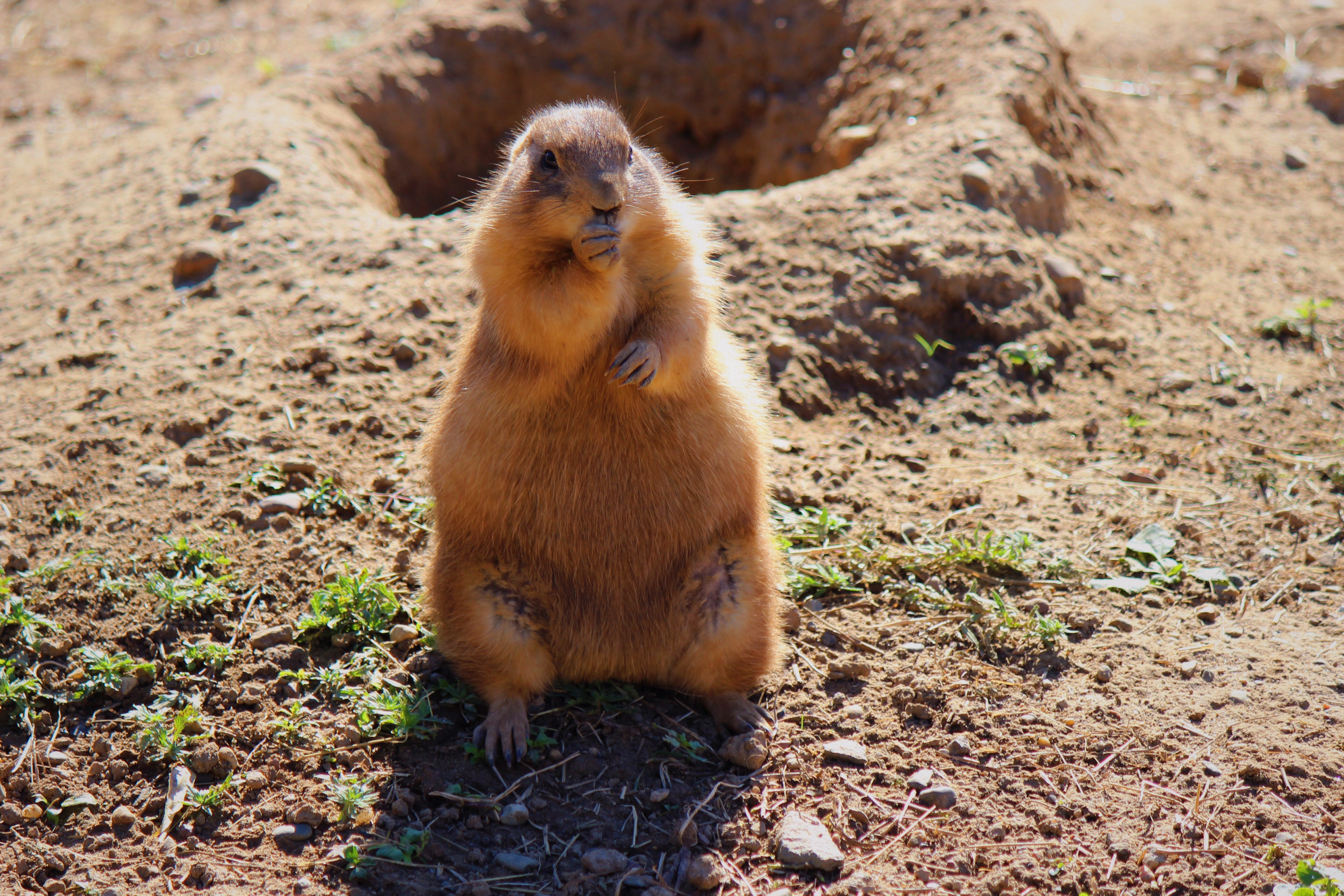
Prairie dog.

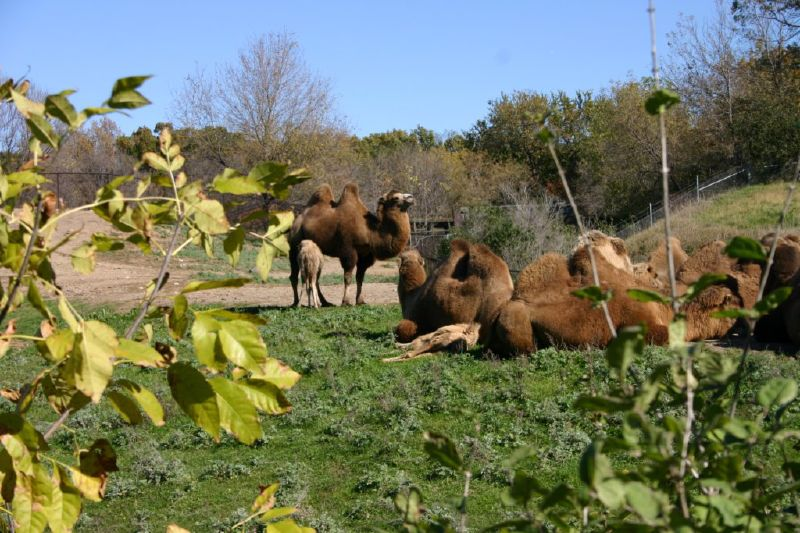
Camels in a natural environment.

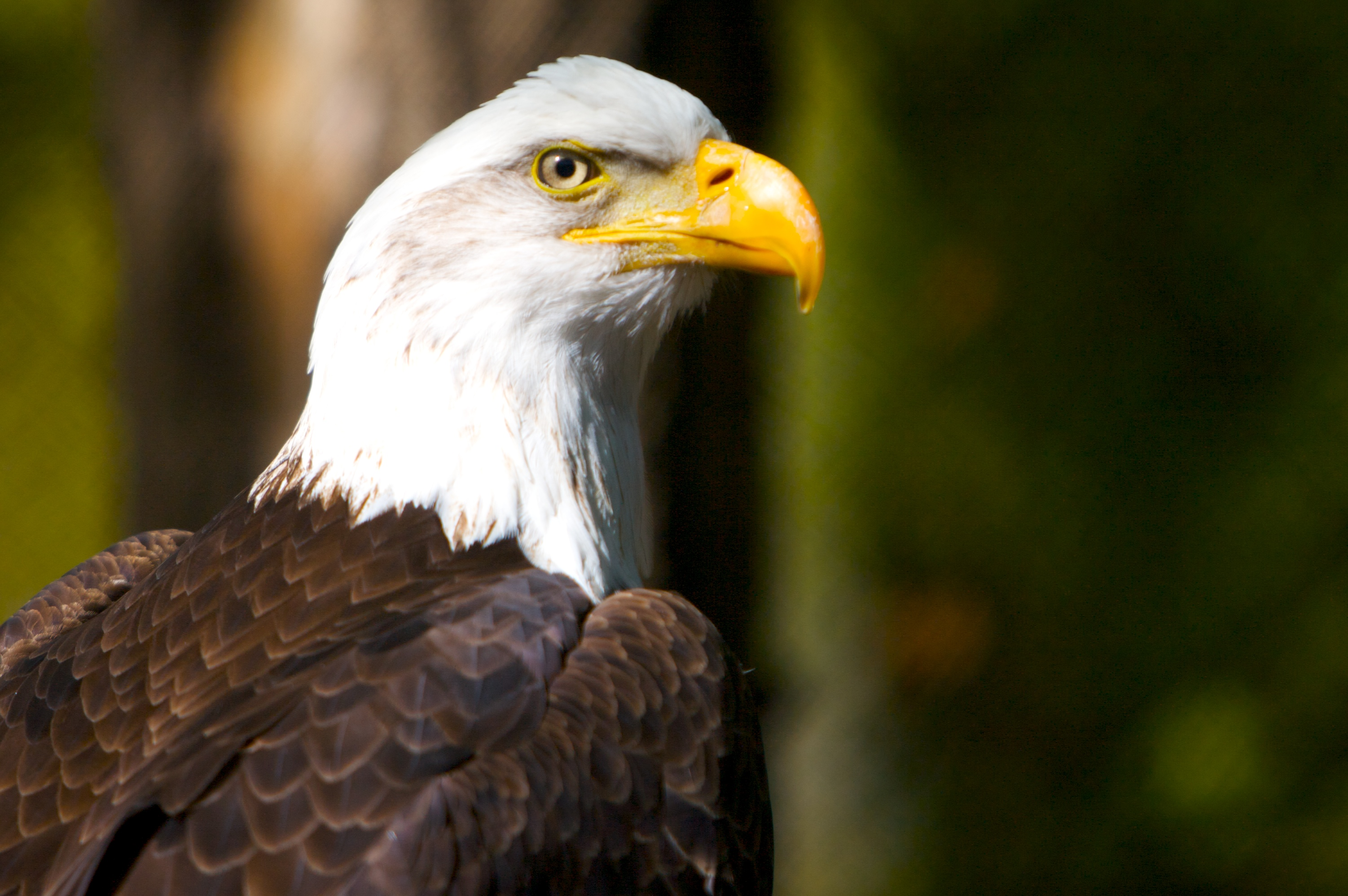
Bald eagle (Haliaeetus leucocephalus).

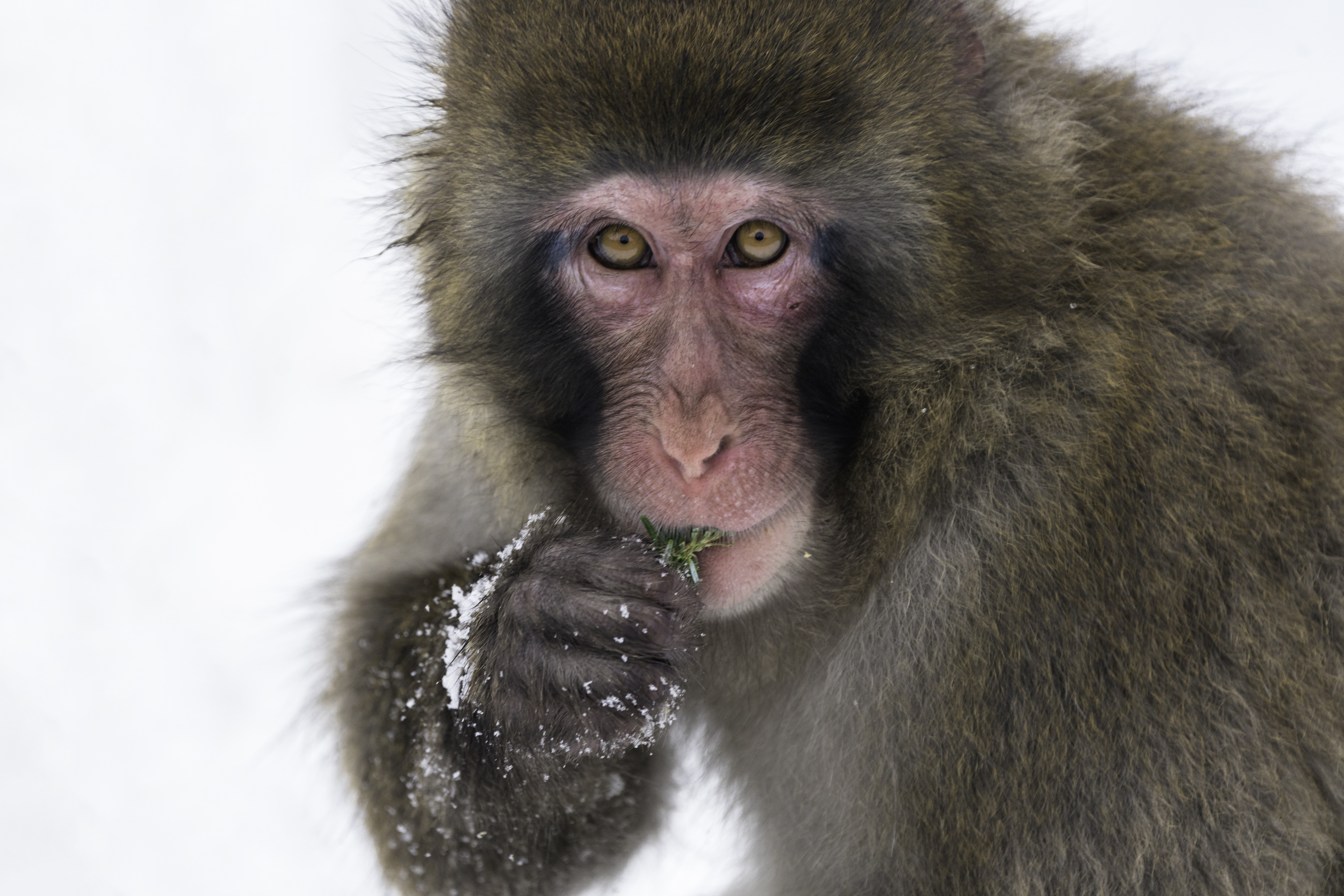
Japanese macaque (Macaca fuscata).

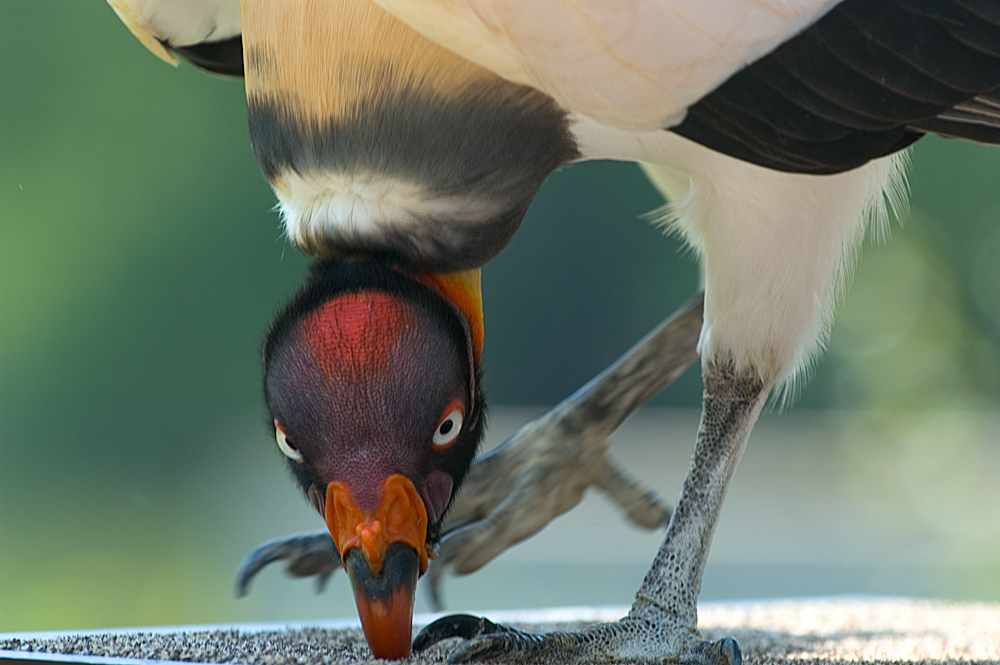
King vulture (Sarcoramphus papa).

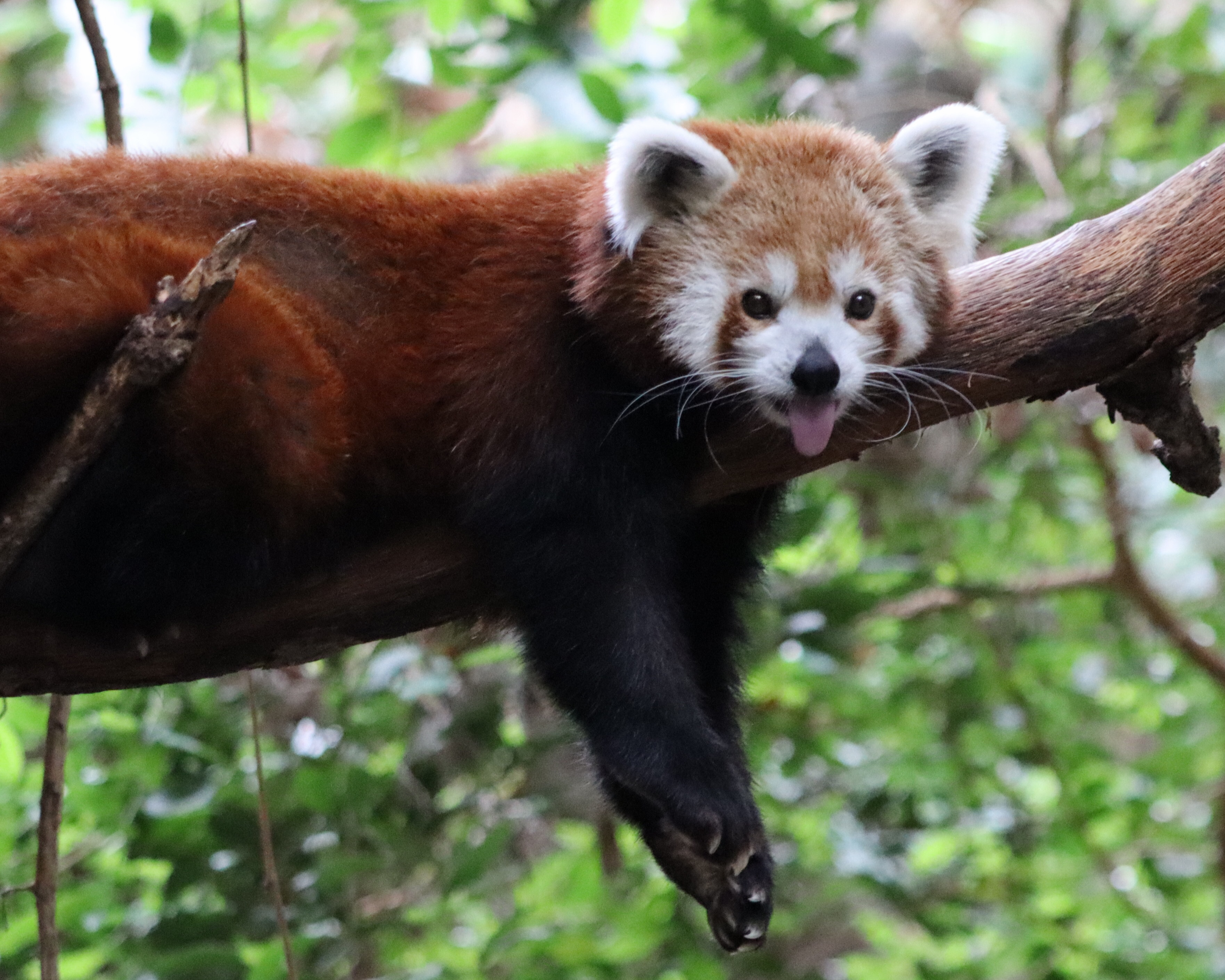
Red panda (Ailurus fulgens).

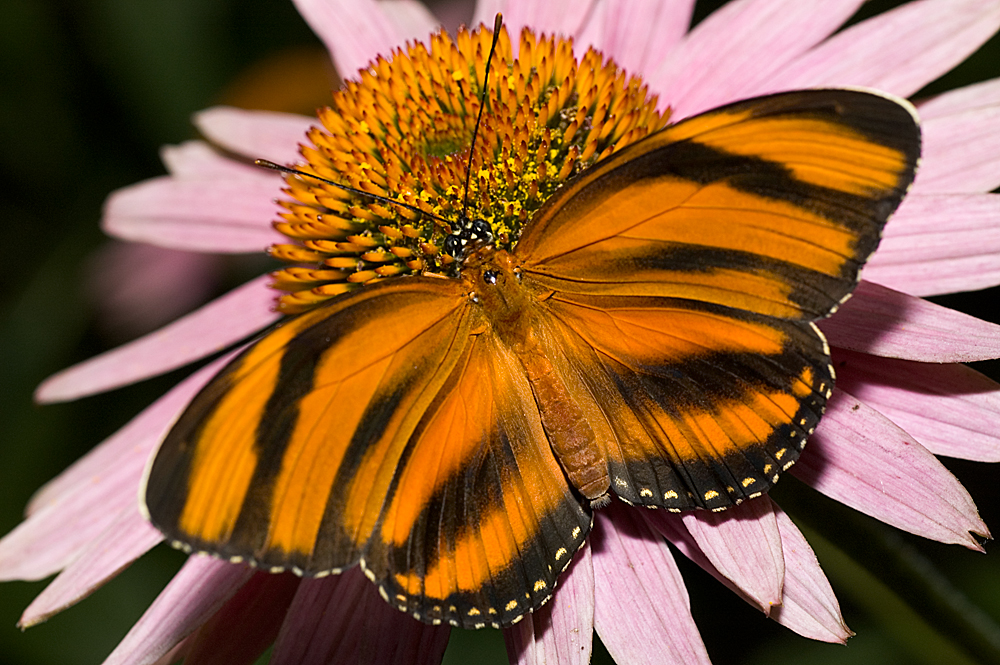
Butterfly Exhibit.

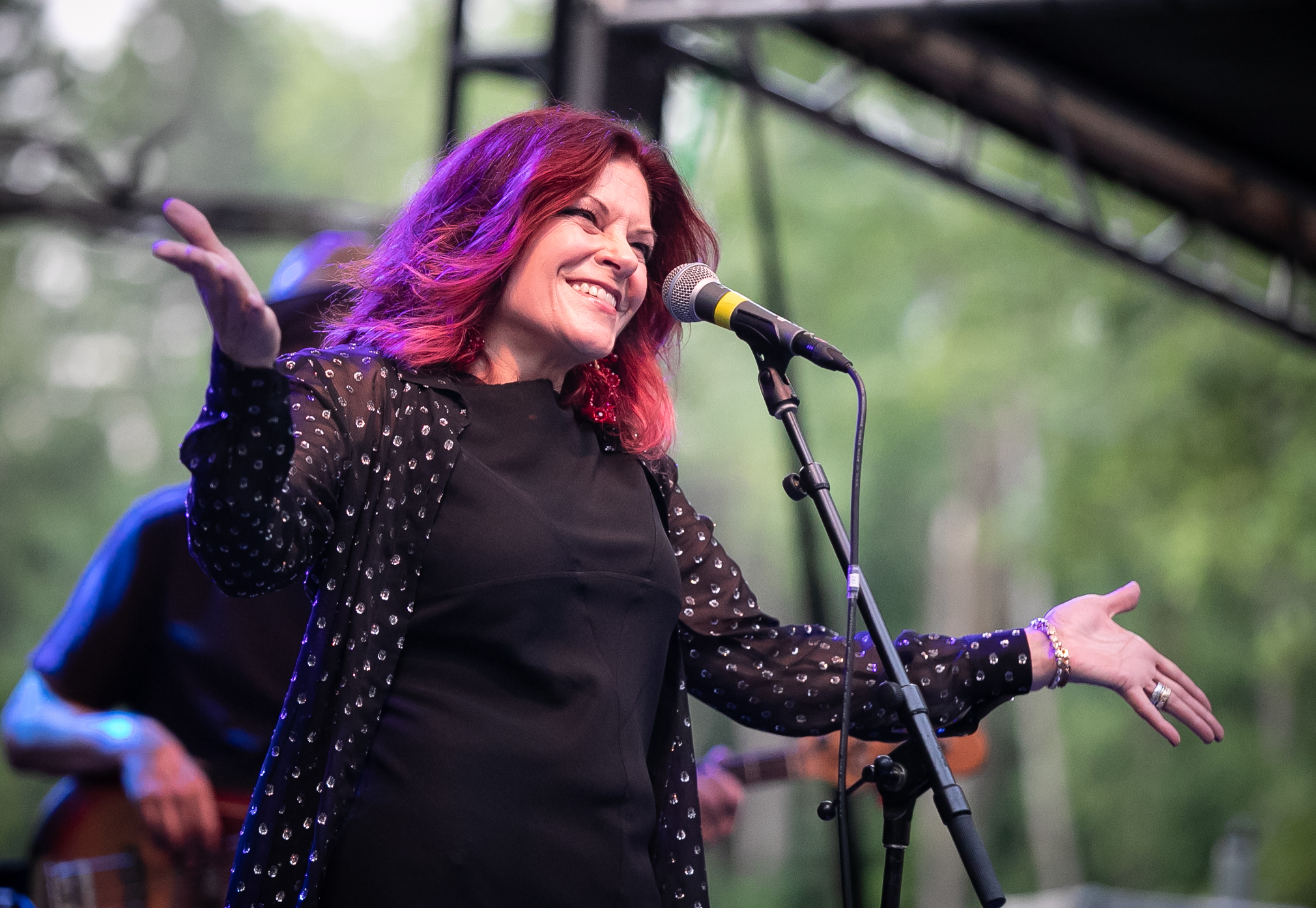
Many musical events are held at the zoo.

== Past exhibits ==
=== Beluga Whales ===
One of the first and perhaps most popular exhibits at the zoo was the beluga whale exhibit. The exhibit was home to two belugas, a male by the name of Anookalik (nicknamed "Big Mouth"), and a female by the name of Anana (nicknamed "Little Girl"). In later years, a bone infection was found within "Big Mouth's" jawbone (resulting from a collision with one of the tank fixtures) and forced immediate transfer of both whales to SeaWorld San Diego in the hopes of obtaining a more sophisticated means of veterinary treatment. In April 1987, a crowd of nearly 30,000 people filled the gates of the Minnesota Zoo to bid their final farewells to the two whales, who were transferred out of the zoo shortly thereafter. Little Girl died of heart failure on June 13, 1989, at the age of fourteen. Big Mouth, whose bone infection eventually proved to be fatal, was euthanized on July 16, 1990, at the age of seventeen.

=== Dolphins ===
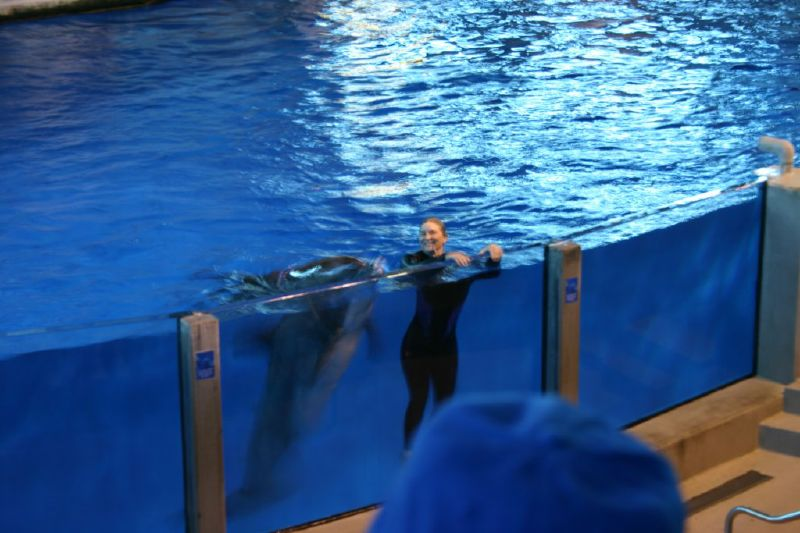
Dolphins were exhibited at the zoo since its opening in 1978 until 2012

Dolphins were exhibited at the zoo since its opening in 1978 until 2012. Hawaiian monk seals now reside in the dolphin tank. Director Lee Ehmke mentioned that in the future, perhaps a slim chance will come along that will allow the return of dolphins to the Minnesota Zoo. In 1992, Rio gave birth to the zoo's first successful captive-born dolphin, a male named "Shadow" sired by Semo.

In March 2006, Rio died at 35. She came to the Minnesota Zoo from the New York Aquarium in 1980. Rio gave birth to four calves at the Minnesota Zoo. One of Rio's calves, 7 month-old Harley, died earlier in January 2006 in a freak accident. He had been learning to swim between the pools when he jumped out of the water and hit his head on the deck between the pools. Another dolphin, "Ayla", who suffered from Scoliosis or curvature of the spine, was euthanized at age 14 in December 2006. She had stopped eating and stopped responding to her medication. At that time the remaining dolphins at the zoo were "Spree," "Chinook" and "Semo." In 2007, the zoo shipped Chinook, a 24-year-old male, to the National Aquarium in Baltimore. Chinook was moved because the aquarium had seven adult females and no adult males. Chinook fathered a calf and then moved to the Brookfield Zoo in 2010.

Two females, Allie and her mother, April, were additions to the Minnesota Zoo's bottlenose dolphin family in 2008. Both arrived on January 14, 2008, from Dolphin Connection in Florida. In September 2009, three bottlenose dolphins from the Brookfield Zoo arrived at the Discovery Bay habitat while their home stadium, the Seven Seas Dolphinarium, was being renovated. The three dolphins, Tapeko, and her daughters Noelani and Allison, remained in Minnesota for roughly six months until the tank in Brookfield was completed in the spring of 2010. This eventually brought the Minnesota Zoo's dolphin population up to 7. On April 15, 2010, Tapeko, Noelani, and Allison, made the return trip back to the Brookfield Zoo. Spree too was sent to Brookfield after it was decided she would have a better chance at acclimating herself to their social structure as she was generally outcast by Semo, April and Allie.

Semo had impregnated Allie in mid 2008. However, Allie suffered a stillbirth on March 26, 2009, much to the disappointment of zoo staff. In November 2009, it was confirmed by ultrasound that Allie was pregnant yet again, by Semo this time as well. The female calf was born on July 17, 2010, and through a Facebook vote was named Tajiah in late 2010. By January 2011, the pod consisted of 47-year-old Semo, 42-year-old April, her 23-year-old daughter Allie, and Allie's 6-month-old calf Taijah.

Dolphin shows at the zoo were put on hiatus in 2011. With Semo then in his mid 40s, the zoo felt it was best for them to avoid the more high-energetic behaviors usually performed by the younger members of the group. On February 15, 2011, April died and a necropsy was pending to determine cause of death. April was around 42 years old, making her one of the older bottlenose dolphins known in human care. On February 6, 2012, Semo and Allie's 1 1/2-year-old calf Tajiah died suddenly of complications from a stomach ulcer.

In all, a total of 19 dolphins have been housed at the zoo over the years: Semo, Flipper, April, Rio, Vince, Mindy, Chinook, Allie, Shadow, DJ, Ayla, Mindy's 1997 stillborn, Spree, Harley, Tapeko, Noelani, Allison, Allie's 2009 stillborn, and Taijah. As of 2022, Tapeko, Chinook, Allie, Shadow, Spree, Noelani, and Allison were still alive. Semo, Flipper, April, and Rio all surpassed the average expected lifespan of a bottlenose dolphin at approximately 54 years, 38 years, 42 years, and 35 years respectively.

On May 14, 2012, the zoo announced that the dolphin exhibit would come to a permanent end come fall. The Minnesota Legislature had recently granted the zoo $4 million towards the renovation of the Discovery Bay dolphin tanks, which were in need of repairs. The zoo had originally intended to temporarily transport its two remaining bottlenose dolphins, Semo and Allie, to other zoos or parks until renovations were complete, but the decision was made to end the dolphin exhibit once Semo and Allie were shipped out. It was unclear at the time where Semo and Allie would be shipped. It was assumed that because the Minnesota Zoo was part of the Dolphin Consortium (essentially a program that ensures genetic diversity among captive bottlenose dolphins), which consists of The Seas with Nemo & Friends at Epcot, the National Aquarium in Baltimore, Indianapolis Zoo, Dolphin Connection, Texas State Aquarium, and the Brookfield Zoo; one or the other were planned to be shipped to one of these locations. Semo's transfer was dubbed a "retirement". At nearly 50 years old, he was one of the oldest surviving male dolphins in human care. On October 3, 2012, Semo and Allie were transferred out of the zoo. Semo was moved to Six Flags Discovery Kingdom in Vallejo, California, while Allie was sent back to the Brookfield Zoo just outside Chicago. Semo died on May 1, 2018, at Discovery Kingdom. He was 54 years old and apparently died of natural causes.

In November 2022, dolphins temporarily returned to the Minnesota Zoo when Allie along with six bottlenose dolphins (two males named Lucky and Merlin, four females named Tapeko, Spree, Noelani, and Allison) arrived from the Brookfield Zoo. They were displayed in their Discovery Bay tank for several months until they returned to their Brookfield Zoo habitat in Spring of 2024.

=== Monorail ===
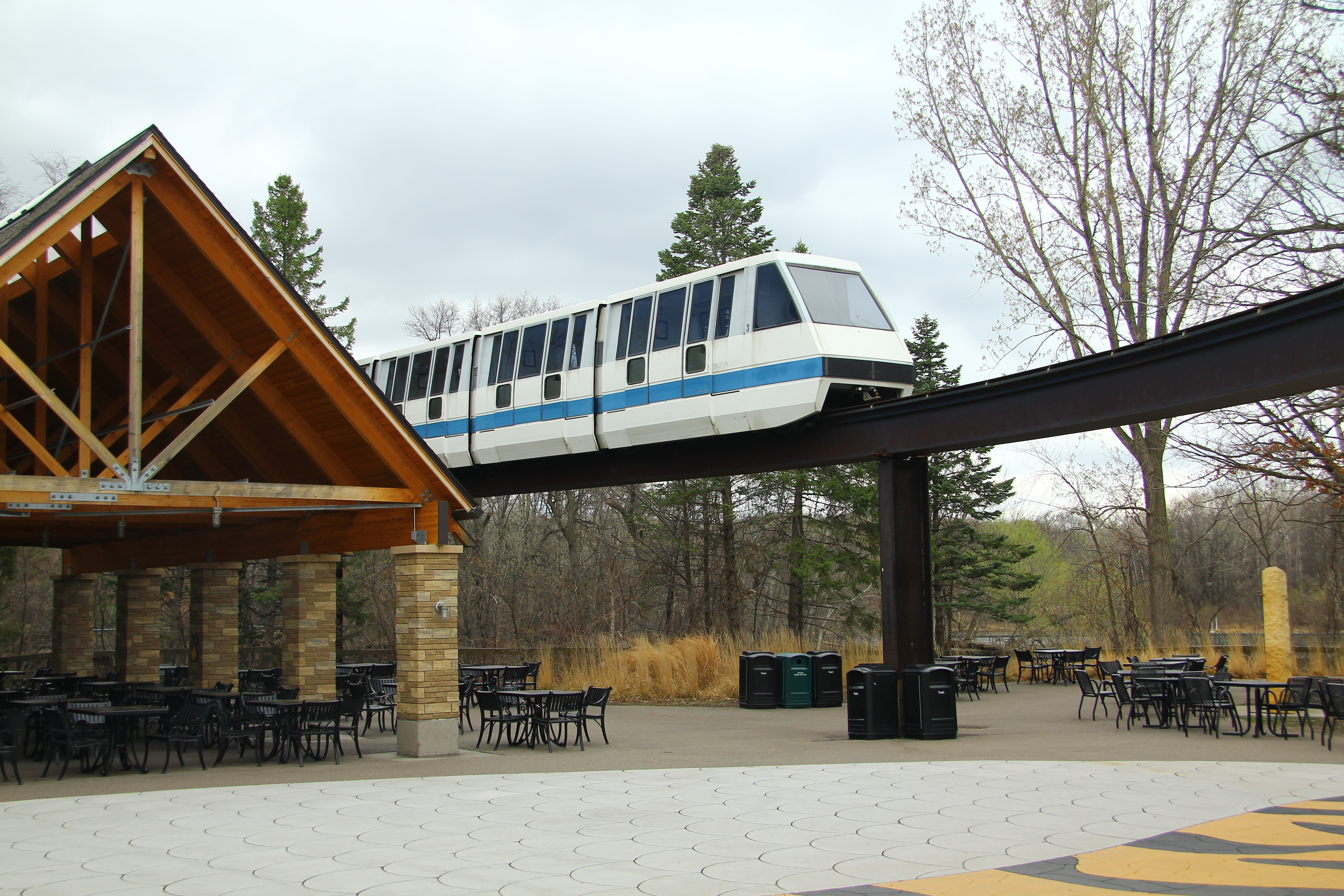
The zoo's monorail operated from 1979 to 2013

The zoo's monorail opened on September 20, 1979 as the Northern Trek Monorail. However, an incident occurred on May 31, 1980, where an electrical malfunction caused the monorail train to stall, its engine to spark, and produce a lot of smoke. After the incident the monorail would close for two weeks until it reopened. On October 1, 1985, the monorail closed down. The reason for its closing was because of decline in ridership in the fall and winter months. The ride later officially reopened on May 11, 1986.

A second incident on the ride occurred in August 1992, where 10 passengers had to be removed by ladder from a smoke-filled monorail car after an electrical fire broke out in a motor. Another incident occurred in June 2000 when two monorail trains (one containing 80 people and the other containing 70 people) crashed. A fourth incident occurred in March 2011 when a monorail train stalled on the elevated track, people on the train were stuck for two hours until Apple Valley firefighters arrived to rescue them. The monorail system continued to operate until it closed September 2, 2013.

The former monorail track was left standing vacant until 2019, when the zoo announced it will build the Treetop Trail walkway over the existing track. Construction of the 1.25-mile (2 kilometer) elevated pedestrian loop, which is the world's longest, began at the end of April 2022 and was completed in the summer of 2023.

=== IMAX Theater ===
The Great Clips IMAX Theatre was located on zoo grounds. At seven stories tall, it was once the largest IMAX theatre in Minnesota. It underwent a transition from analog to digital during the summer of 2014. In an email sent from the Minnesota Zoo to zoo members on January 18, 2019, it was announced that IMAX corporate will permanently close the facility on January 27, 2019. No reason was given. The zoo and IMAX had a partnership in which the zoo would show nature documentaries and IMAX would show mainstream movies.

== In popular culture ==
In 1987, the zoo served as the filming location for All About Animals, a title in the Little Schoolhouse series of educational children's videos.

== See also ==
- Como Zoo and Conservatory
- North Carolina Zoo – The only other zoo in the United States than Minnesota Zoo that is a state agency.
