= Eagan High School =

Public high school in Eagan, Minnesota, United States

Coordinates: 44.806912°N 93.134428°W

Location
- 4185 Braddock Trail; Eagan, Minnesota; United States

Information
- Type: Public high school
- Motto: Technology Enhanced Education With A Human Touch
- Established: 1989
- School district: ISD 196
- Principal: Polly Reikowski
- Teaching staff: 114.52 (FTE)
- Grades: 9–12
- Enrollment: 2,202 (2023–2024)
- Student to teacher ratio: 19.23
- Colors: Royal blue, Kelly green, silver
- Mascot: Wildcat
- Newspaper: Eagan Independent
- Yearbook: Epilogue
- Website: ehs.district196.org

Eagan High School (EHS) is a public high school in east-central Eagan, Minnesota, United States. The school opened in fall 1989 for ninth-grade students and for grades ten through twelve the following year. It is particularly noted for its fine arts programs and use of technology. As of the 2022–2023 school year, EHS had 2,171 students.

The school is a part of Minnesota Independent School District 196 (Rosemount-Apple Valley-Eagan School District), and is affiliated with the Minnesota State High School League (MSHSL). The school was a member of the Lake Conference from their first year until the 2010–11 school year when they joined the South Suburban Conference.

== History ==
In the 1970s and 1980s, Eagan began to grow rapidly, due to the completion of I-35E, I-494 and the new Cedar Avenue Bridge. During those years, high school students from Eagan who lived within the District 196 boundaries attended nearby Rosemount High School and Apple Valley High School. Both of these high schools were greatly over capacity. In June 1987, Thomas F. Wilson was appointed as "Principal on Special Assignment" in charge of planning a new high school and middle school on a site that had been purchased years earlier. To save costs, the two schools were designed to share some facilities. The $33 million building was designed by Hammel, Green and Abrahamson (HGA).

The school was built in four different bid phases (called fast tracking-necessary due to earlier bond issue defeats) and bids on the fourth phase, anticipated to be approximately $27 million, came in at $33 million. Because the school district did not have the money for that large bid, the bid was rejected. Wilson, Superintendent Red Rehwalt and Assistant Superintendent John Hanson spent several months working with HGA officials to trim elements of phase four to get its costs in line with the bond revenues available from the public approval process. Eventually, the school board adopted a different construction firm (Wold Association-Architects) and this caused a delay in the construction time line and time, and spawned a lawsuit.

Before it opened, Wilson met with parents and students to choose the school's colors, nickname, logo and school song. They chose the Wildcats as the school mascot and decided the school's colors should be Royal Blue, Kelly Green, Silver, and White. School nurse Sharon Geiger led the color selection process. Wilson and Assistant Principal David Lange sought and received permission from the Kansas State University Athletic Director (fee of $1.00) to use their Wildcat logo. Assistant Principal Polly Reikowski and Speech Program Director Joni Anker developed the words for the School Song, sung to the tune of the Notre Dame Fight Song. The high school first opened in the fall of 1989–90, operating on the west side of the building (Dakota Hills Middle School) with 350 ninth-grade students. These students attended school on the second floor, while sixth and seventh grade students attended on the first floor of the same middle school, fulfilling a promise to parents that students from the two schools would not be mixed together, even though they were attending school in the same building. By the opening of the 1990–1991 school year, students in grades nine through twelve completed the full opening of Eagan High School. The first class to graduate from Eagan High School was the class of 1991, with students who had attended only their senior year at EHS.

The first principal was Thomas F. Wilson, who had previously been principal at Rosemount High School within the District. Wilson held the position for fifteen years of the high school's existence, from 1987 to 2002. Upon his retirement in 2002, a controversial replacement, Jane Stewart, was appointed by the Superintendent at the time, John Haro. Citing her "paucity of qualifications" and upset at her quick appointment, the entire faculty walked out of their first meeting with her. Stewart nonetheless began as principal, but early-on was involuntarily transferred to a position in the district office—spawning a lawsuit for employment discrimination. Assistant Principal for Fine Arts, Polly Reikowski was promoted to Principal.

== School facilities ==
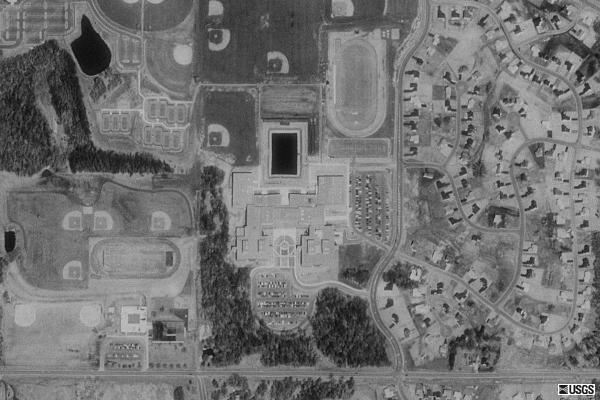
An aerial view of the Eagan High School building (including the attached middle school) and some of the surrounding athletic fields, taken shortly after the school opened. The right half of the building is the high school. Since this picture was taken, the building has been expanded twice and an additional parking lot has been added.

The high school is attached to Dakota Hills Middle School, and the two schools each have access to a common auditorium, a series of athletic fields, and a municipal park. Although they share a common building, the two schools are completely separated and there is almost no incidental interaction between the middle school and high school students.

=== Expansion and renovation ===
When the high school opened, it was built to accommodate 1200 students but was designed to be expanded to handle an additional 800 students. This expansion was necessary almost immediately and was completed within a few years of the opening. That expansion, completed in March 1993, included additional classrooms, teacher offices, and science labs. Another expansion was completed in 2005; this most recent expansion added yet more classrooms but also included additional locker bays, circulation improvements to prevent hallway congestion, and an improved entryway for students and visitors.

=== Technology ===
Eagan High School stresses technology in education, a commitment set down by former principal Wilson and shown in the school's motto: "Technology-enhanced education with a human touch." When the school opened, it became the first fully networked high school in the nation. Six hundred computers were sold at a discount by Apple Computer, which publicized EHS worldwide as a "demonstration school". Every room was equipped with a television, which received satellite broadcasts as well as programs from the school's television studio. Now, EHS has replaced those televisions with LAN projectors that any teacher can connect to wirelessly while connected to the school's network.

Departmental fundraising allowed for the construction of a fully operational television studio within the school. The main purpose of the studio was the ability to loan out the equipment for student or community projects, but the construction of the studio also allowed the school to create a weekly television series called Eagan AM. It is aired every Thursday morning during PAWS, a homeroom-like activity that takes place each morning, and can be viewed online at CatCast, the school's video-sharing platform.

In 1999, the school helped test the use of fingerprint scans for checking out books in the library—making it one of the first schools in the nation to use biometric data for school services. They have since discontinued this method of checkout and now use student and faculty ID cards instead.

In 2002, EHS became one of the first high schools in the nation to require students to register for classes online. The school uses Infinite Campus, a student-teacher communication and grading service, to do this.

The building has wireless Internet access throughout the school for student, faculty, and guest use. Teachers use MacBook Pros to wirelessly transmit attendance and grades to Infinite Campus, an online student/teacher communication platform. This information can be accessed through individual Infinite Campus accounts made available for students and parents. The school has ten iMac computer labs, all running on Mac OS X. Every school Mac is also equipped with the full Adobe Publishing and Creative suites, the Microsoft Office 2008 or 2011 suite, and the Apple iWork suite. There are two different kinds of labs the school utilizes: stationary and mobile computer labs. The stationary labs consist of 40 iMacs each, allowing students to get online and collaborate on projects. The mobile labs consist of 30-40 MacBooks each and can be wheeled around from classroom to classroom on carts.

In 2011, district 196 rolled out a new tool to its schools: Google Apps (later Google Workspace for Education. This Google Apps platform gave students and faculty access to collaborative educational tools such as Google Drive, Google Docs, and Google Slides. Most teachers at EHS currently use this platform to grade student assignments and monitor student collaboration activities. Many students there now prefer using Google Docs as an alternative to Microsoft Word or Pages, as they can work with other students more easily online. Because of the positive feedback District 196 has received from its students about Google Apps, it plans to keep using it as an educational tool.

In 2012, EHS's health department began using iPad 2s in the classroom. In each health classroom, there are 40 iPads available for student use; students use them to read articles selected by their teachers, take tests and quizzes using Infinite Campus, also an online testing platform, and watch videos pertaining to the subject matter they are currently studying. Eagan is the first high school in District 196 to implement the iPad in the classroom.

In 2013, EHS began participating in a beta-test program of different electronic devices for potential use throughout ISD 196. In the 2013–14 school year, freshman history classes tested the use of Chromebooks in the classroom. This program was being expanded in the 2014–15 school year district-wide, as several classrooms beta-tested the use of iPad Minis for each student.

In 2015, voters in district 196 approved a bond referendum that designated $5 million per year for ten years to improve technology in the school; one part of this plan was to provide an iPad mini to every student in fourth through 12th grade. In the first phase of the district-wide one-to-one initiative in 2016, every EHS 9th grader was given an iPad mini. The iPad minis were used to allow students to work together, take online notes, turn in assignments online, and even take online quizzes and tests.

In 2017, EHS seniors, and juniors were given full-sized iPads, while all the other students were given iPad minis. This completed the district-wide one-to-one initiative so that every student in the building would have access to the internet from their own personal iPads.

== Academics ==
Students at Eagan High School receive a liberal arts education, rather than specializing in one area of study. Social studies and English are required each year, and students must choose from a sampling of physical education, fine arts, math, science, and foreign language classes before graduation. These core requirements leave ample room for electives and individual courses of study, and many students take advantage of Business, Technology Education, Family and Consumer Science, and other courses. Classes are organized into a trimester system and the school day is divided into seven periods.

=== Advanced coursework ===
A variety of options are offered for high-achieving students, including a decent number of Advanced Placement courses in the areas of art, literature, writing, history, math, and science. In 2014, over 950 Advanced Placement tests were administered, the highest in recent EHS history. Additionally, seniors may earn credit for Language and English at the University of Minnesota through its "College in the Schools" (CIS) program or take classes at local universities and colleges through the state-sponsored Post Secondary Enrollment Options (PSEO) program.

=== LINK program ===
To increase school spirit and soften the transition from middle school to high school, EHS began facilitating the Link Program in the 06–07 school year. At the end of the 05–06 school year, around 300 sophomores and juniors were nominated by staff to serve on the Link Crew the following year. About 110 were selected to be Link Crew Leaders and participated in several dozen hours of training in August 2006.

All incoming freshmen to EHS are assigned to a Link Leader, with approximately one dozen students per leader. The Link Crew Leaders are mentors and a source of assistance to freshmen. On the first day of school, freshmen participate with their leader in a welcoming program, consisting of various team-building activities.

As part of the Link Program, a new period was inserted into the schedule. Termed PAWS (People Achieving Wildcat Spirit), it is a 15-minute homeroom between the second and third periods of the day. Ideally composed of 5 students of each class (freshman, sophomore, junior, and senior), PAWS is a time for announcements to be read and forms handed out. Like Link, PAWS groups also engage in a variety of activities to promote school spirit and connectivity with other classes. PAWS groups are permanent throughout a student's high school career, with the same teacher and students for all four years.

=== Academic strength ===
The school has experienced success academically. The class of 2005 had an average SAT score of 1258 and an average ACT score of 23.8. A large portion of graduates—92% of the class of 2005—attend two or four year colleges and universities soon after graduation, with the vast majority pursuing four-year degrees. This academic success is also reflected in the school's consistently solid number of National Merit Scholars and Commended Scholars, as well as the number of academic awards it has earned.

The school has experienced occasional problems as well. Before Minnesota's star rating system for academic achievement was discontinued in 2006, Eagan High School was a one star school in reading and a four star school in math out of a possible five stars.

=== Special Education program ===
The school puts significant focus on its Special Education program which has caused the school's special education demographic to swell to 11%. In setting goals for future achievement through Minnesota's teacher incentive pay program, Eagan High School's sole goal was to increase standardized test scores for Special Education while other schools chose to focus on Advanced Placement programs. The Special Education program is very successful at sports as well, with many of the students contributing to the Dakota Hawks' annual success at softball and hockey.

== Extracurricular activities ==
The school has many extracurricular activities with over seventy percent of its faculty coaching or advising some sort of after-school program.

=== Forensics ===
Eagan High School has been most noted for its forensics programs. Through its speech and debate teams, it has won numerous awards including state and national titles in many categories. For the last decade, the National Speech and Debate Association has recognized EHS as one of the top 1% of schools in forensics nationwide. The NFL has also given its "School of Excellence" Award to Eagan every year since 1999 and named it one of the top five schools in the nation. In 2005, the school was given the Bruno E. Jacob National Team Award.

On April 21, 2007, the Eagan High School speech team set a new Class AA state record by claiming 20 medalists at the state tournament. Out of those 20 medalists, 4 were state champions.

In 2010, under the direction of coaches Joni Anker and Christopher McDonald, Eagan High School was the only school in the country to win all three trophies distributed at the NFL National Tournament: School of Excellence in Speech, School of Excellence in Debate, and School of Excellence in Speech and Debate.

In 2013, the EHS Speech team had three juniors make it to the final round in the NFL National Speech and Debate Tournament: Emerald Egwim took 3rd place in Dramatic Interpretation, Adam Strømme took 4th place in Extemporaneous Speaking, and Laurel Scott took 2nd place in Original Oratory.

The school also has a Student Congress team which competes within the state.

=== Athletics ===
Eagan High School currently offers twenty-seven interscholastic athletic activities and a variety of intramural sports programs, including adaptive soccer, floor hockey, and softball for special needs students.

The school competes under the Minnesota State High School League and is a member of the South Suburban Conference.

=== Music and drama ===
The school stages regular plays and musicals. The Music Department at Eagan High School enrolls nearly 700 students in one of its five curricular bands or six curricular choirs. They are instructed by five full-time teachers. The National Academy of Recording Arts and Sciences recognized Eagan for its vocal and instrumental music programs by naming it a GRAMMY Signature School in 2001. Through the school's history, more than 125 of its musicians have qualified for All-State Choir, Band, Jazz Band, and Orchestra. Its Wind Ensemble and Jazz Ensemble have both performed for the MN Music Educators Association mid-winter convention on multiple occasions.

EHS's theatre program has received multiple awards, such as a "Starred Performance" at One-Act State competition in 2014 for their production of The Diviners. Musicals are also recognized by the Spotlight program each year and have received Outstanding Production and Performance awards yearly since their first involvement in the program.

The EHS Winterguard won the 2004 Championships in the North Star Circuit in the category of Scholastic A, Division II under the direction of Erin Hager and Jessica Maher.

The EHS Winter Drumline has enjoyed tremendous success in marching percussion. The Eagan Drumline has won 14 state championships since its creation in 1993, always competing in the highest class of state scholastic competition. (1993, 1995, 1997–2006, 2010–2012)

In 2011 Eagan High School Jazz 1 received 1st place in the Eau Claire Jazz Festival.

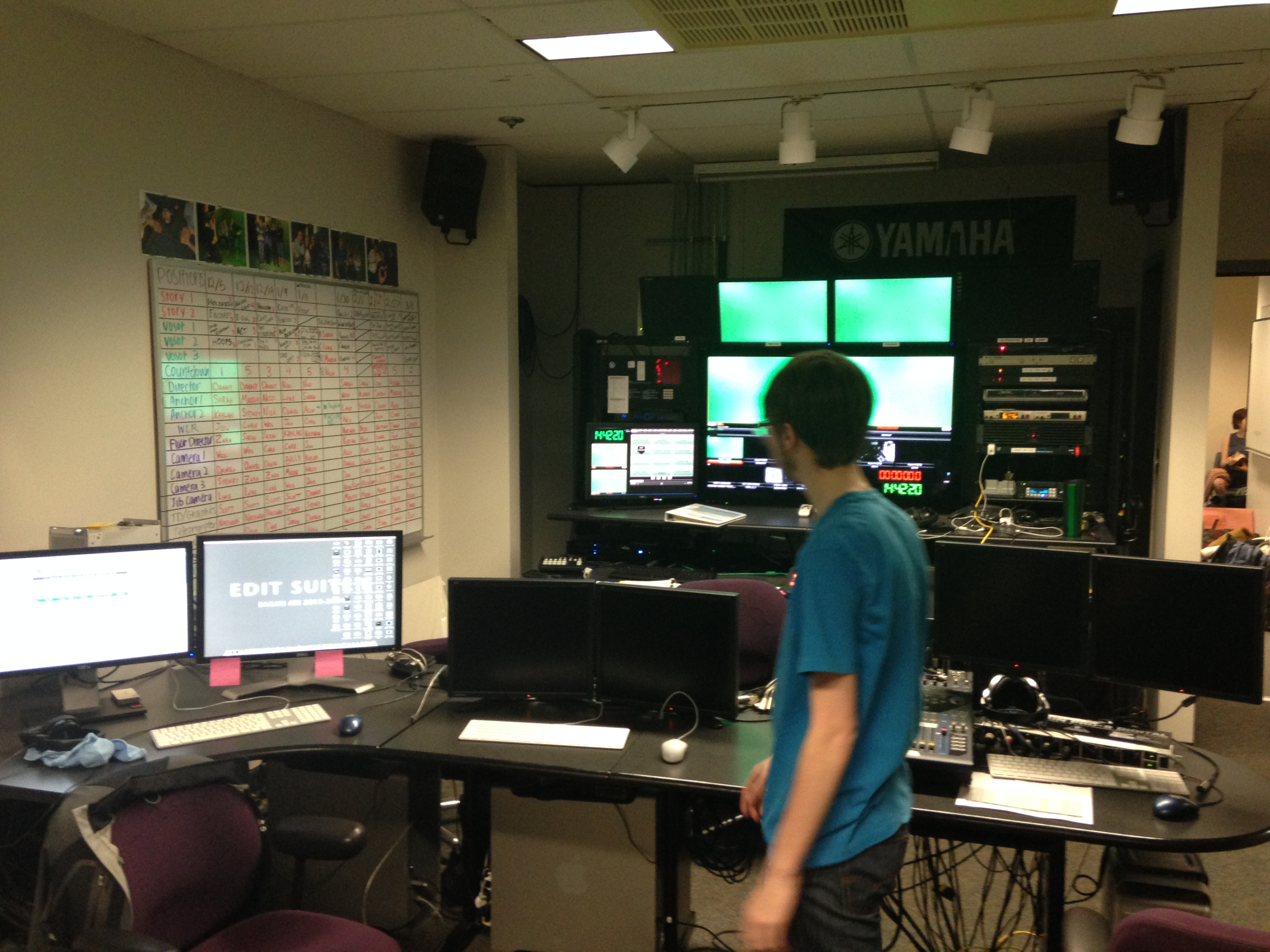
The student-run studio at Eagan High School where the school's live news program is produced.

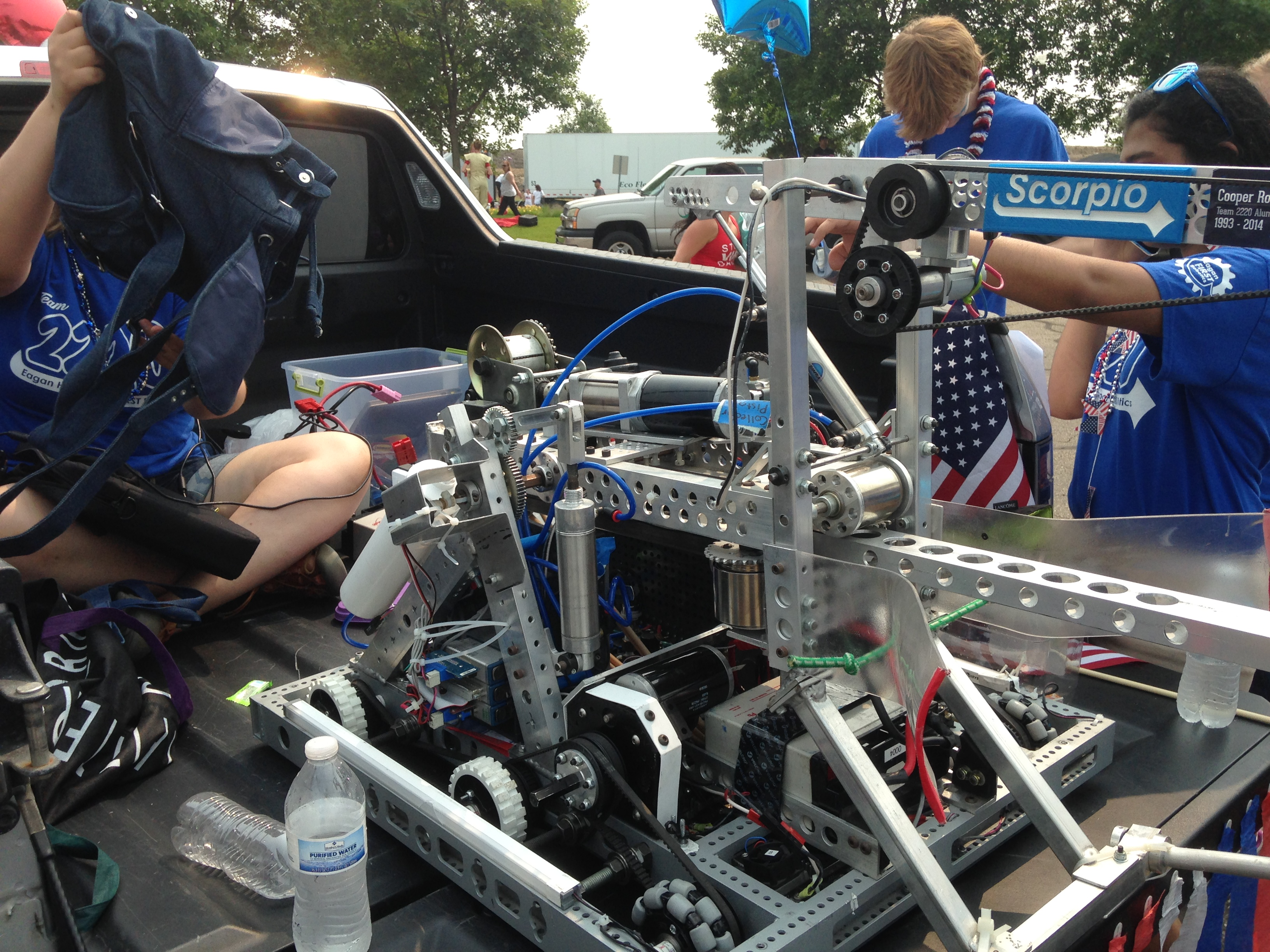
Team 2220 at Eagan's annual 4th of July parade with their robot from the 2014/2015 season.

=== Other activities ===
The school has a number of other activities, including:

- French, Spanish, and German clubs.
- Eagan Independent, EHS's monthly newspaper.
- Eagan AM, the school's student-run closed-circuit TV news program that airs every Wednesday.
- Mock Trial, a club where students present a law case in court, filling the roles of lawyers and witnesses.
- Science Olympiad, in which students compete in various competitions that involve the application of science.
- Math Team, where students compete in the Minnesota State High School Mathematics League.
- The school's FIRST Robotics team number is 2220, and their team name is Blue Twilight.

== Demographics ==
The racial and ethnic composition (as of the 2021–2022 school year) was as follows:

- White: 1,338
- Black: 189
- Hispanic/Latino: 247
- Asian: 223
- American Indian: 9
- Two or more races: 104

== Awards ==
- National Forensics League (NFL) School of Excellence, 1999–2013
- National Forensics League (NFL) Bruno E. Jacob Excellence Award for Speech-Debate Programs, 2005
- National Academy of Recording Arts and Sciences GRAMMY Signature High School, 2001
- National Blue Ribbon School of Excellence, 2001
- National Technology Exemplar School, 1996
- Redbook, Best of the State, 1996
- National Blue Ribbon School of Excellence, 1995
- McGraw-Hill 21st Century School of Technology, 1995

== Notable alumni ==
- John Bartholomew, International Master in chess
- Dan Bjornlie, professional hockey player
- Natalie Darwitz, women's hockey player, three-time Winter Olympic Games medalist
- Nicholas David, 3rd place in the 2012 season of The Voice
- Caroline Innerbichler, stage actress
- Maiysha, Grammy-nominated recording artist, Ford Agency Model
- Laura Osnes, Tony Award nominee, has starred on Broadway in Grease, Bonnie and Clyde, "Anything Goes", "South Pacific" and "Cinderella on Broadway"
- Tabitha Peterson, two-time women's Olympic curler, 2018 and 2022
- Tara Peterson, women's Olympic curler, 2022
- Mike Schneider, professional poker player, winner of PartyPoker.com Million V.
- Amy Thielen, chef, author, Food Network personality
- Joshua Evans Turner, known by his stage name Dem Atlas, rapper signed to Rhymesayers Entertainment
- Doug Wardlow, served as a Minnesota state representative from District 38B
- Mallory Weggemann, paralympic gold medalist swimmer and recipient of 2011 ESPY for "Best Female Athlete with a Disability"
- Zach Zenner, former running back in the NFL with the Detroit Lions, and played college football at South Dakota State University
